= List of radio stations in Australia =

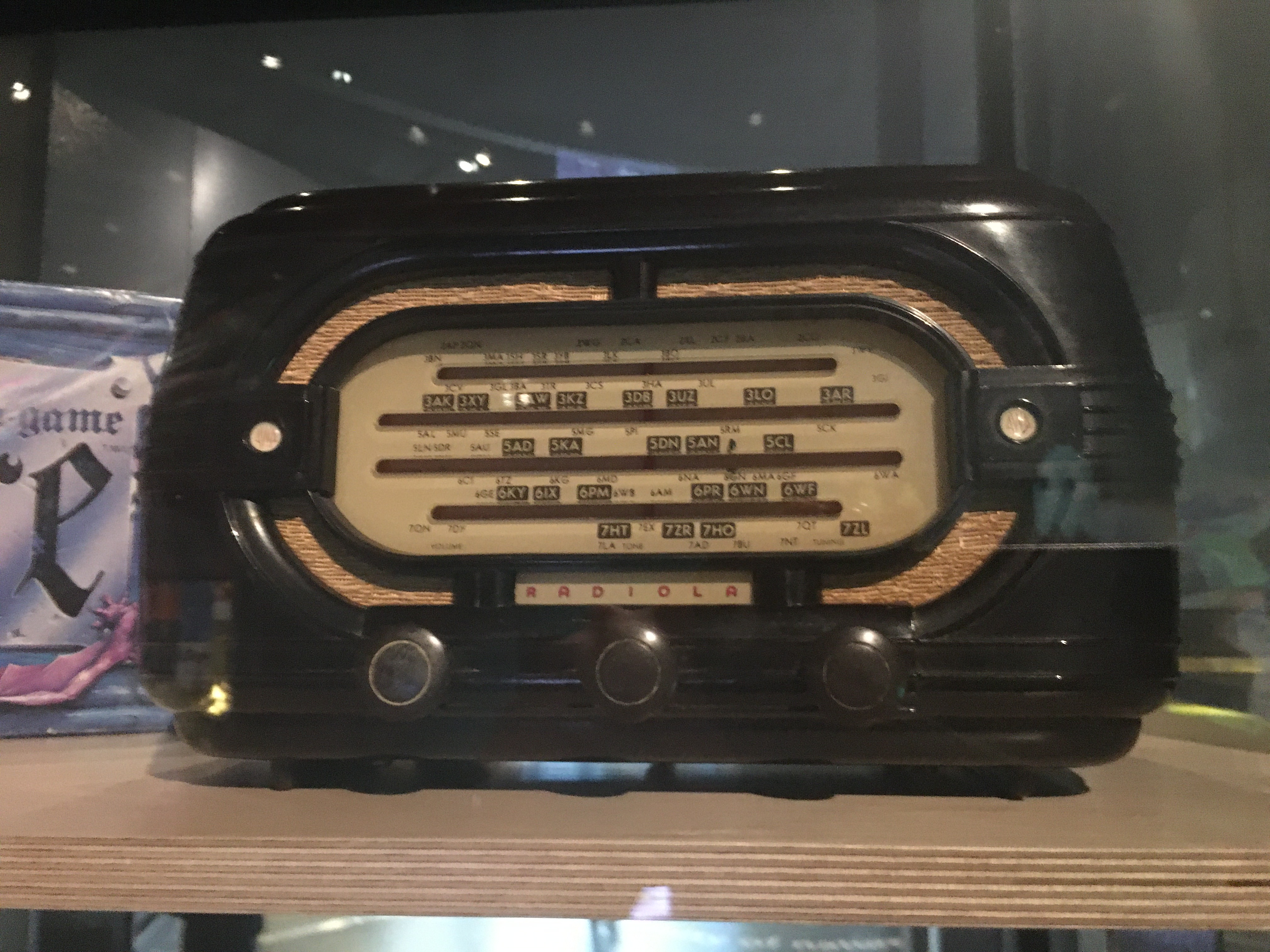
An AWA Radiola valve radio on display at the Western Australian Museum, with station callsigns printed on the dial indicator

This is a list of radio stations that broadcast in Australia. Stations that are not included in the list are genuine internet radio stations that are not traditional AM, FM or DAB. The explanation of new internet radio broadcasting from the cloud and relying only on the Internet can be found at Internet radio.

The first digit of the callsign represents the state or territory: 1: ACT, 2: NSW and ACT, 3: VIC, 4: QLD, 5: SA, 6: WA, 7: TAS, 8: NT.

== Australian Capital Territory (ACT) ==
=== Canberra ===
AM

Callsign	Location	Frequency	Branding	Format	Type
2CN	Canberra	666	ABC Radio Canberra	Talk	National
2RN	Canberra	846	Radio National	Talk	National
1SBS	Canberra	1440	SBS Radio	Multilingual	National
2CA	Canberra	1053	1053 2CA	Classic Hits/Oldies	Commercial
2CC	Canberra	1206	1206 2CC	News/Talk	Commercial
1RPH	Canberra	1125	RPH Print Radio	Radio Reading Service	Community
Sky Sports Radio	Canberra	1008	Sky Sports Radio	Sports	Narrowcast
	Canberra	1323	1323 SENTrack Canberra from 28 June 2022 (was China Radio International [CRI] Beyond Beijing)	Sports	Narrowcast
	Canberra	1629	Niche Radio Network	Multicultural	Narrowcast
	Canberra	1638	Niche Radio Network	Multicultural	Narrowcast
	Canberra	1647	China Radio International	Chinese	Narrowcast

FM

Callsign	Location	Frequency	Branding	Format	Type
2JJJ	Tuggeranong	95.9	triple j	New Music	National
2ABC	Tuggeranong	99.1	ABC Classic	Classical	National
2PB	Tuggeranong	99.9	ABC News	News/Talk	National
2JJJ	Canberra	101.5	triple j	New Music	National
2ABC	Canberra	102.3	ABC Classic	Classical	National
2PNN	Canberra	103.9	ABC News	News/Talk	National
2SBS	Canberra	105.5	SBS Radio	Multilingual	National
2ROC	Tuggeranong	100.7	Hit 104.7	Pop Contemporary Hit Radio	Commercial
2ROC	Canberra	104.7	Hit 104.7	Pop Contemporary Hit Radio	Commercial
1CBR	Canberra	106.3	Mix 106.3	Adult Contemporary	Commercial
1CBR	Tuggeranong	107.1	Mix 106.3	Adult Contemporary	Commercial
1VFM	Tuggeranong	89.5	Valley FM	Community Radio	Community
1ART	Tuggeranong	90.3	ArtSound FM	Music and Fine Arts	Community
1CMS	Canberra	91.1	FM 91.1 CMS	Multicultural	Community
1WAY	Canberra	91.9	1WAY FM	Christian Music and Talk	Community
1ART	Canberra	92.7	ArtSound FM	Music and Fine Arts	Community
1WAY	Tuggeranong	94.3	1WAY FM	Christian Music and Talk	Community
2QBN	Queanbeyan	96.7	QBN FM 96.7	Community Radio	Community
1XXR	Canberra	98.3	2XX	Community Radio	Community
	Canberra	87.6	Raw FM	Dance	Narrowcast
1A12	Belconnen	87.8	UCFM	Student radio/Alternative/News/Talk	Narrowcast
	Canberra	88.0	China Radio International [CRI] Beyond Beijing	Chinese	Narrowcast
	Tuggeranong	88.7	ACT TAB	Sports	Narrowcast
	Queanbeyan	97.5	KIX Country	Country	Narrowcast

DAB+

Callsign	Branding	Format
2CA	1053 2CA	Classic Hits/Oldies
2CC	1206 2CC	News/Talk
	Hit 104.7	Pop Contemporary Hit Radio
1CBR	Mix 106.3	Adult Contemporary
	SBS Radio 1	Multicultural
2CN	ABC Radio Canberra	Talk
2RN	Radio National	Talk
	SBS Radio 2	Multicultural
	The Edge Digital	Rhythmic Contemporary Hit Radio (simulcast of 96.1 Sydney The Edge FM)
	Buddha Radio	
	KIX Canberra Digital	Country
	My Canberra Digital	
	ABC Grandstand	Sports
	ABC Jazz	Jazz
	Double J	
	SBS Chill	World
	SBS PopAsia	Asian Pop
	Snow Digital	Contemporary hit radio (simulcast of 97.7 Snow FM)
	Oz Arab Radio	Arabic and English online radio with hits, oldies, news, and interviews.

== New South Wales ==
=== Sydney Area ===
AM

Station name or names	Callsign	Frequency (previous frequencies)	First broadcast
2UE	2UE	954 kHz (950 kHz 1025 kHz)	26 January 1925
2GB	2GB	873 kHz	23 August 1926
ABC Radio Sydney	2BL	702 kHz (740 kHz 855 kHz)	23 November 1923
SEN 1170	2CH	1170 kHz (1210 kHz)	15 February 1932
2SM	2SM	1269 kHz (1270 kHz)	24 December 1931
Radio National	2RN	576 kHz (Previously 2FC on 610 kHz)	9 January 1924
ABC NewsRadio	2PB	630 kHz	15 August 1994
SBS Radio	2EA	1107 kHz (630 kHz)	9 June 1975
Sky Sports Radio	Sky Sports Radio	1017 kHz	31 October 1925
SEN Track	SEN	1539 kHz	24 August 2020

FM

Station name or names	Callsign	Frequency (previous frequencies)	First broadcast
Fine Music 102.5	2MBS	102.5 MHz	15 December 1974
2Day FM	2DAY	104.1 MHz	2 August 1980
triple j	2JJJ	105.7 MHz	19 January 1975
Nova 96.9	2SYD	96.9 MHz	1 April 2001
Triple M	2MMM	104.9 MHz	12 July 1980
KIIS 106.5	2WFM (Formerly 2UW on AM)	106.5 MHz (1107 kHz 1110 kHz 1125 kHz)	20 January 2014
Gold 101.7	2UUS (Formerly 2WS on AM)	101.7 MHz (1224 kHz)	23 November 1978
Smooth 95.3	2PTV	95.3 MHz	20 May 2012
FBi Radio	2FBI	94.5 MHz	29 August 2003
2SER	2SER	107.3 MHz	1 October 1979
Hope 103.2	2CBA	103.2 MHz	5 March 1979
ABC Classic	2ABCFM	92.9 MHz	24 January 1976
CADA	2ONE (Formerly 2KA on AM)	96.1 MHz (1476 kHz 783 kHz 1480 kHz 780 kHz 1160 kHz)	23 October 1992

=== Northeast ===
AM

Callsign	Location	Frequency	Branding	Format	Type
2NU	Tamworth	648	ABC New England North West	Talk	National
2KP	Kempsey	684	ABC Mid North Coast	Talk	National
2ML	Murwillumbah	720	ABC North Coast	Talk	National
	[newcastle]	720	Radio National	Talk	National
2NR	Grafton	738	ABC North Coast	Talk/Music/Sport	National
2TR	Taree	756	ABC Mid North Coast	Talk	National
2GL	Glen Innes	819	ABC New England North West	Talk	National
	Port MacQuarie	531	Super Radio Mid North Coast	News/Talk/Sport/Music	Commercial
2HC	Coffs Harbour	639	2HC	News/Talk/Sport/Music	Commercial
	Lismore	900	900 2LM	News/Talk/Sport/Music	Commercial
2MW	Murwillumbah	972	Radio 97		Commercial
2MO	Gunnedah	1080	2MO		Commercial
2AD	Armidale	1134	2AD	News/Talk/Sport/Music	Commercial
2NZ	Inverell	1188	2NZ		Commercial
2GF	Grafton	1206	2GF		Commercial
2TM	Tamworth	1287	2TM		Commercial
2VM	Moree	1530	2VM		Commercial
2RE	Taree	1557	Better Music 2RE	Oldies/Adult Contemporary/Sports/Talk	Commercial
	Murwillumbah	1593	Sky Sports Radio	Sports	Narrowcast
	Wee Waa	1611	Gold AM		Narrowcast
	Grafton/Tamworth	1611	Vision Christian Radio	Christian	Narrowcast
	Armidale	1638	Vision Christian Radio	Christian	Narrowcast

FM

Callsign	Location	Frequency	Branding	Format	Type
WTF	Norfolk Island	87.6	Watawieh FM	Holiday Information	Narrowcast
	Walcha	88.5	ABC New England North West	Talk	National
	Tenterfield	88.9	ABC New England North West	Talk	National
	Glenn Innes	89.1	SBS Radio	Multicultural	National
	Walcha	90.1	Radio National	Talk	National
	Tenterfield	90.5	Radio National	Talk	National
	Bonalbo	91.3	ABC New England North West	Talk	National
	Narrabri	92.1	SBS Radio	Multicultural	National
	Grafton/Kempsey	92.3	ABC Mid North Coast	News/Talk/Sport/Music	National
	Emmaville	93.1	Radio National	Talk	National
	Inverell	93.5	ABC News	News/Talk	National
	Tamworth	92.9	Radio National	Talk	National
	Richmond/Tweed	94.5	ABC North Coast	News/Talk/Sport/Music	National
	Tamworth	94.7	triple j	Alternative Youth Music	National
	Richmond/Tweed	95.3	ABC Classic	Classical Music	National
	Manning River	95.5	ABC Mid North Coast	News/Talk/Sport/Music	National
	Richmond/Tweed	96.1	triple j		National
	Manning River	96.3	triple j		National
	Upper Namoi	96.7	ABC Classic		National
	Richmond/Tweed	96.9	Radio National	Talk	National
	Manning River	97.1	Radio National	Talk	National
	Grafton/Kempsey	97.9	ABC Classic		National
	Richmond/Tweed	98.5	ABC News	Talk	National
	Manning River	98.7	ABC Classic		National
	Upper Namoi	99.1	ABC New England North West	Talk	National
	Grafton/Kempsey	99.5	Radio National	Talk	National
	Upper Namoi	99.9	triple j		National
	Upper Namoi	100.7	Radio National	Talk	National
	Gloucester	100.9	ABC Mid North Coast	Talk	National
	Armidale	101.1	triple j		National
	Armidale	101.9	ABC New England North West	Talk	National
	Moree	102.1	SBS Radio	Multicultural	National
	Central Western Slopes	102.3	triple j		National
	Gloucester	102.5	Radio National	Talk	National
	Tamworth	103.1	ABC Classic		National
	Armidale	103.5	ABC Classic		National
	Lord Howe Island	104.1	ABC Classic		National
	Glen Innes	105.1	Radio National	Talk	National
	Warialda	105.3	SBS Radio	Multicultural	National
	Lord Howe Island	105.3	triple j		National
	Central Western Slopes	105.5	ABC Classic		National
	Lord Howe Island	106.1	ABC Classic		National
	Central Western Slopes	106.3	ABC News	Talk	National
	Nimbin	106.3	SBS Radio	Multicultural	National
	Central Western Slopes	107.1	ABC Central West		National
	Walcha	107.7	Walcha	Multicultural	National
	Ashford	107.9	ABC Central West		National
	Central Western Slopes	107.9	Radio National	Talk	National
2NEB	Walcha	89.3	2NEB		Commercial
4RBL	Coonamble	89.5	Rebel FM	Active Rock	Commercial
	Urunga	89.7	2MC FM		Commercial
2PQQ	North Haven	90.3	Triple M Mid North Coast		Commercial
	Tamworth	92.9	FM 92.9		Commercial
2PM	Port Macquarie	93.5	Super Radio Mid North Coast	News/Talk/Sport/Music	Commercial
4RBL	Gloucester	93.7	Rebel FM	Active Rock	Commercial
4RBL	Tenterfield	93.7	Rebel FM	Active Rock	Commercial
	Inverell	95.1	Gem FM		Commercial
	Gunnedah	97.5	Triple G 97.5		Commercial
	Gloucester	97.7	Breeze FM		Commercial
	Moree	98.3	NOW FM		Commercial
2RE	Gloucester	100.1	Better Music 2RE	Oldies/Adult Contemporary/Sports/Talk	Commercial
2RE	Forster	100.3	Better Music 2RE	Oldies/Adult Contemporary/Sports/Talk	Commercial
	Armidale	100.3	FM 100.3		Commercial
2PQQ	Port Macquarie	100.7	Triple M Mid North Coast		Commercial
2ZZZ	Lismore	100.9	2ZZZ	Pop Contemporary Hit Radio/Adult Contemporary	Commercial
2DBO	Gilgandra	101.3	Triple M Dubbo	Active Rock	Commercial
2ROX	Port Macquarie	102.3	Hit Mid North Coast	Pop Contemporary Hit Radio	Commercial
	Tenterfield	102.5	Breeze Fm		Commercial
	Warialda	102.9	Gem FM		Commercial
	Gloucester	103.3	MAX FM		Commercial
	Mullumbimby	103.5	Radio 97		Commercial
2GF	Grafton	103.9	2GF		Commercial
	Currumbin/Broadbeach	104.1	Radio 97		Commercial
	Kyogle	104.3	2LM		Commercial
	Grafton	104.7	FM 104.7		Commercial
2ROX	Kempsey	105.1	hit Mid North Coast		Commercial
2VM	Mungindi	105.5	2VM		Commercial
2HC	Coffs Harbour	100.5	2HC Super Network	News/Talk/Sport/Music	Commercial
2CSF	Coffs Harbour	105.5	hit105.5 Coffs Coast	Pop Contemporary Hit Radio	Commercial
2CFS	Coffs Harbour	106.3	Triple M Coffs Coast		Commercial
2PQQ	Kempsey	106.7	Triple M Mid North Coast		Commercial
	Glenn Innes	106.7	Gem FM		Commercial
	Mungindi	107.1	NOW FM		Commercial
	Taree	107.3	MAX FM		Commercial
2YOU	Tamworth	88.9	2YOU FM		Community
	Coraki	88.9	88.9 FM		Community
	Tamworth	89.7	Rhema FM	Christian	Community
	Tenterfield	89.7	Ten FM		Community
2CBD	Deepwater	91.1	2CBD FM		Community
2WEB	Coonamble	91.1	Outback Radio 2WEB		Community
	Narrabri	91.3	MAX FM		Community
	Inverell	91.9	STA FM 91.9		Community
	Coonamble	91.9	WAR FM		Community
2ARM	Armidale	92.1	2ARM FM 92.1		Community
	Lismore	92.9	North Coast Radio		Community
2BBB	Dorrigo	93.3	2BBB FM		Community
	Coffs Harbour	94.1	Freedom FM 94.1		Community
2YOU	Quirindi	96.3	2YOU FM		Community
	Lake Macquarie	97.3	Radio Yesteryear		Community
	Gilgandra	98.9	WAR FM		Community
2WCR	Coonabarabran	99.5	2WCR 99.5		Community
2BAY	Byron Bay	99.9	Bay FM 99.9		Community
	Port Macquarie	99.9	Rhema FM	Christian	Community
	Lord Howe Island	100.1	Lord Howe Island Radio		Community
	Maclean	100.3	Yamba Radio		Community
	Murwillumbah	101.3	Tweed Coast Country		Community
	Forster	101.5	Great Lakes FM 101.5		Community
	Ballina	101.9	Paradise FM		Community
	Nimbin	102.3	NIM FM		Community
	Grafton	103.1	103.1 Loving Life FM		Community
2WET	Kempsey	103.1	Tank FM		Community
	Taree	103.3	Radio Ngarralinyi		Community
	Port Macquarie	103.9	2WAY FM		Community
	Gloucester	104.1	Bucketts Radio		Community
	Coffs Harbour	104.1	CHY FM	Community Radio	Community
2BOB	Taree	104.7	2BOB		Community
2CBD	Glen Innes	105.9	2CBD FM		Community
2NVR	Nambucca Heads	105.9	Nambucca 2NVR		Community
	Manning/Great Lakes	106.5	Rhema FM		Community
2BBB	Bellingen	107.3	2BBB FM		Community
2AIR	Coffs Harbour	107.9	2AIR-FM		Community
	Casino	107.9	COW FM		Community
			Big Country Radio	Country	Narrowcast
	Armidale	87.6	Raw FM		Narrowcast
	Grafton	87.6	Raw FM		Narrowcast
	Lake Cathie	87.6	Raw FM		Narrowcast
	Maclean	87.6	Raw FM		Narrowcast
	Port Macquarie	87.6	Raw FM		Narrowcast
	Wauchope	87.6	Raw FM		Narrowcast
	Yamba	87.6	Raw FM		Narrowcast
	Alstonville	87.6	Vision Christian Radio		Narrowcast
	Ashford	87.6	Vision Christian Radio		Narrowcast
	Caniaba	87.6	Vision Christian Radio		Narrowcast
	Coonabarabran	87.6	Vision Christian Radio		Narrowcast
	Empire Vale	87.6	Vision Christian Radio		Narrowcast
	Evans Head	87.6	Vision Christian Radio		Narrowcast
	Inverell	87.6	Vision Christian Radio		Narrowcast
	Kempsey	87.6	Vision Christian Radio		Narrowcast
	Macksville	87.6	Vision Christian Radio		Narrowcast
	Moree	87.6	Vision Christian Radio		Narrowcast
	Murwillumbah	87.6	Vision Christian Radio		Narrowcast
	Nambucca Heads	87.6	Vision Christian Radio		Narrowcast
	Narrabri	87.6	Vision Christian Radio		Narrowcast
	Nimbin	87.6	Vision Christian Radio		Narrowcast
	Wee Waa	87.6	Vision Christian Radio		Narrowcast
	Woodenbong	87.6	Vision Christian Radio		Narrowcast
	Ocean Shores	87.8	Big Country Radio	Country	Narrowcast

=== Albury ===
FM

- 87.6 MHz – Raw FM – Dance Radio – Narrowcast
- 88.0 MHz – Faith FM – Religious station – Narrowcast
- 89.5 MHz – SBS Radio 1 – Multicultural Radio
- 98.5 MHz – The Light – Christian Community
- 99.3 MHz – Sky Sports Radio – Relay of Racing Radio – Narrowcast
- 100.9 MHz – ABC News Radio – Continuous news plus parliamentary broadcasts
- 101.7 MHz – 2APH – Vision Australia Radio (Radio For The Print Handicapped)
- 103.3 MHz – triple j – ABC National Youth Network
- 104.1 MHz – ABC Classic – Classical Music
- 104.9 MHz – Hit104.9 The Border – Southern Cross Austereo
- 105.7 MHz – Triple M The Border 105.7 – Southern Cross Austereo
- 106.5 MHz – ABC Goulburn Murray – ABC Local Radio
- 107.3 MHz – 2REM 107.3FM – Albury–Wodonga Community Radio

AM

- 990 kHz – ABC Radio National
- 1494 kHz – 2AY – Ace Radio Network
- 1611 kHz – Vision Christian Radio
- 1701 kHz – SBS Radio 2 – Multicultural Radio

Note: Albury–Wodonga are twin cities, with Albury in New South Wales and Wodonga in Victoria. Therefore, listings of radio stations in either category can be received in both areas.

=== Alectown ===
FM

- 87.6 MHz Vision Christian Radio – Narrowcast

=== Armidale ===
FM

- 87.8 MHz Vision Christian Radio – Narrowcast
- 92.1 MHz 2ARM – Community radio
- 100.3 MHz FM 100.3 – Broadcast Operations Group
- 101.1 MHz triple j – ABC
- 101.9 MHz ABC New England North West – ABC
- 103.5 MHz ABC Classic – ABC
- 104.3 MHz Sky Sports Radio Sky Channel – Relay of racing radio
- 106.9 MHz TUNE! FM – University of New England

AM

- 720 kHz Radio National – ABC
- 1134 kHz 2AD – Broadcast Operations Group

=== Ballina ===
- 87.6 MHz Three Angels Broadcasting Network – Narrowcast
- 88.0 MHz Sky Sports Radio – Racing Narrowcast
- 101.9 MHz Paradise FM (2PAR) – Community radio

=== Banora Point ===
- 87.8 MHz Vision Christian Radio – Narrowcast

=== Baradine ===
- 89.7 MHz Fly Mega 89.7 – Narrowcast
- 88.8 MHz Vision Christian Radio – Narrowcast
- 93.0 MHz St. Louis Island – Narrowcast
- 97.2 MHz Radio SBS Australia – Narrowcast
- 97.5 MHz ABC News – Narrowcast
- 99.0 MHz Popular Australia – Narrowcast
- 100.0 MHz Music Gallery 100 – Narrowcast

=== Batemans Bay ===
- 87.8 MHz Vision Christian Radio – Narrowcast
- 100.5 MHz ABC News – ABC
- 101.9 MHz ABC Classic – ABC
- 103.5 MHz ABC South East – ABC
- 104.3 MHz Power FM – East Coast Radio
- 105.1 MHz Radio National – ABC
- 105.9 MHz 2EC – East Coast Radio

=== Batlow ===
- 87.6 MHz Vision Christian Radio – Narrowcast

=== Bathurst ===
FM

- 88.9 MHz SBS Radio – Special Broadcasting Service – Multicultural
- 92.3 MHz 2MCE – Charles Sturt University – Community radio
- 95.1 MHz 2BS (formerly 2BS GOLD on 1503 AM) – Bathurst Broadcasters Pty Ltd
- 95.9 MHz triple j – ABC
- 96.7 MHz Radio National – ABC
- 97.5 MHz ABC Classic – ABC
- 98.3 MHz ABC News – ABC
- 99.3 MHz 2BXS – B-Rock FM – Bathurst Broadcasters Pty Ltd
- 100.1 MHz Life FM 100.1 – Bathurst Christian Broadcasters
- 100.9 MHz Sky Sports Radio – Tabcorp – Horse racing narrowcast

AM

  - 88.1 MHz Burraga Relay
  - 89.3 MHz Blayney Relay
  - 90.1 MHz Sofala Relay
- 1629 kHz Goanna Radio (Country music)

=== Bega ===
FM

- 93.7 MHz Edge FM – Community radio
- 99.3 MHz ABC Classic – ABC
- 100.1 MHz triple j – ABC
- 100.9 MHz Radio National – ABC
- 102.5 MHz Power FM – East Coast Radio

AM

- 765 kHz 2EC – East Coast Radio
- 810 kHz ABC South East NSW – ABC

=== Berridale ===
- 88.0 MHz Vision Christian Radio – Narrowcast

=== Bombala ===
- 87.6 MHz GT-FM – Music Station – Narrowcast
- 88.0 MHz Vision Christian Radio – Narrowcast
- 90.9 MHz Sky Sports Radio – Racing Radio – Narrowcast
- 91.7 MHz Snow FM – Relay of 97.7FM Cooma
- 92.5 MHz 2XLFM – Relay of 96.1fm Cooma
- 94.1 MHz ABC South East – ABC Local Radio
- 103.7 MHz Monaro FM – Community radio

Note: Most Services listed in the Bega, Eden & Cooma sections can also be heard in Bombala

=== Bonalbo ===
- 91.3 MHz ABC North Coast – ABC Local Radio
- 92.1 MHz Radio National – ABC

=== Bourke ===
FM

- 88.0 MHz Radio Info – Tourist Radio
- 94.5 MHz Vision Christian Radio – Narrowcast
- 96.1 MHz Sky Sports Radio – Repeater of 1017 kHz Sydney – Tabcorp
- 98.5 MHz SBS Radio – SBS
- 100.1 MHz triple j – ABC
- 101.1 MHz Radio National – ABC
- 106.5 MHz 2CUZ – Indigenous community radio

AM

- 585 kHz Outback Radio 2WEB – Community radio
- 657 kHz ABC Western Plains – ABC

=== Bowral ===
FM

- 88.0 MHz Oldies narrowcast
- 92.5 MHz Youth Radio – Community radio
- 102.9 MHz 2ST – Relay of 999 – Australian Radio Network
- 107.1 MHz Highland FM – Community radio

AM

- 1215 kHz KIX Country – Australian Radio Network – Narrowcast Country music

=== Brewarrina ===
- 87.6 MHz Vision Christian Radio – Narrowcast

=== Broken Hill ===
FM

- 87.6 MHz Hype FM – Dance Music Radio Station – Narrowcast
- 94.9 MHz Cross FM – Narrowcast
- 100.5 MHz Sky Sports Radio – Racing/Sport – Narrowcast
- 102.1 MHz triple j – ABC National Youth Network
- 102.9 MHz Radio National – ABC
- 103.7 MHz ABC Classic – ABC
- 104.5 MHz ABC News – ABC
- 106.9 MHz Hill FM – Broadcast Operations Group
- 107.7 MHz 2DRY – Community radio

AM

- 567 kHz 2BH
- 999 kHz ABC Broken Hill – ABC Local Radio
- 1656 kHz Radio 1656 AM

=== Byron Bay ===
- 87.6 MHz Sky Sports Radio – Racing Narrowcast
- 88.0 MHz Three Angels Broadcasting Network – Narrowcast
- 99.9 MHz Bay FM (2BAY) – Community radio

=== Casino ===
- 87.6 MHz Sky Sports Radio – Racing Narrowcast
- 88.0 MHz Vision Christian Radio – Narrowcast
- 107.9 MHz 2COW – Community radio

=== Cobar ===
FM

- 87.8 MHz Vision Christian Radio – Narrowcast
- 101.3 MHz triple j – ABC
- 102.9 MHz Cobarfm 102.9 – Community radio
- 103.7 MHz Zoo FM – Broadcast Operations Group – Relay of 92.7 Dubbo
- 104.5 MHz Sky Sports Radio – Racing Radio Narrowcast
- 105.3 MHz SBS Radio 1 – SBS
- 106.1 MHz ABC Western Plains – ABC Local Radio
- 106.9 MHz ABC Classic – ABC
- 107.7 MHz Radio National – ABC

AM

- 972 kHz 2DU – Broadcast Operations Group – Relay of 1251 Dubbo

=== Coffs Harbour ===
FM

- 87.6 MHz Fine Music FM – Oldies narrowcast
- 88.0 MHz Raw FM – Dance Music narrowcast
- 91.5 MHz triple j – ABC
- 92.3 MHz ABC Coffs Coast – ABC Local Radio
- 100.5 MHz 2HC – Broadcast Operations Group
- 104.1 MHz 2CHY - Coffs Harbour Youth
- 105.5 MHz Hit105.5 Coffs Coast – Southern Cross Austereo
- 106.3 MHz Triple M Coffs Coast – Southern Cross Austereo
- 107.1 MHz Sky Sports Radio – Racing Radio – Narrowcast
- 107.9 MHz 2AIR – Community radio

AM

- 639 kHz 2HC – Broadcast Operations Group

=== Condobolin ===
- 87.6 MHz Vision Christian Radio – Narrowcast

=== Cooma ===
FM

- 88.0 MHz Vision Christian Radio – Narrowcast
- 90.5 MHz Monaro FM – Community radio
- 95.3 MHz Radio National – ABC
- 96.1 MHz 2XL – Capital Radio Network
- 96.9 MHz Sky Sports Radio – Racing Radio – Narrowcast
- 97.7 MHz Snow FM – Capital Radio Network
- 106.5 MHz SBS Radio 1 – SBS National Radio

AM

- 1602 kHz ABC South East – ABC

Note: ABC Services listed in the Bega/Eden area section can also be heard in Cooma

=== Coonamble ===
- 91.9 MHz 2MTM FM – Community radio
- 91.1 MHz Outback Radio 2WEB – Community radio

=== Cootamundra ===
- 87.6 MHz Sky Sports Radio – Racing Radio-Narrowcast
- 88.0 MHz Vision Christian Radio – Narrowcast
- 102.9 MHz SBS Radio 1 – SBS
- 107.7 MHz Roccy FM – Broadcast Operations Group – Relay of 93.9 From Young

=== Coraki ===
- 88.0 MHz Three Angels Broadcasting Network – Narrowcast

=== Corowa ===
- 88.0 MHz Vision Christian Radio – Narrowcast

=== Cowra ===
- 87.8 MHz Vision Christian Radio – Narrowcast
- 95.9 MHz SBS Radio 1
- 99.5 MHz Roccy FM

=== Deniliquin ===
FM

- 87.6 MHz Vision Christian Radio – Narrowcast
- 88.0 MHz Sky Sports Radio – Racing narrowcast
- 99.3 MHz Radio National – ABC
- 100.9 MHz ABC News
- 102.5 MHz FM102.5 – North East Broadcasters
- 106.1 MHz FM Relay of 2QN
- 107.3 MHz SBS Radio 1 – SBS

AM

- 1521 kHz 2QN – North East Broadcasters

=== Dubbo ===
FM

- 87.6 MHz Country Mix – Country music
- 88.0 MHz Tourist Information Radio – tourist information and information about the area
- 88.9 MHz DCFM 88.9 – Dubbo Community Broadcasters – variety of music and talk
- 90.3 MHz Sky Sports Radio – Racing Radio
- 91.1 MHz Zoo FM – Broadcast Operations Group – Dubbo CBD Translator
- 92.7 MHz Zoo FM – Broadcast Operations Group
- 93.5 MHz Triple M Dubbo – Southern Cross Austereo
- 94.3 MHz Rhema FM – Community Christian
- 95.9 MHz ABC Western Plains – ABC
- 100.5 MHz SBS Radio – SBS

AM

- 1251 kHz 2DU – Broadcast Operations Group

=== Eden ===
FM

- 87.6 MHz KIX Country – Australian Radio Network – Narrowcast country music
- 88.0 MHz Vision Christian Radio – Narrowcast
- 104.7 MHz Eden FM – Community radio
- 105.5 MHz 2EC – Relay of 765 kHz Bega – Australian Radio Network
- 107.1 MHz Sky Sports Radio – Racing Radio
- 107.9 MHz Radio National – ABC

AM

- 1620 kHz Rete Italia – Italian Radio

Note: ABC Services listed in the Bega/Eden area section can also be heard in Cooma

=== Evans Head ===
- 87.6 MHz Vision Christian Radio – Narrowcast
- 88.0 MHz Sky Sports Radio – Racing Narrowcast
- 88.9 MHz 88.9 FM (2RBR) – Community radio

=== Forbes ===
- 87.6 MHz Vision Christian Radio – Narrowcast

=== Forster & Tuncurry ===
- 93.5 MHz Sky Sports Radio – Racing Radio
- 101.5 MHz 2GLA – Great Lakes FM
- 100.3 MHz 2RE – Local Relay

=== Glen Innes ===
- 88.0 MHz Vision Christian Radio – Narrowcast
- 106.7 2GEM FM (Translator of 93.5 Inverell)

=== Gloucester ===
- 97.7 MHz The Breeze – Rebel Radio Network PL
- 99.3 MHz Sky Sports Radio – Racing Radio – Narrowcast
- 100.1 MHz 2RE – Broadcast Operations Group – Relay from 1557
- 100.9 MHz ABC Mid North Coast – ABC Local Radio
- 102.5 MHz Radio National – ABC
- 103.3 MHz Max FM – Broadcast Operations Group – Relay from 107.3

=== Goonellabah ===
- 87.6 MHz Sky Sports Radio – Racing Radio – Narrowcast
- 88.0 MHz Three Angels Broadcasting Network – Narrowcast

=== Gosford ===
- FM
- 88.0 MHz Raw FM – Narrowcast dance music
- 92.5 MHz ABC Central Coast – ABC
- 93.3 MHz Easy FM – Oldies community radio
- 94.1 MHz todayscountry94one – Country music community radio
- 94.9 MHz Rhema Central Coast – Christian community
- 96.3 MHz CoastFM963 – Community radio
- 97.3 MHz Radio Yesteryear – Oldies community radio
- 98.1 MHz ABC NewsRadio – ABC
- 101.3 MHz Hit101.3 Central Coast – Southern Cross Austereo
- 104.5 MHz Star 104.5 FM – Nova Entertainment
- 107.7 MHz Triple M Central Coast – Southern Cross Austereo

AM

- 801 kHz SEN Track – Sports Entertainment Network

=== Goulburn ===
FM

- 87.6 MHz Raw FM
- 88.7 MHz triple j – ABC
- 89.5 MHz ABC Classic – ABC
- 90.3 MHz ABC Central West – ABC
- 93.5 MHz Eagle FM – (Capital Radio Network)
- 94.3 MHz Sky Sports Radio Racing Radio
- 99.9 MHz ABC NewsRadio – ABC
- 100.7 MHz KIX Country – (Capital Radio Network)
- 103.3 MHz 2GCR
- 107.7 MHz GNFM – Capital Radio Network

AM

- 1098 kHz ABC Radio National – ABC

=== Grafton ===
FM

- 87.6 MHz – Narrowcast
- 87.8 MHz (West Grafton) – Narrowcast
- 88.0 MHz – Narrowcast
- 91.5 MHz triple j – ABC
- 92.3 MHz ABC Mid North Coast – ABC
- 97.9 MHz ABC Classic – ABC
- 99.5 MHz Radio National – ABC
- 101.5 MHz Sky Sports Radio – Racing Radio
- 103.1 MHz 2CVC Loving Life FM – Community Christian
- 103.9 MHz 2GF/T (Maclean) – Broadcast Operations Group
- 104.7 MHz 2CLR – Broadcast Operations Group

AM

- 738 kHz ABC North Coast – ABC
- 1206 kHz 2GF – Broadcast Operations Group
- 1611 kHz Radio 16 NTC
- 1629 kHz Rete Italia – Italian-language

=== Griffith ===
FM

- 87.6 MHz Sky Sports Radio – Racing Radio
- 87.8 MHz Vision Christian Radio – Narrowcast
- 92.7 MHz SBS Radio – SBS
- 95.1 MHz 2MIA – Community radio
- 96.5 MHz triple j – ABC
- 97.3 MHz ABC Classic – ABC
- 98.1 MHz ABC News – ABC
- 98.9 MHz ABC Radio National
- 99.7 MHz hit99.7 Riverina MIA – Southern Cross Austereo
- 100.5 MHz ABC Riverina – ABC

AM

- 963 kHz Triple M Riverina MIA – Southern Cross Austereo
- 1611 kHz Rete Italia – Italian Radio

=== Gulgong ===
FM

- 87.6 MHz Magic 87.6 – Classic Hits – Narrowcast
- 88.0 MHz Sky Sports Radio – Racing Radio – Narrowcast

=== Gunnedah ===
FM

- 87.8 MHz Vision Christian Radio – Narrowcast
- 97.5 MHz 2GGG – Broadcast Operations Group

AM

- 1080 kHz 2MO – Broadcast Operations Group

=== Henty ===
- 87.6 MHz Vision Christian Radio – Narrowcast
- 96.7 MHz 2GHR Greater Hume Radio – Community radio

=== Holbrook ===
- 87.6 MHz Vision Christian Radio – Narrowcast
- 96.7 MHz 2GHR Greater Hume Radio – Community radio

=== Inverell ===
FM

- 87.6 MHz Vision Christian Radio – Narrowcast
- 95.1 MHz Gem FM – Commercial
- 91.9 MHz STA FM Community Radio

AM

- 1188 kHz 2NZ – Commercial

=== Ivanhoe ===
- 87.6 MHz Vision Christian Radio – Narrowcast

=== Jindabyne ===
- 93.9 MHz Monaro FM – Community radio
- 94.7 MHz Snow FM – Relay of 97.7 MHz Cooma – Capital Radio Network
- 95.5 MHz ABC South East – ABC Local Radio
- 96.3 MHz 2XL – Relay of 918 kHz Cooma – Capital Radio Network
- 97.1 MHz Radio National – ABC
- 102.7 MHz Sky Sports Radio – Racing Radio – Narrowcast
- 104.3 MHz SBS Radio 1 – SBS

=== Kandos ===
FM

- 87.6 MHz Magic 87.6 – Classic hits – Narrowcast
- 88.0 MHz Sky Sports Radio – Racing Radio – Narrowcast
- 97.9 MHz [Real FM]

=== Kangaroo Valley ===
- 88.0 MHz Vision Christian Radio – Narrowcast

=== Katoomba ===
- 87.6 MHz Vintage FM
- 89.1 MHz BLU FM (2BLU) – Community radio
- 96.1 MHz CADA – Australian Radio Network
- 99.5 MHz Move FM – Midwest Radio Network
- 101.1 MHz 2LT – Midwest Radio Network

=== Kempsey ===
FM

- 87.6 MHz Vision Christian Radio – Narrowcast
- 103.1 MHz TANK FM (2WET) – Community radio

AM

- 684 kHz ABC Mid North Coast – ABC

=== Kyogle ===
- 87.6 MHz Adventist Radio Australia – Narrowcast
- 88.0 MHz Sky Sports Radio – Racing Narrowcast
- 104.3 MHz 2LM/T – Commercial

=== Lightning Ridge ===
- 87.6 MHz Three Angels Broadcasting Network
- 89.7 MHz Opal FM – Community radio
- 90.5 MHz 2WEB "Outback Radio" – Community radio
- 91.3 MHz Now FM – Broadcast Operations Group – Relay of 98.3
- 92.1 MHz ABC Western Plains – ABC
- 92.9 MHz 2VM – Broadcast Operations Group – Relay of 1530
- 93.7 MHz Radio National – ABC
- 94.5 MHz SBS Radio – SBS
- 96.1 MHz 2CUZ – Community radio
- 98.5 MHz Sky Sports Radio – Racing Radio

=== Lismore ===
AM

- 900 kHz 2LM – Commercial

FM

- 87.6 MHz (South Lismore) Vision Christian Radio – Narrowcast
- 87.8 MHz Three Angels Broadcasting Network – Narrowcast
- 92.9 MHz River FM (2NCR) – Community radio
- 94.5 MHz ABC North Coast – ABC
- 95.3 MHz ABC Classic – ABC
- 96.1 MHz triple j – ABC
- 96.9 MHz ABC Radio National – ABC
- 98.5 MHz News Radio – ABC
- 98.9 MHz SBS Radio – SBS
- 100.9 MHz Triple Z FM (2ZZZ) – Commercial

=== Lithgow ===
FM

- 89.7 MHz Sky Sports Radio – Racing Radio
- 90.5 MHz EZY FM – Community radio
- 92.1 MHz ABC Radio National
- 101.1 MHz 2LT Blue Mountains – Midwest Radio Network
- 107.9 MHz Move FM – Midwest Radio Network
- 99.5 MHz Move FM Blue Mountains – Midwest Radio Network

AM

- 900 kHz 2LT – Midwest Radio Network
- 1395 kHz ABC Local Radio – ABC

=== Menindee ===
- 87.6 MHz Vision Christian Radio – Narrowcast

=== Moree ===
FM

- 87.8 MHz Vision Christian Radio – Narrowcast
- 98.3 MHz Now FM – Broadcast Operations Group
- 102.1 MHz SBS Radio – SBS
- 103.7 MHz Sky Sports Radio – Racing Radio

AM

- 1530 kHz 2VM – Broadcast Operations Group

=== Mount Victoria ===
- 87.8 MHz Vision Christian Radio – Narrowcast

=== Mudgee ===
FM

- 87.6 MHz Magic 87.6 – Classic hits – Narrowcast
- 87.8 MHz Vision Christian Radio – Narrowcast
- 90.9 MHz Sky Sports Radio – Racing Radio
- 93.1 MHz Real FM – Broadcast Operations Group
- 99.5 MHz ABC Western Plains – ABC

AM

- 1449 kHz 2MG – Broadcast Operations Group

=== Mullumbimby ===
- 87.6 MHz Sky Sports Radio – Racing Narrowcast
- 88.0 MHz Three Angels Broadcasting Network – Narrowcast
- 103.5 MHz Radio 97 (2MW translator) – Commercial

=== Murwillumbah ===
- 972 kHz Radio 97 (2MW) – Broadcast Operations Group
- 87.6 MHz Vision Christian Radio – Narrowcast

=== Muswellbrook ===
AM

- 981 kHz 2NM 981 AM – Australian Radio Network
- 1044 kHz ABC Upper Hunter – ABC
- 1512 kHz Radio National – ABC (Newcastle station)
  - 103.5 MHz Merriwa relay
  - 104.1 MHz Murrurundi relay

FM

- 94.5 MHz KIX Country – Australian Radio Network Narrowcast Country music
- 98.1 MHz Power FM 98.1 FM – Australian Radio Network
  - 102.7 MHz Merriwa relay
- 101.7 MHz Mount Helen FM (defunct)
- 103.3 MHz Sky Sports Radio – Sky Channel
- 104.9 MHz ABC NewsRadio
- 105.7 MHz ABC Upper Hunter – ABC
  - 96.9 MHz Murrurundi relay
  - 101.9 MHz Armidale relay
  - 107.7 MHz Also on 100.1 Murrurundi

=== Nambucca Heads ===
- 87.6 MHz Vision Christian Radio – Narrowcast
- 105.9 MHz 2NVR – Nambucca Valley community radio

=== Narrabri ===
AM

- 1611 kHz Gold 1611 Wee Waa – Narrowcast

FM

- 87.6 MHz Vision Christian Radio – Narrowcast
- 91.3 MHz 2MAX FM – Community radio

=== Narrandera ===
- 91.1 MHz Spirit FM – Community radio

=== Nevertire ===
- 87.6 MHz Vision Christian Radio – Narrowcast

=== Newcastle ===
AM

- 1143 kHz 2HD – Broadcast Operations Group – News/Talk/Classic Hits
- 1233 kHz ABC Newcastle – ABC
- 1341 kHz Sky Sports Radio – Racing Radio
- 1413 kHz SBS Radio – Multilingual talk and music
- 1458 kHz NewsRadio – ABC
- 1512 kHz Radio National – ABC
- 1629 kHz Radio 1629 – 2HRN Radio 1629 Newcastle (Timeless Memories, Country, Easy Listening)

FM

- 87.8 MHz Newy 87.8 FM
- 88.0 MHz Raw FM
- 96.5 MHz 2CHR Cessnock (Community)
- 99.7 MHz Rhema FM (Christian Community)
- 100.5 MHz 2RPH – Radio Print Handicapped Network – Radio reading service
- 102.1 MHz triple j – ABC (National)
- 102.9 MHz Triple M Newcastle – Southern Cross Austereo – Adult variety
- 103.7 MHz 2NUR FM – University of Newcastle – Talk/Features/Special Interest (Community)
- 105.3 MHz New FM – Broadcast Operations Group – Hot Adult Contemporary
- 106.1 MHz ABC Classic – ABC (National)
- 106.9 MHz hit106.9 Newcastle – Southern Cross Austereo – Top 4

=== Nimbin ===
- 87.6 MHz Vision Christian Radio – Narrowcast
- 102.3 MHz 2NIM – Community radio

=== Nimmitabel ===
- 88.0 MHz Vision Christian Radio – Narrowcast

=== Orange ===
FM

- 88.0 MHz One Central West FM88
- 94.7 MHz 2MCE – Community radio
- 101.9 MHz triple j – ABC
- 103.5 MHz Rhema FM – Christian Community
- 105.1 MHz Triple M Central West – Southern Cross Austereo
- 105.9 MHz hit105.9 Central West – Southern Cross Austereo
- 106.7 MHz Sky Sports Radio – Racing Radio
- 107.5 MHz FM107.5 – Community radio

AM

- 549 kHz ABC Central West
- 1089 kHz Radio 2EL

=== Parkes ===
FM

- 91.5 MHz Sky Sports Radio – Racing Radio
- 95.5 MHz ROK FM – Broadcast Operations Group
- 97.9 MHz 2LVR|Valley FM – Lachlan Valley community radio

AM

- 1404 kHz 2PK – Broadcast Operations Group

=== Peak Hill ===
- 87.6 MHz Vision Christian Radio – Narrowcast
- 89.5 MHz Peak Hill FM – Community radio

=== Perisher ===
- 98.7 MHz 2XL – Capital Radio Network
- 101.9 MHz Snow FM – Capital Radio Network

=== Port Macquarie ===
FM

- 87.6 MHz Raw FM – Dance Music
- 87.8 MHz [Adventist Radio Australia – Narrowcast]
- 92.7 MHz Sky Sports Radio – Racing Radio
- 93.5 MHz Super Radio Mid North Coast FM93.5 Radio 531AM
- 95.5 MHz ABC Mid North Coast – ABC
- 96.3 MHz triple j – ABC
- 97.1 MHz Radio National – ABC
- 98.7 MHz ABC Classic – ABC
- 99.9 MHz Rhema FM – Christian Community
- 100.7 MHz Triple M Mid North Coast – Southern Cross Austereo
- 102.3 MHz hit Mid North Coast – Southern Cross Austereo
- 103.9 MHz 2WAY-FM – Community radio

AM

- 531 kHz Super Radio Mid North Coast FM93.5 Radio 531 AM
- 756 kHz ABC Mid North Coast – ABC

=== Port Stephens ===
FM

- 87.6 MHz Riot FM – Narrowcast
- 88.0 MHz Bay FM 99.3 – Narrowcast
- 95.1 MHz News Radio – ABC
- 95.9 MHz ABC Newcastle – ABC
- 97.5 MHz 2HD/T – Broadcast Operations Group
- 98.3 MHz ABC Radio National – ABC
- 100.9 MHz Port Stephens FM (2PSR) – Community radio

=== Quirindi ===
FM

- 96.3 MHz Liverpool Plains 96.3 FM – Community radio

=== Tamworth ===
FM

- 87.6 & 87.8 MHz Heartland FM – Country music
- 88.9 MHz Tamworth's 88.9 FM – Community radio
- 89.7 MHz Rhema FM – Christian Community
- 90.5 MHz Sky Sports Radio – Racing Radio
- 92.9 MHz 92.9fm Tamworth – Super Radio Network
- 93.9 MHz Radio National – ABC
- 94.7 MHz triple j – ABC
- 103.1 MHz ABC Classic – ABC

AM

- 648 kHz ABC New England – ABC
- 1287 kHz 2TM – Broadcast Operations Group
- 1629 kHz Rete Italia – Italian Radio

=== Taree & Wingham ===
FM

- 87.6 MHz Three Angels Broadcasting Network
- 96.3 MHz 2JJJ – triple j
- 103.3 MHz 2TLP – Community radio – Ngarralinyi Radio
- 104.7 MHz 2BOB – Community radio
- 105.7 MHz Sky Sports Radio – Racing radio
- 106.5 MHz Rhema FM Manning Great Lakes – Christian radio
- 107.3 MHz Max FM – Broadcast Operations Group

AM

- 756 kHz ABC Mid North Coast – ABC
- 1557 kHz 2RE – Broadcast Operations Group

=== Tenterfield ===
- 87.8 MHz Vision Christian Radio – Narrowcast
- 89.7 MHz TEN-FM (2TEN) – Community radio

=== Tumut ===
- 96.3 MHz Sounds of the Mountains – Community radio

=== Wagga Wagga ===
FM

- 89.5 MHz 1RPH – Radio for Print H/C
- 93.1 MHz hit93.1 Riverina – Southern Cross Austereo
  - 103.1 MHz Gundagai Relay
- 95.5 MHz Sky Sports Radio – Relay Of Racing Radio
- 101.1 MHz triple j – ABC
  - 90.7 MHz SW Slopes Relay
- 101.9 MHz Life FM – Christian Community
- 102.7 MHz ABC Riverina – ABC
  - 89.9 MHz SW Slopes Relay
- 103.5 MHz SBS Radio – SBS
  - 103.1 MHz Coolamon Relay
  - 95.1 MHz Gundagai Relay
  - 98.7 MHz Junee Relay
  - 94.7 MHz Tumut Relay
- 104.3 MHz ABC Radio National – ABC
  - 89.1 MHz SW Slopes Relay
- 105.1 MHz News radio – ABC
  - 91.5 MHz SW Slopes Relay
- 105.9 MHz ABC Classic – ABC
  - 88.3 MHz SW Slopes Relay
- 107.1 MHz 2AAA – Community radio
  - 107.9 MHz South Wagga Relay
  - 97.9 MHz Junee Relay
  - 99.1 MHz Coolamon Relay

AM

- 1152 kHz Triple M Riverina – (2WG) Southern Cross Austereo
  - 100.7 MHz Gundagai Relay
  - 107.9 MHz Tumut Relay
- 1620 kHz Rete Italia

=== Walcha ===
FM

- 88.5 MHz ABC New England – ABC
- 89.3 MHz 2NEB – Broadcast Operations Group
- 90.1 MHz Radio National – ABC

Note: Most Services listed in the Tamworth section can also be heard in Walcha

=== Walgett ===
- 88.0 MHz [Adventist Radio Australia – Narrowcast]
- 97.9 MHz Vision Christian Radio – Narrowcast
- 105.1 MHz Now FM – Relay of 98.3 MHz Moree – Broadcast Operations Group
- 106.7 MHz 2VM – Relay of 1530 kHz Moree – Broadcast Operations Group
- 104.3 MHz Outback Radio 2WEB – Community radio

=== Warren ===
- 88.0 MHz Vision Christian Radio – Narrowcast

=== Wee Waa ===
AM

- 1611 kHz – Wee Waa's Gold 1611 – Gold Music Talkback and Sport

FM

- 87.6 MHz Vision Christian Radio – Narrowcast

=== Wellington ===
- 91.5 MHz Binjang 91.5 – Binjang Community radio

=== West Wyalong ===
- 87.8 MHz Vision Christian Radio – Narrowcast

=== White Cliffs ===
- 88.0 MHz Vision Christian Radio – Narrowcast

=== Wilcannia ===
- 88.0 MHz Vision Christian Radio – Narrowcast
- 103.1 MHz Wilcannia River Radio – Wilcannia River Radio – Keeping It Alive
- 99.9 MHz Outback Radio 2WEB – Community radio

=== Wollongong/Nowra ===
FM

- 87.8 MHz [Faith FM]
- 90.9 MHz ABC NewsRadio – ABC
- 93.3 MHz 2RPH – Radio for Print H/C – Future Service
- 94.1 MHz 2LIV (NineFourOne) – Christian Community
- 94.9 MHz Power FM Nowra – Australian Radio Network
- 95.7 MHz ABC Classic – Classical Music
- 96.5 MHz 96.5 Wave FM – Australian Radio Network
- 97.3 MHz ABC Illawarra – ABC
- 98.1 MHz i98FM – WIN Corporation
- 98.9 MHz triple j – ABC
- 99.3 MHz 2MM – Relay of Sydney narrowcast Greek-language radio
- 99.7 MHz Mac FM – Macedonian language narrowcast
- 100.7 MHz Radio Hertz – Macedonian language radio
- 101.1 MHz KIX Country – Australian Radio Network – Country Music Narrowcast Wollongong
- 103.7 MHz Sky Sports Radio – Racing Radio
- 104.5 MHz Triple U FM – Nowra community radio
- 105.3 MHz KIX Country – Australian Radio Network – Country Music Narrowcast Wollongong
- 106.9 MHz VOX FM – Community radio

AM

- 603 kHz ABC Radio National – Also on 1431 kHz
- 999 kHz 2ST Talk/Classic Hits (relays on 91.7 MHz/102.9 MHz/106.7 MHz)
- 1035 kHz SBS Radio – SBS – Also on 1485 kHz
- 1314 kHz Sky Sports Radio Racing Radio (National Racing Radio Network)
- 1575 kHz SEN Track Sports Entertainment Network
- 1611 kHz Oldies Off Air

=== Woodenbong ===
- 87.6 MHz Vision Christian Radio – Narrowcast

=== Yass ===
- 100.3 MHz Yass FM – Community radio
- 107.9 MHz Sky Sports Radio – Racing radio

=== Young ===
FM

- 87.6 MHz Sky Sports Radio – Racing Radio
- 87.8 MHz Vision Christian Radio – Narrowcast
- 92.3 MHz 2YYY – Community radio
- 93.9 MHz Roccy FM – Broadcast Operations Group
- 96.3 MHz ABC Riverina – ABC
- 97.1 MHz Radio National – ABC
- 98.7 MHz SBS Radio – SBS

AM

- 1350 kHz 2LF – Broadcast Operations Group

== Victoria ==
=== Melbourne ===
AM

- 621 kHz ABC Radio National – ABC
- 693 kHz 3AW – Tapt Media
- 774 kHz ABC Radio Melbourne – ABC
- 855 kHz 3CR – Community radio
- 927 kHz RSN – Victorian racing industry
- 1026 kHz ABC News Radio – ABC
- 1116 kHz SEN 1116 – Sports Entertainment Network
- 1179 kHz 3RPH – Radio Print Handicapped Network
- 1224 kHz SBS Radio 1 – Special Broadcasting Service
- 1278 kHz Magic 1278 – Tapt Media
- 1377 kHz 3MP – Easy music – Ace Radio
- 1422 kHz 3XY – Narrowcast Greek language Radio
- 1503 kHz 3KND – South Eastern Indigenous Media Association – Narrowcast
- 1557 kHZ 2MM – Narrowcast Greek language Radio
- 1593 kHz SEN Track – Sports Entertainment Network
- 1611 kHz (Western Melbourne) Vision Christian Radio – Narrowcast
- 1620 kHz 3CW 1620 – Narrowcast Chinese language music service – Bayswater
- 1629 kHz 3CW 1629 – Narrowcast Chinese language music service – Williamstown
- 1638 kHz 2ME – Narrowcast Arabic language Radio
- 1656 kHz Rythmos Radio – Narrowcast Greek language Radio
- 1665 kHz (Eastern Melbourne) Vision Christian Radio – Narrowcast
- 1674 kHz Radio Haanji – Narrowcast Hindi language Radio
- 1683 kHz Hellenic Radio – Narrowcast Greek language Radio
- 1701 kHz Islamic Voice – Narrowcast Arabic language Radio

FM

- 87.6 MHz Kiss FM – Narrowcast club music radio – Melbourne CBD
- 87.6 MHz Hillside Radio – Narrowcast local radio – Bayswater
- 87.6 MHz Surf FM – Narrowcast local radio – Frankston & Cranbourne
- 87.6 MHz Arabic Language Radio Narrowcast – Reservoir
- 87.8 MHz Kiss FM – Narrowcast club music radio – Melbourne's west
- 87.9 MHz Kiss FM – Narrowcast club music radio – Frankston & Mornington Peninsula
- 88.0 MHz DCFM 88 Diamond Creek – Narrowcast Electronic dance music radio – Diamond Creek
- 88.0 MHz J-AIR – Jewish Radio
- 88.3 MHz Southern FM (Melbourne Australia) – Southern Suburbs community radio
- 88.6 MHz Plenty Valley FM – Community radio
- 88.9 MHz Wyn FM – Community radio – Wyndham region
- 89.9 MHz Light FM – Christian community
- 90.7 MHz SYN 90.7 – Youth community
- 91.0 MHz two stations broadcast on this frequency one English SBS rebroadcast and one non English depending on location you get a mix of the two or one or the other.
- 91.5 MHz smoothfm 91.5 – Nova Entertainment
- 92.3 MHz 3ZZZ – multicultural community
- 93.1 MHz SBS Radio – Special Broadcasting Service
- 94.1 MHz 3WBC – Whitehorse Boroondara region
- 94.9 MHz Joy 94.9 – LGBTQI+ community radio
- 95.7 MHz Golden Days Radio – Community radio
- 96.5 MHz 96.5 Inner FM – Heidelberg and Inner Northern Suburbs
- 97.1 MHz 3MDR Mountain Districts Radio – Dandenong Ranges
- 97.7 MHz Casey Radio Casey Radio – South Eastern Suburbs
- 97.9 MHz 979fm – Melton (community radio)
- 98.1 MHz Radio Eastern FM 98.1 – Outer Eastern Suburbs (community radio)
- 98.5 MHz Apple FM Bacchus Marsh
- 98.3 MHz 3RPP – Community radio – Frankston
- 98.7 MHz 3RPP – Community radio – Mornington
- 98.9 MHz North West FM – North Western Suburbs
- 99.1 MHz Yarra Valley FM – Community radio – Woori Yallock
- 99.3 MHz 3NRG – Community radio – Sunbury
- 100.3 MHz Nova 100 – Nova Entertainment
- 100.7 MHz Highlands FM – Community radio – Macedon Ranges
- 101.1 MHz KIIS 101.1 – Australian Radio Network
- 101.9 MHz Fox FM – Southern Cross Austereo
- 102.7 MHz 3RRR – Alternative Contemporary Music
- 103.5 MHz 3MBS – Music Broadcasting Society of Victoria – Classical Music
- 104.3 MHz Gold 104.3 – Australian Radio Network
- 105.1 MHz Triple M – Southern Cross Austereo
- 105.9 MHz ABC Classic – ABC
- 106.7 MHz PBS 106.7FM – Various music genres – Block Programming
- 107.5 MHz triple j – ABC

DAB+

- List of national programmes broadcast in Melbourne
- List of Melbourne programmes

=== Alexandra ===
FM

- 102.9 MHz ABC Goulburn Murray – ABC
- 104.5 MHz Radio National – ABC
- 106.9 MHz UG FM – Community radio

=== Apollo Bay ===
FM

- 88.7 MHz 3OCR (OCR FM) – Community radio
- 95.9 MHz Mixx FM – Repeater of 106.3 MHz in Colac)

=== Ararat ===
- 88.0 MHz Faith FM Network
- 92.9 MHz Vision Christian Radio – Narrowcast
- 98.5 MHz Mixx FM – Part of the Ace Radio Network

=== Bairnsdale ===
FM

- 97.5 MHz Vision Christian Radio – Narrowcast
- 99.9 MHz TRFM – Ace Radio – Repeater of 99.5
- 105.5 MHz Radio East Gippsland – Community radio
- 106.3 MHz Radio National – ABC
- 107.9 MHz ABC NewsRadio – ABC

=== Ballarat ===
FM

- 87.8 MHz Noise FM Three Angels Broadcasting Network
- 88.0 MHz Ballarat Visitor Radio (Operated by 3BA/Power FM)
- 94.3 MHz ABC NewsRadio
- 95.9 MHz SBS Radio
- 99.9 MHz Voice FM 99.9 – Community radio
- 102.3 MHz 3BA – Australian Radio Network
- 103.1 MHz Power FM 103.1 – Australian Radio Network
- 103.9 MHz Good News Radio – Christian radio
- 105.5 MHz ABC Classic – ABC
- 107.1 MHz triple j – ABC
- 107.9 MHz ABC Ballarat – ABC

AM

- 1314 kHz Radio Sport National – (Racing and sports radio network re-broadcasting programs from Melbourne's Radio Sport National)

=== Bendigo ===
FM

- 88.7 MHz 3BPH – Vision Australia Radio (Radio for the Print Handicapped)
- 89.5 MHz ABC NewsRadio – ABC
- 90.3 MHz triple j – ABC
- 91.1 MHz ABC Central Victoria – ABC
- 91.9 MHz hit91.9 Bendigo – Southern Cross Austereo
- 92.7 MHz ABC Classic – ABC
- 93.5 MHz Triple M Bendigo – Southern Cross Austereo
- 96.5 MHz KLFM – Community radio
- 98.3 MHz Gold Central Victoria – Relay of 1071 kHz
- 101.5 MHz Bendigo's Fresh FM – Community radio
- 105.1 MHz Life FM – Christian radio
- 106.7 MHz Phoenix FM – Community radio

AM

- 945 kHz RSN Racing & Sport – (relay of 927 Melbourne- Horse Racing and Sports programming)
- 1071 kHz Gold Central Victoria – Australian Radio Network

=== Bright ===
FM

- 87.6 MHz Valley FM – Narrowcast
- 88.1 MHz ABC Classic – ABC
- 88.9 MHz Radio National – ABC
- 89.7 MHz ABC Goulburn Murray – ABC
- 92.9 MHz Alpine Radio – Community radio

=== Casterton ===
- 104.5 MHz Vision Christian Radio – Narrowcast

=== Castlemaine ===
FM

- 88.0 MHz Radio 88 – Narrowcast Playing 60's Music
- 106.3 MHz KLFM – Community radio
- 94.9 MHz MAIN FM – Community radio
- 87.6 MHz Vision Christian Radio – Narrowcast

=== Charlton ===
- 87.6 MHz Vision Christian Radio – Narrowcast
- 88.0 MHz – Charlton Visitor Radio

=== Chiltern ===
- 88.0 MHz Vision Christian Radio – Narrowcast

=== Colac ===
FM

- 87.6 MHz Vision Christian Radio – Narrowcast
- 88.0 MHz Colac Visitor Information Radio
- 88.4 MHz Faith FM – Narrowcast
- 98.3 MHz 3OCR (OCR FM) – Community radio
- 104.7 MHz ABC NewsRadio Colac and surrounds – ABC
- 106.3 MHz Mixx FM – Ace Radio

AM

- 1134 kHz 3CS – Ace Radio – Talk, Sport, Classic Hits

=== Coleraine ===
- 88.0 MHz Vision Christian Radio – Narrowcast

=== Corryong/Khancoban ===
FM

- 89.7 MHz ABC Riverina – ABC
- 91.3 MHz Radio National – ABC
- 94.9 MHz Revival Time Radio – Christian radio
- 95.7 MHz Hit104.9 – Southern Cross Austereo – Relay of 104.9 from Albury
- 96.5 MHz Triple M – Southern Cross Austereo – Relay of 105.7 from Albury
- 98.1 MHz Radio National – ABC
- 99.7 MHz ABC Goulburn Murray – ABC

=== Daylesford ===
FM

- 87.6 MHz Orbit FM – Dance Culture radio – (Rebroadcast of Kiss FM Australia)

=== Echuca ===
FM

- 87.6 MHz Vision Christian Radio – Narrowcast
- 88.0 MHz Echuca Visitor Information Radio
- 104.7 MHz Radio EMFM – Community radio

The higher powered stations listed in the Deniliquin section can also be received in Echuca.

=== Falls Creek ===
FM

- 94.1 MHz Triple M The Border 105.7 – Southern Cross Austereo – Relay of 105.7 from Albury–Wodonga
- 100.5 MHz Hit104.9 The Border – Southern Cross Austereo – Relay of 104.9 from Albury–Wodonga

=== Geelong ===
FM

- 87.6 MHz Visitor Information
- 87.8 MHz Kiss FM – Narrowcast dance music
- 88.0 MHz Visitor Information
- 89.3 MHz KIX Country – Narrowcast country music – Grant Broadcasters
- 93.9 MHz Bay FM – Grant Broadcasters
- 94.7 MHz 94.7 The Pulse – Community radio
- 95.5 MHz K-Rock – Grant Broadcasters
- 96.3 MHz 96three – Christian Community
- 99.5 MHz 3RPH – Vision Australia Radio (Radio for the Print Handicapped)

Note: Some Geelong stations are audible within parts of the Melbourne Metropolitan Area (especially in the southern bayside suburbs), and higher powered Melbourne-wide radio broadcasting stations can be heard in Geelong.

AM

- 1341 kHz 3GL – playing rock and pop music from the 50's and 60's. Geelong's original station, launched in 1930 before it was converted to FM as K-Rock in 1990. Was relaunched on 1 April 2024, after a period of unofficial broadcasting with the old station sweepers of "3GL on West Coast" and "Classic Hits" from December 2023. Owned by Grand Broadcasters and operated by Geelong Broadcasters, alongside K-Rock and Bay FM.

=== Hamilton ===
FM

- 88.9 MHz Mixx FM – Part of the Ace Radio Network
- 91.7 MHz ABC NewsRadio – ABC
- 92.5 MHz Radio National – ABC
- 93.3 MHz ABC Classic – ABC
- 94.1 MHz ABC Western Victoria – ABC
- 94.9 MHz triple j – ABC
- 102.1 MHz Vision Christian Radio – Narrowcast

AM

- 981 kHz 3HA – Part of the Ace Radio Network

=== Harrietville ===
FM

- 94.5 MHz; Alpine Radio – Community Radio
- 98.7 MHz; ABC Goulburn Murray – ABC Local Radio

=== Heathcote ===
FM

- 87.6 MHz 87 FM (Danceradio)

=== Horsham ===
FM

- 88.0 MHz Sport 927 – Relay Of Racing Radio
- 96.5 MHz Triple H – Community radio
- 99.7 MHz Radio National – ABC
- 101.3 MHz Mixx FM – Part of the Ace Radio Network
- 102.9 MHz Vision Christian Radio – Narrowcast

AM

- 594 kHz ABC Western Victoria – ABC
- 1089 kHz 3WM – Part of the Ace Radio Network

=== Kaniva ===
- 88.0 MHz Vision Christian Radio – Narrowcast

=== Kilmore ===
FM

- 98.3 MHz OKR FM – Community radio

=== Kyneton ===
- 88.0 MHz Vision Christian Radio – Narrowcast
- 100.7 MHz Highlands FM – Community radio

=== Latrobe Valley/Central Gippsland ===
FM

- 87.6 MHz Radio Sport National – Traralgon, Sale (Racing & Sports Radio Network re-broadcasting programs from Melbourne's Radio Sport National)
- 88.0 MHz Radio Sport National – Moe & Morwell (Racing & Sports Radio Network re-broadcasting programs from Melbourne's Radio Sport National)
- 88.0 MHz Latrobe City Council Info Radio (Traralgon City only)
- 91.9 MHz SEN Track – Racing radio
- 92.7 MHz Radio Sport National – Yarram – (Racing & Sports Radio Network re-broadcasting programs from Melbourne's Radio Sport National)
- 93.5 MHz 3RPH/T – Radio for the Print Handicapped (from Warragul)
- 94.3 MHz Triple M Warragul – Southern Cross Austereo
- 95.1 MHz ABC News – ABC
- 96.7 MHz triple j – ABC
- 97.9 MHz Triple M – Southern Cross Austereo
- 99.5 MHz 3TR FM – Part of the Ace Radio Network
- 100.7 MHz ABC Gippsland – ABC
- 101.5 MHz ABC Classic – ABC
- 103.1 MHz West Gippsland Community Radio Inc. 3BBR-FM
- 103.9 MHz Life FM – Christian radio
- 104.7 MHz Gippsland FM – Community radio

AM

- 531 kHz 3GG Warragul
- 828 kHz ABC Gippsland – ABC
- 1242 kHz Gold 1242 – Part of the Ace Radio Network

=== Leongatha ===
FM

- 88.1 MHz South Coast FM – Community radio (also 89.1 MHz & 89.5Mz). Studio in Wonthaggi.
- 91.3 MHz SEN Track – Racing Radio

=== Mallacoota ===
- 87.6 MHz – [Adventist Radio Australia – Narrowcast]
- 88.0 MHz – Vision Christian Radio – Narrowcast
- 101.7 MHz – 3MGB – Community Radio
- 103.3 MHz – ABC Radio National
- 104.9 MHz – ABC Gippsland

=== Mansfield ===
FM

- 99.7 MHz 3MCR – Community radio
- 103.7 MHz ABC Goulburn Murray – ABC
- 105.3 MHz Radio National – ABC

=== Maryborough ===
FM

- 99.1 MHz Goldfields FM

=== Marysville ===
FM

- 89.3 MHz – Flow FM
- 98.5 MHz – UGFM – Community Radio

=== Mildura ===
FM

- 87.6 MHz The Range – Country Music Narrowcast
- 87.8 MHz Vision Christian Radio – Narrowcast
- 88.0 MHz Son-FM88 – Narrowcast (Christian)
- 89.1 MHz Rete Italia – Italian language narrowcast
- 97.9 MHz Triple M Sunraysia – Southern Cross Austereo
- 98.7 MHz SBS Radio – Multilingual
- 99.5 MHz hit99.5 Sunraysia – Southern Cross Austereo
- 100.3 MHz ABC NewsRadio – ABC
- 101.1 MHz triple j – ABC
- 102.7 MHz ABC Classic – ABC
- 104.3 MHz ABC Mildura Swan Hill – ABC
- 105.9 MHz ABC Radio National – ABC
- 106.7 MHz Hot FM – Community radio
- 107.5 MHz 3MPH – Vision Australia Radio (Radio for the Print Handicapped)

AM

- 1359 kHz Radio Sport National – (Racing & Sports Radio Network re-broadcasting programs from Melbourne's Radio Sport National)
- 1467 kHz River 1467 – 3ML – Australian Radio Network
- 1611 kHz 1611AM – Oldies

=== Mount Buller ===
FM

- 91.3 MHz 3SR-FM – Southern Cross Austereo
- 93.7 MHz Star FM – Southern Cross Austereo

=== Murrayville ===
FM

- 103.5 MHz 3MBR – Community radio

=== Nagambie ===
- 88.0 MHz The Range – Narrowcast – Country Music

=== Nhill ===
- 87.6 MHz Vision Christian Radio – Narrowcast

=== Omeo ===
FM

- 90.1 MHz Triple M – Southern Cross Austereo – Relay of 105.7 from Albury
- 90.9 MHz High Country Radio – Community radio – Omeo Town
- 92.5 MHz Hit104.9 – Southern Cross Austereo – Relay of 104.9 from Albury
- 97.3 MHz High Country Radio – Community radio – Omeo Region
- 99.7 MHz Radio National – ABC

AM

- 720 kHz ABC Gippsland – ABC

=== Orbost ===
FM

- 95.5 MHz Radio Sport National – (Racing & Sports Radio Network re-broadcasting programs from Melbourne's Radio Sport National)
- 97.1 MHz ABC Gippsland – ABC
- 98.7 MHz Radio National – ABC

=== Ouyen ===
FM

- 92.9 MHz 3MBR – Community radio – Relay of 103.5 from Murrayville

=== Port Campbell ===
- 88.0 MHz Vision Christian Radio – Narrowcast

=== Portland ===
FM

- 92.9 MHz 3HA – (Relay)
- 93.7 MHz Mixx FM – Ace Radio Network
- 96.9 MHz ABC Western Victoria – ABC
- 98.5 MHz Radio National – ABC
- 99.3 MHz 3RPC – Community radio
- 105.3 MHz Vision Christian Radio – Narrowcast

AM

- 1611 kHz Rete Italia – Italian narrowcast

=== Rosedale ===
FM

- 87.6 MHz Three Angels Broadcasting Network

=== Sale ===
FM

- 87.6 MHz Radio Sport National – (Racing & Sports Radio Network re-broadcasting programs from Melbourne's Radio Sport National)
- 88.0 MHz Faith FM – Narrowcast
- 90.3 MHz Vision Christian Radio – Narrowcast
- 90.7 MHz 3REG – Community radio – Lakes Entrance
- 91.9 MHz Kids FM – Kids radio station
- 99.5 MHz TR-FM – Part of the Ace Radio Network – Central Gippsland
- 99.9 MHz TR-FM – Part of the Ace Radio Network – East Gippsland
- 100.7 MHz ABC Gippsland – ABC
- 103.9 MHz Life FM – Christian Community
- 105.5 MHz 3REG – Community radio – Bairnsdale only
- 106.3 MHz Radio National – ABC – Bairnsdale only

AM

- 828 kHz ABC Gippsland – ABC
- 1242 kHz Gold 1242 – Part of the Ace Radio Network

=== Seymour ===
FM

- 87.6 MHz Hit Radio 87.6
- 99.3 MHz Music Narrowcast
- 103.9 MHz Seymour FM Community radio

=== Shepparton ===
FM

- 87.6 MHz Raw FM – Dance Music
- 88.0 MHz The Range – Country Music
- 94.5 MHz triple j – ABC
- 95.3 MHz Triple M Goulburn Valley – Southern Cross Austereo
- 96.1 MHz ABC Classic – ABC
- 96.9 MHz hit96.9 Goulburn Valley – Southern Cross Austereo
- 97.7 MHz ABC Goulburn Murray – ABC
- 98.5 MHz ONE FM 98.5 – Community radio
- 100.1 MHz 3SPH – Vision Australia Radio (Radio for Print Handicapped)
- 107.7 MHz ABC News Radio – ABC

AM

- 621 kHz ABC Radio National – ABC
- 1260 kHz RSN Racing & Sport – Relay of 927 kHz Melbourne
- 1413 kHz Vision Christian Radio – Narrowcast
- 1629 kHz Niche Radio Network – Narrowcast World Talk

=== St Arnaud ===
- 106.1 MHz Vision Christian Radio – Narrowcast

=== Stawell ===
- 87.6 MHz [Faith FM] – Christian radio
- 93.7 MHz Vision Christian Radio – Narrowcast

=== Swan Hill ===
FM

- 99.1 MHz Smart FM – Community radio
- 102.1 MHz ABC Mildura Swan Hill – ABC
- 103.7 MHz ABC Classic – ABC
- 105.3 MHz triple j – ABC
- 106.9 MHz Sport 927 – Relay of Racing Radio
- 107.7 MHz Mixx FM – Part of the Ace Radio Network

AM

- 1332 MHz 3SH – Part of the Ace Radio Network

=== Swifts Creek ===
FM

- 91.7 MHz High Country Radio – Community radio – Relay of 97.3 Omeo
- 103.5 MHz Radio National – ABC

=== Terang ===
- 90.5 MHz Vision Christian Radio – Narrowcast

=== Wangaratta ===
FM

- 87.6 MHz Orbit FM – Relay of Kiss FM – Dance Radio – Narrowcast
- 88.0 MHz & 87.8 MHz Vision Christian Radio – Narrowcast
- 99.3 MHz RSN – Radio Sport National – Racing Radio – Narrowcast
- 101.3 MHz Oak FM – Community radio
- 102.1 MHz Edge FM – North East Broadcasters

AM

- 756 kHz Radio National – ABC
- 1566 kHz 1566 3NE – North East Broadcasters

=== Warracknabeal ===
- 100.5 MHz Vision Christian Radio – Narrowcast

=== Warrnambool ===
FM

- 87.6 MHz Orbit FM – Relay of Kiss FM (Port Fairy area)
- 89.7 MHz triple j – ABC
- 91.3 MHz ABC News – ABC
- 92.1 MHz ABC Classic – ABC
- 94.5 MHz 3YB FM – Ace Radio Network
- 95.3 MHz Coast FM 95.3 – Ace Radio Network
- 100.9 MHz Vision Christian Radio – Narrowcast
- 101.7 MHz Radio National – ABC
- 103.7 MHz 3WAY FM – Community radio

AM

- 882 kHz 3RPH – Radio For The Print Handicapped
- 1602 kHz ABC Western Victoria – ABC

=== Wedderburn ===
FM

- 87.6 MHz Wedderburn Visitor Radio

=== Wodonga ===
- 88.4 MHz Wodonga Community Radio – TAFE radio – Narrowcast
- 89.5 MHz SBS Radio 1 – SBS – Narrowcast
- 98.5 MHz The Light – Community Christian
- 100.9 MHz ABC News Radio – ABC
- 103.3 MHz triple j – ABC
- 104.1 MHz ABC Classic – ABC
- 106.5 MHz ABC Goulburn Murray – ABC

AM

- 990 kHz ABC Radio National – ABC

Note: Albury–Wodonga are twin cities, with Wodonga in Victoria and Albury in New South Wales. Therefore, listings of radio stations in either category can be received in both areas.

=== Woori Yallock ===
- 87.6 MHz Vision Christian Radio – Narrowcast
- 96.1 MHz ABC Melbourne – Relay of ABC Melbourne on 774 kHz
- 99.1 MHz 3VYV Yarra Valley FM

=== Yarrawonga ===
- 87.6 MHz Vision Christian Radio – Narrowcast

=== Yea ===
- 88.9 MHz UG FM – Community radio – Relay of 106.9 from Alexandra
- 93.7 MHz Hit93.7 – Relay of 96.9 from Shepparton – Southern Cross Austereo

== Queensland ==
=== Brisbane ===
AM

- 612 kHz 612 ABC Brisbane (4QR) – ABC (Talk/News/Information)
- 693 kHz 4KQ – 693 SENQ Sports Entertainment Network
- 792 kHz 4RN – Radio National – ABC (Information Variety)
- 882 kHz 4BC – Tapt Media (Talk/News/Information)
- 936 kHz ABC NewsRadio – ABC (News)
- 1008 kHz Radio TAB (Betting/Racing)
- 1053 kHz SEN Track – Sports Entertainment Network Narrowcast
- 1116 kHz 4BH – Tapt Media (Easy Listening)
- 1197 kHz Switch 1197 (Youth community radio)
- 1296 kHz 4RPH (Radio for Print Handicapped)
- 1647 kHz Arabic Radio – relay of 2ME Radio Arabic from Sydney
- 1656 kHz VAC Radio (Chinese language)
- 1701 kHz Radio Brisvaani (Hindi language narrowcast)

FM

- 87.6 MHz/87.8 MHz/88.0 MHz (various suburbs) Vision Christian Radio – Narrowcast
- 87.8 MHz [Deception Bay] Faith FM Narrowcast (Christian)
- 88.0 MHz (Brisbane CBD) Planet Radio (Environmental narrowcast)
- 90.5 MHz Rebel FM (Logan) – Rebel Radio Network PL
- 92.1 MHz The Breeze (Logan) – Rebel Radio Network PL
- 93.3 MHz SBS Radio (International languages)
- 94.9 MHz River 94.9 – Australian Radio Network (Music Variety)
- 96.5 MHz 96five Family FM (Christian community)
- 97.3 MHz KIIS 97.3 – Australian Radio Network/Nova Entertainment (Music and Lifestyle)
- 98.1 MHz 4EB (Ethnic community radio)
- 98.9 MHz 98.9 FM (4AAA) (Indigenous community radio/Country music)
- 99.7 MHz 99.7 BridgeFM (4RED) (Redcliffe community radio; variety)
- 100.3 MHz Bay FM (4BAY) (Bayside community radio; variety)
- 101.1 MHz 101.1 FM (4CBL) (Logan community Radio; variety)
- 101.5 MHz 4OUR FM (Caboolture community radio; variety)
- 102.1 MHz 4ZZZ (Youth community radio)
- 103.7 MHz 4MBS (Classical music community radio)
- 104.5 MHz Triple M – Southern Cross Austereo (Rock/NRL)
- 105.3 MHz B105 FM – Southern Cross Austereo (New Hits)
- 106.1 MHz ABC Classic – ABC (Classical Music)
- 106.9 MHz Nova 106.9 – Nova Entertainment (New Hits/Dance/Youth)
- 107.7 MHz triple j – ABC (Alternative)

DAB+ (metropolitan and regional)

- Double J
- ABC Country
- ABC Extra
- ABC Jazz
- ABC Grandstand
- SBS Chill
- SBS PopAsia
- The Edge Digital – Australian Radio Network
- MBS Light – light classical
- Mix '80s – Australian Radio Network
- Mix '90s – Australian Radio Network
- Chemist Warehouse Remix – Australian Radio Network
- Koffee – Nova Entertainment
- smoothfm – Nova Entertainment
- Triple M Classic Rock Digital – Southern Cross Austereo
- Koffee – Nova Entertainment
- OldSkool Radio – Southern Cross Austereo
- Australian Indian Radio – Online Hindi Radio

=== Allora ===
- 87.6 MHz Vision Christian Radio – Narrowcast
- 88.0 MHz [Three Angels Broadcasting Network] – Christian radio

=== Aloomba ===
- 88.0 MHz Vision Christian Radio – Narrowcast

=== Atherton ===
- 88.0 MHz Vision Christian Radio – Narrowcast
- 99.1 MHz SEN Track – Sports Entertainment Network

=== Augathella ===
FM

- 88.0 MHz Radio TAB – Relay from 1008 Brisbane
- 106.1 MHz 4VL – Smart Radio Group – Relay of 918 Charleville
- 107.7 MHz Radio National – ABC

=== Ayr ===
FM

- 96.1 MHz SBS Radio – SBS
- 97.1 MHz Sweet FM – Narrowcaster

=== Babinda ===
FM

- 87.6 MHz Vision Christian Radio – Narrowcast
- 94.1 MHz ABC Far North – ABC
- 94.9 MHz Kool FM – Coastal Broadcasters
- 95.7 MHz Radio National – ABC
- 102.5 MHz 4KZ – Coastal Broadcasters

=== Barcaldine ===
- 87.6 MHz Vision Christian Radio – Narrowcast

=== Beachmere ===
- 87.6 MHz [Adventist Radio Australia – Narrowcast]
- 88.0 MHz Vision Christian Radio – Narrowcast

=== Beaudesert ===
FM

- 87.6 MHz [Adventist Radio Australia – Narrowcast]
- 88.0 MHz Vision Christian Radio – Narrowcast
- 89.7 MHz Radio TAB – Relay of 1008 Brisbane
- 90.5 MHz Rebel FM – Rebel Radio Network PL
- 92.1 MHz The Breeze – Rebel Radio Network PL
- 101.5 MHz Beau FM – Community radio

=== Beechmont ===
- 87.8 MHz Vision Christian Radio – Narrowcast

=== Beerwah ===
- 88.0 MHz Vision Christian Radio – Narrowcast

=== Bell ===
- 88.0 MHz Vision Christian Radio – Narrowcast

=== Biloela ===
- 87.6 MHz Radio TAB – TX Site: Commercial Hotel – Power: 1W
- 88.0 MHz KIX Country – Power : 1w
- 88.9 MHz Rebel FM – Rebel Radio Network PL – TX Site: Banana Range – Power: 400w
- 89.7 MHz The Breeze – Rebel Radio Network PL – TX Site: Banana Range – Power: 400w
- 90.1 MHz Vision Christian Radio – Narrowcast
- 94.9 MHz ABC Capricornia – Owned by: ABC – TX Site: Telstra Tower Biloela – Power: 10w
- 101.1 MHz Rebroadcast of 95.1 MHz Triple M Central Queensland – Owned and Maintained by: Callide Mine under permission from Southern Cross Austereo – TX Site: Mt Murchision – Power: 320w E.I.R.P
- 102.7 MHz Rebroadcast of 666 kHz 4CC – Owned and Maintained by: Callide Mine under permission from Australian Radio Network – TX Site: Mt Murchision – Power: 320w E.I.R.P

AM

- 666 kHz 4CC – Owned by: Australian Radio Network – TX Site: 299 Burnett Hwy PROSPECT – Power: 2 kW

=== Blackall ===
FM

- 87.6 MHz Vision Christian Radio – Narrowcast
- 95.1 MHz West FM – Relay of 104.5 Longreach
- 98.3 MHz Radio TAB – Relay of 1008 Brisbane
- 100.7 MHz 4LG – Relay of 1098 Longreach
- 103.1 MHz SBS Radio – SBS
- 107.9 MHz Radio National – ABC

=== Blackwater ===
- 87.6 MHz Vision Christian Radio – Narrowcast

=== Boonah ===
- 87.6 MHz Vision Christian Radio – Narrowcast
- 100.1 MHz Rim FM (Community radio)

=== Bowen ===
FM

- 93.5 MHz Vision Christian Radio – Narrowcast
- 92.7 MHz Radio National – ABC
- 98.3 MHz 4TO – Southern Cross Austereo – (relay from Townsville)
- 95.1 MHz Gem FM – Community radio
- 107.9 MHz hit103.1 Townsville – Southern Cross Austereo – (relay from Townsville)

AM

- 1611 kHz Rete Italia – Italian Radio

=== Bundaberg ===
FM

- 93.1 MHz 93.1 Bundaberg
- 93.9 MHz Hitz939 – Australian Radio Network
- 94.7 MHz Coral Coast FM (Community Radio)
- 95.5 MHz Radio TAB (Betting/Racing)
- 96.3 MHz Phoenix FM (Community Radio)
- 97.1 MHz KIX Country (Narrowcast) Australian Radio Network
- 98.5 MHz ABC Classic – ABC (Classical Music)
- 99.3 MHz triple j – ABC (Alternative)
- 100.1 MHz ABC Wide Bay – ABC (Talk/News/Music/Information)
- 100.9 MHz Radio National – ABC (Information Variety)
- 102.5 MHz The Breeze (Wide Bay) – Rebel Radio Network PL
- 105.1 MHz Rhema FM Wide Bay (Christian Community Radio)
- 106.7 MHz Rebel FM (Wide Bay) – Rebel Radio Network PL

AM

- 855 kHz ABC Wide Bay – ABC (Talk/News/Music/Information)
- 1332 kHz 4BU – Australian Radio Network

=== Cairns ===
FM

- 87.6 MHz Vision Christian Radio – Narrowcast
- 87.8 MHz Orbit FM – Dance music narrowcast, simulcast of Kiss FM Australia
- 88.0 MHz Orbit FM – Dance music narrowcast, simulcast of Kiss FM Australia
- 89.1 MHz Cairns FM – Community radio
- 90.5 MHz SBS Radio – SBS
- 98.7 MHz 4CIM – Indigenous community radio
- 99.5 MHz Triple M Cairns – Southern Cross Austereo
- 101.1 MHz ABC NewsRadio – ABC
- 101.9 MHz Coast FM – Youth community radio
- 102.7 MHz Star 102.7 – Australian Radio Network
- 103.5 MHz hit103.5 Cairns – Southern Cross Austereo
- 104.3 MHz Radio TAB – Horse racing narrowcast
- 105.1 MHz Radio National – ABC
- 105.9 MHz ABC Classic – ABC
- 106.7 MHz ABC Far North – ABC
- 107.5 MHz triple j – ABC

AM

- 801 kHz ABC Far North – ABC
- 846 kHz 4CA – Australian Radio Network

=== Cairns North ===
FM

- 93.9 MHz Radio National – ABC
- 94.7 MHz ABC Classic – ABC
- 95.5 MHz ABC Far North – ABC Local Radio
- 96.3 MHz ABC News – ABC
- 97.1 MHz triple j – ABC

=== Cardwell ===
- 91.9 MHz Kool FM – Coastal Broadcasters

=== Capella ===
- 88.0 MHz Vision Christian Radio – Narrowcast

=== Chambers Flat ===
- 87.6 MHz Vision Christian Radio – Narrowcast

=== Charleville ===
FM

- 87.6 MHz Vision Christian Radio – Narrowcast
- 88.0 MHz Radio Charlie – Narrowcast
- 101.7 MHz Triple C – Smart Radio Group
- 104.1 MHz Radio TAB (Betting/Racing)
- 107.3 MHz Radio National – ABC

AM

- 603 kHz ABC Western Qld – ABC
- 918 kHz 4VL – Smart Radio Group

=== Charters Towers ===
FM

- 88.0 MHz Vision Christian Radio – Narrowcast
- 93.5 MHz SBS Radio – SBS
- 94.3 MHz Radio TAB – Relay of 1008 Brisbane
- 95.9 MHz hit95.9 Charters Towers – Southern Cross Austereo
- 96.7 MHz Vision Christian Radio – Narrowcast
- 97.5 MHz Radio National – ABC

AM

- 828 kHz 4GC – Resonate Broadcasting

=== Chinchilla ===
- 87.6 MHz Vision Christian Radio – Narrowcast
- 88.0 MHz [Three Angels Broadcasting Network FM] – Christian radio
- 95.5 MHz The Breeze – Rebel Radio Network PL
- 97.1 MHz Rebel FM – Rebel Radio Network PL

=== Clermont ===
FM

- 87.6 MHz Vision Christian Radio – Narrowcast
- 102.1 MHz 4HI – Smart Radio Group
- 103.7 MHz SBS Radio – SBS
- 104.5 MHz ABC Classic – ABC
- 106.1 MHz Radio TAB – Relay of 1008 Brisbane
- 107.7 MHz Radio National – ABC

=== Cloncurry ===
FM

- 87.6 MHz Vision Christian Radio – Narrowcast
- 89.3 MHz triple j – ABC
- 90.5 MHz ABC Classic – ABC
- 100.5 MHz ABC West Qld – ABC
- 103.7 MHz Radio TAB – Relay of 1008 Brisbane
- 105.3 MHz triple j – ABC
- 106.1 MHz SBS Radio – SBS
- 107.7 MHz Radio National – ABC

AM

- 693 kHz 4LM – Smart Radio Group – Relay of 666 from Mount Isa

=== Collinsville ===
- 87.6 MHz Vision Christian Radio – Narrowcast

=== Cooktown ===
- 101.7 MHz Rebel FM – Rebel Radio Network PL
- 103.3 MHz Radio TAB (Betting/Racing)
- 105.7 MHz ABC Far North – ABC
- 107.3 MHz Radio National – ABC

=== Cowley ===
- 88.0 MHz Vision Christian Radio – Narrowcast

=== Crows Nest ===
- 87.6 Adventist Radio Australia – Narrowcast

=== Cunnamulla ===
- 102.9 MHz Vision Christian Radio – Narrowcast

AM

- 1584 kHz 4VL (relay)

=== Currumbin ===
- 88.0 MHz – Country Music Narrowcast
- 104.1 MHz – Radio 97 (2MW translator) – Commercial

=== Dalby ===
FM

- 87.8 MHz Three Angels Broadcasting Network FM – Christian radio
- 88.0 MHz Vision Christian Radio – Narrowcast
- 89.9 MHz 4DDD – Community radio
- 94.3 MHz Radio TAB – Relay of 1008 Brisbane
- 95.9 MHz 4WK – Broadcast Operations Group – Relay of 963 from Toowoomba
- 97.5 MHz CFM – Southern Cross Austereo – Relay of 100.7 from Toowoomba

AM

- 1611 kHz Rete Italia – Italian Radio
- 1629 kHz Hot Country – Smart Radio Group Country Music

=== Darling Downs (Toowoomba/Warwick) ===
FM

- 87.6 MHz Toowoomba City FM/Warwick Christian Radio
- 88.0 MHz and 87.8 MHz Power FM Toowoomba–Lockyer Valley–Highfields district (Training Radio Station)
- 91.5 MHz Country FM (Country Music Narrowcast)
- 92.9 MHz Voice FM (Christian community radio)
- 93.7 MHz Radio TAB (Betting/Racing)
- 96.7 MHz ABC NewsRadio – ABC (News)
- 99.1 MHz Kids FM (Kids Narrowcast)
- 100.7 MHz hit100.7 Darling Downs – Southern Cross Austereo
- 102.7 MHz 4DDB (Community radio)
- 103.3 MHz triple j – ABC (Warwick repeater)
- 103.9 MHz 4TTT (Community radio)
- 104.1 MHz triple j – ABC (Toowoomba repeater)
- 105.7 MHz Radio National – ABC (Information Variety)
- 107.3 MHz ABC Classic – ABC (Classical Music)

AM

- 747 kHz ABC Southern Queensland – ABC (Talk/News/Information)
- 864 kHz Triple M Darling Downs – Southern Cross Austereo
- 963 kHz 4WK – Broadcast Operations Group
- 1242 kHz 4AK – Broadcast Operations Group
- 1620 kHz The Breeze – Rebel Radio Network PL

Brisbane FM stations are also audible in the Toowoomba area.

=== East Greenmount ===
- 88.0 MHz Vision Christian Radio – Narrowcast

=== East Palmerston ===
- 88.0 MHz Vision Christian Radio – Narrowcast

=== Emerald ===
- 87.6 MHz Adventist Radio Australia – Narrowcast
- 88.0 MHz KIX Country – Australian Radio Network
- 90.7 MHz ABC Classic – ABC (Classical Music)
- 92.3 MHz Vision Christian Radio – Narrowcast
- 93.9 MHz Radio National – ABC (Information Variety)
- 94.7 MHz Hit Central Queensland – Southern Cross Austereo
- 95.5 MHz Radio TAB (Betting/Racing)

AM

- 1143 kHz 4HI – Resonate Broadcasting
- 1548 kHz ABC Capricornia – ABC
- 1611 kHz Hot Country – Macquarie Regional Radio Network

=== Gayndah ===
- 87.6 MHz Vision Christian Radio – Narrowcast
- 91.5fm Burnett River Community radio

=== Gladstone ===
FM

- 87.6 MHz Adventist Radio Australia – Narrowcast
- 88.0 MHz KIX Country – Australian Radio Network
- 91.9 MHz 91.9 Fresh FM (Christian community radio)
- 93.5 MHz Hit Central Queensland – Southern Cross Austereo
- 94.3 MHz Radio TAB (Betting/Racing)
- 95.1 MHz Triple M Central Queensland – Southern Cross Austereo
- 95.9 MHz Radio National – ABC (Information Variety)
- 99.1 MHz ABC Capricornia – Australian Broadcasting Corporation (News/Talk/Information)

AM

- 927 kHz 4CC – Australian Radio Network

=== Glen Aplin ===
- 87.6 MHz Vision Christian Radio – Narrowcast

=== Glenden ===
- 88.0 MHz Vision Christian Radio – Narrowcast

=== Glenlee ===
- 87.8 MHz Vision Christian Radio – Narrowcast

=== Gold Coast ===
FM

- 87.6 MHz Raw FM – Dance music narrowcast
- 87.8 MHz / 88.0 MHz Vision Christian Radio – Narrowcast
- 88.0 MHz Beach FM
- 88.5 MHz ABC Classic – Classical music – ABC
- 89.3 MHz 4CRB – Community radio
- 90.1 MHz Radio National – ABC
- 90.9 MHz Sea FM 90.9 – Contemporary hit radio – Southern Cross Austereo
- 91.7 MHz ABC Coast FM – ABC Local Radio – ABC
- 92.5 MHz Triple M Gold – Adult contemporary – Southern Cross Austereo
- 94.1 MHz Jazz Radio 94.1FM – Jazz music – Community radio
- 95.7 MHz NewsRadio – Rolling news – ABC
- 97.7 MHz triple j – Alternative music – ABC
- 99.4 MHz Rebel FM – Active rock – Rebel Radio Network PL
- 100.6 MHz The Breeze – Classic hits – Rebel Radio Network PL
- 102.9 MHz Hot Tomato – Adult contemporary
- 105.7 MHz Radio Metro – Youth – Community radio
- 107.3 MHz Juice107.3 – Christian community radio

AM

- 1620 kHz SEN Track – Sports Entertainment Network
- 1692 kHz Station X – Adult contemporary

DAB+

- Rabbit Radio – (Independent Culture Portal)

=== Goondiwindi ===
- 87.6 MHz Vision Christian Radio – Narrowcast
- 96.3 MHz Rebel FM – Rebel Radio Network PL
- 98.7 MHz The Breeze – Rebel Radio Network PL
- 88.7 MHz Now FM – Broadcast Operations Group
- 89.5 MHz 2VM – Broadcast Operations Group
- 90.3 MHz Radio TAB – Relay of Racing Radio
- 92.7 MHz ABC South Qld – ABC
- 94.3 MHz Radio National – ABC

AM

- 1611 kHz Hot Country Radio Queensland

=== Gordonvale ===
- 87.6 MHz Vision Christian Radio – Narrowcast

=== Gracemere ===
- 87.8 MHz Vision Christian Radio – Narrowcast

AM

- 837 kHz ABC Capricornia

=== Gympie ===
- 96.1 MHz Zinc 96.1 – Australian Radio Network
- 91.5 MHz Cooloola Christian Radio (Christian Community Radio)

AM

- 558 kHz 4GY

=== Hervey Bay/Maryborough ===
FM

- 87.8 MHz BayCity Gold Radio (Booral & Turtle Cove)
- 88.0 MHz BayCity Gold Radio (River Heads)
- 87.8 MHz Three Angels Broadcasting Network – Narrowcast
- 92.3 MHz KIX Country – Australian Radio Network
- 97.7 MHz ABC News Radio – ABC
- 98.5 MHz ABC Classic – ABC
- 99.3 MHz triple j – ABC
- 100.1 MHz ABC Wide Bay – ABC
- 100.9 MHz Radio National – ABC
- 101.9 MHz hit101.9 Fraser Coast – Southern Cross Austereo
- 102.5 MHz The Breeze (Wide Bay) – Rebel Radio Network PL
- 103.5 MHz Triple M Fraser Coast – Southern Cross Austereo
- 105.1 MHz Rhema FM Wide Bay – Wide Bay Christian Broadcasters
- 106.7 MHz Rebel FM (Wide Bay) – Rebel Radio Network PL
- 107.5 MHz Fraser Coast FM – Frasercoast Community Radio

AM

- 855 kHz ABC Wide Bay – ABC
- 1161 kHz Radio TAB (Betting/Racing)

=== Highfields ===
- 87.6 MHz – Highfields FM
- 88.0 MHz – Vision Christian Radio – Narrowcast

=== Ingham ===
- 96.9 MHz SEN Track Sports Entertainment Network
- 99.1 MHz Vision Christian Radio – Narrowcast

=== Inglewood ===
- 88.0 MHz Vision Christian Radio – Narrowcast

=== Injune ===
- 101.9 MHz KIX Country – Australian Radio Network

=== Innisfail ===
- 87.6 MHz Vision Christian Radio – Narrowcast
- 98.3 MHz Kool FM – Coastal Broadcasters
- 531 kHz & 102.5 MHz 4KZ – Coastal Broadcasters

=== Ipswich ===
- 87.6 MHz/88.0 MHz Vision Christian Radio – Narrowcast
- 88.0 MHz KIX Country – Australian Radio Network
- 94.9 MHz River 94.9 – serving the Ipswich/Lockyer Valley/Toowoomba area – Australian Radio Network

=== Jimboomba ===
- 87.6 MHz/88.0 MHz Vision Christian Radio – Narrowcast

=== Julia Creek ===
- 87.8 MHz Vision Christian Radio – Narrowcast

=== Kallangur ===
- 88.0 MHz Vision Christian Radio – Narrowcast

=== Kilcoy ===
- 87.6 MHz Vision Christian Radio – Narrowcast
- 88.0 MHz Three Angels Broadcasting Network – Narrowcast

=== Killarney ===
- 87.6 MHz Vision Christian Radio – Narrowcast

=== Kingaroy ===
FM

- 87.6 MHz Vision Christian Radio – Narrowcast
- 87.8 MHz Three Angels Broadcasting Network Australia [Narrowcast]
- 89.1 MHz hit89.1 South Burnett – Southern Cross Austereo
- 90.7 mHz CROW FM 90.7 (Local Music Station)
- 93.1 MHz Radio TAB (Betting/Racing)

AM

- 1071 kHz 4SB – 4SB 1071 – Resonate Broadcasting

=== Longreach ===
FM

- 87.6 MHz Vision Christian Radio – Narrowcast
- 99.1 MHz Radio National – ABC
- 102.1 MHz ABC Classic – ABC
- 103.7 MHz Radio TAB (Betting/Racing)
- 104.5 MHz West FM
- 106.1 MHz triple j – ABC

AM

- 540 kHz ABC Western Queensland – ABC
- 1098 kHz 4LG

=== Mackay ===
- 87.6 MHz Classic Gold 87.6 FM (Oldies Narrowcast)
- 87.8 MHz/88.0 MHz Vision Christian Radio – Narrowcast
- 93.9 MHz KIX Country – Australian Radio Network
- 97.9 MHz ABC Classic – ABC (Classical Music)
- 98.7 MHz Triple M Mackay & The Whitsundays – Southern Cross Austereo
- 99.5 MHz triple j – ABC (Alternative)
- 100.3 MHz hit100.3 Mackay – Southern Cross Austereo
- 101.1 MHz ABC Tropical North – ABC (Talk/News/Information)
- 101.9 MHz Star 101.9 – Australian Radio Network
- 102.9 MHz Radio National – ABC (Information Variety)
- 103.5 MHz Radio TAB (Betting/Racing)
- 107.5 MHz 4CRM (Community radio)

AM

- 1026 kHz – 4MK – Australian Radio Network
- 1647 kHz Vision Christian Radio – Narrowcast

=== Maleny ===
- 87.6 MHz Vision Christian Radio – Narrowcast

=== Mareeba ===
- 87.6 MHz Adventist Radio Australia – Narrowcast
- 88.0 MHz/92.3 MHz Vision Christian Radio – Narrowcast
- 97.9 MHz hit97.9 Tablelands – Southern Cross Austereo

=== Miles ===
- 87.6 MHz Vision Christian Radio – Narrowcast
- 94.5 MHz Rebel FM – Rebel Radio Network PL
- 101.3 MHz The Breeze – Rebel Radio Network PL

=== Millmerran ===
- 88.0 MHz Vision Christian Radio – Narrowcast
- 88.0 MHz Three Angels Broadcasting Network Australia – Narrowcast

=== Mitchell ===
- 88.0 MHz Vision Christian Radio – Narrowcast
- 104.5 MHz 4ZR (Relay)

=== Monto ===
- 87.6 MHz Vision Christian Radio – Narrowcast
- 88.0 MHz Australian Visitor Radio

=== Moranbah ===
- 96.9 MHz – 4RFM Community radio
- 87.6 MHz Vision Christian Radio – Narrowcast

=== Moresby ===
- 87.6 MHz Vision Christian Radio – Narrowcast

=== Moura ===
- 87.6 MHz Vision Christian Radio – Narrowcast
- 88.0 MHz KIX Country – Australian Radio Network
- 96.1 MHz ABC Capricornia
- 96.9 MHz ABC Radio National

=== Mourilyan ===
- 87.6 MHz Vision Christian Radio – Narrowcast

=== Mundubbera ===
- 88.0 MHz Vision Christian Radio – Narrowcast

=== Murgon ===
- 87.6 MHz Adventist Radio Australia – Narrowcast
- 88.0 MHz Vision Christian Radio – Narrowcast

=== Mount Isa ===
FM

- 87.6 MHz Adventist Radio Australia – Narrowcast
- 88.0 MHz Vision Christian Radio – Narrowcast
- 100.9 MHz Mob FM – Community radio
- 101.7 MHz ABC Classic – ABC
- 102.5 MHz hit102.5 Mount Isa – Southern Cross Austereo
- 103.3 MHz Radio TAB – Relay from 1008 Brisbane
- 104.1 MHz triple j – ABC
- 106.5 MHz ABC West Qld – ABC
- 107.3 MHz Radio National – ABC

AM

- 666 kHz Zinc666 – Smart Radio Group

=== Nanango ===
AM

- 1692 kHz Vision Christian Radio – Narrowcast

FM

- 88.0 MHz Adventist Radio Australia – Narrowcast

=== Narangba ===
- 87.8 MHz Vision Christian Radio – Narrowcast

=== Nebo ===
- 88.0 MHz Vision Christian Radio – Narrowcast

=== Normanton ===
- 87.6 MHz Vision Christian Radio – Narrowcast

=== Nundah ===
- 87.8 MHz Vision Christian Radio – Narrowcast

=== Nyngan ===
- 100.7 MHz Outback Radio 2WEB – Community radio

=== Oakey ===
- 87.6 MHz Vision Christian Radio – Narrowcast

=== Pittsworth ===
- 88.0 MHz Vision Christian Radio – Narrowcast

=== Proston ===
- 88.0 MHz Vision Christian Radio – Narrowcast

=== Quilpie ===
- 87.6 MHz Vision Christian Radio – Narrowcast
- 104.5 MHz 4VL (Relay)

=== Rainbow Beach ===
- 87.6 MHz Vision Christian Radio – Narrowcast

=== Rockhampton ===
FM

- 87.6 MHz/88.0 MHz Vision Christian Radio – Narrowcast
- 92.7 MHz KIX Country (Country music) – Australian Radio Network
- 98.5 MHz 4YOU (Community radio)
- 99.9 MHz Radio TAB (Betting/Racing)
- 100.7 MHz 4US (Indigenous community radio)
- 101.5 MHz Triple M Central Queensland – Southern Cross Austereo
- 103.1 MHz Radio National – ABC (Information Variety)
- 104.7 MHz triple j – ABC (Alternative)
- 105.5 MHz ABC News – ABC
- 106.3 MHz ABC Classic – ABC (Classical Music)
- 107.9 MHz Hit Central Queensland – Southern Cross Austereo

AM

- 837 kHz ABC Capricornia – ABC (Talk/News/Information)
- 990 kHz 4RO – Australian Radio Network
- 1584 kHz 4CC – Australian Radio Network

=== Roma ===
FM

- 87.6 MHz Vision Christian Radio – Narrowcast
- 94.3 MHz Radio TAB (Betting/Racing)
- 95.1 MHz hit95.1 Maranoa – Southern Cross Austereo
- 97.7 MHz ABC Classic – ABC (Classical Music)
- 103.3 MHz triple j – ABC (Alternative)
- 105.7 MHz ABC Local Radio – ABC (Talk/News/Information)
- 107.3 MHz Radio National – ABC (Information Variety)

AM

- 1476 kHz 4ZR – Resonate Broadcasting
- 1611 kHz Hot Country 1611 – Smart Radio Group
- 1638 kHz Station X – Adult Contemporary

=== Sarina ===
- 88.0 MHz Vision Christian Radio – Narrowcast

=== South Johnstone ===
- 88.0 MHz Vision Christian Radio – Narrowcast

=== Springsure ===
- 87.6 MHz Vision Christian Radio – Narrowcast

=== St George ===
FM Radio

- 87.6 MHz Vision180 Radio – Narrowcast (Christian, youth)
- 102.1 MHz Vision Christian Radio – Narrowcast
- 105.3 MHz 4ZR (relay)

AM Radio

- 1611 kHz Hot Country 1611 – Smart Radio Group

=== Stanthorpe ===
- 87.6 MHz Vision Christian Radio – Narrowcast
- 88.0 MHz Adventist Radio Australia – Narrowcast
- 90.1 MHz The Breeze – Rebel Radio Network PL
- 91.5 MHz 4WK – Repeater of 963 service from Toowoomba – Broadcast Operations Group
- 93.1 MHz TAB Radio – Racing from Brisbane's 1008
- 97.1 MHz Rebel FM – Rebel Radio Network PL
- 97.9 MHz hit100.7 Darling Downs – Repeater of 100.7 service from Toowoomba
- 98.7 MHz TEN-FM – Community radio
- 99.5 MHz 4AK – Repeater of 1242 service from Toowoomba – Broadcast Operations Group
- 100.3 MHz Triple M Darling Downs – Repeater of 864 service from Toowoomba

=== Sunshine Coast ===
FM

- 87.6 MHz Village FM – Narrowcast classic hits
- 87.6 MHz Yandina Adventist Radio Australia – Narrowcast
- 88.0 MHz Nambour Adventist Radio Australia – Narrowcast
- 88.0 MHz Caloundra Adventist Radio Australia – Narrowcast
- 88.7 MHz ABC Classic – Classical music – ABC
- 89.5 MHz triple j – Alternative music – ABC
- 90.3 MHz ABC Sunshine Coast – ABC Local Radio – ABC
- 91.1 MHz Hot 91.1 – Contemporary hit radio – Australian Radio Network
- 91.9 MHz 91.9 Sea FM – Contemporary hit radio – Great Southern Land Media Group
- 92.7 MHz 92.7 Mix FM – Adult contemporary – Great Southern Land Media Group
- 94.5 MHz ABC NewsRadio – Rolling news – ABC
- 101.3 MHz Noosa community radio
- 104.9 MHz Sunshine FM – Community radio
- 106.5 MHz 106five Rhema FM – Christian community radio

=== Townsville ===
FM

- 87.6 MHz Classic Gold 87.6 FM – Oldies Narrowcast
- 87.8 MHz Faith FM – Narrowcast
- 88.0 MHz Vision Christian Radio – Narrowcast
- 94.3 MHz ABC News – ABC (News)
- 98.9 MHz KIX Country – Australian Radio Network
- 99.9 MHz Live FM (Christian community)
- 100.7 MHz Power100 – Australian Radio Network
- 101.5 MHz ABC Classic – ABC (Classical Music)
- 102.3 MHz 4TO FM – Southern Cross Austereo
- 103.1 MHz hit103.1 Townsville – Southern Cross Austereo
- 103.9 MHz 4TTT (Community radio)
- 104.7 MHz Radio National – ABC (Information Variety)
- 105.5 MHz triple j – ABC (Alternative)
- 106.3 MHz Star 106.3 – Australian Radio Network
- 107.1 MHz 4K1G (Indigenous community radio)

AM

- 630 kHz ABC Far North – ABC Local Radio (Talk/News/Information)
- 891 kHz Radio TAB (Betting/Racing)

=== Tully ===
- 88.0 MHz Vision Christian Radio – Narrowcast
- 92.7 MHz Vision Christian Radio – Narrowcast
- 90.3 MHz 4ZKZ (Hot FM) – Commercial

AM

- 693 kHz 4KZ – Commercial

=== Wallangarra ===
- 87.6 MHz Vision Christian Radio – Narrowcast

=== Warwick ===
- 87.6 MHz Three Angels Broadcasting Network Australia – Narrowcast
- 87.8 MHz Vision Christian Radio – Narrowcast
- 88.4 MHz [Adventist Radio Australia – Narrowcast]
- 91.9 MHz Cfm

=== Whitsunday ===
- 93.5 MHz Vision Christian Radio – Narrowcast

=== Winton ===
- 87.6 MHz Vision Christian Radio – Narrowcast

=== Woodford ===
- 87.6 MHz Three Angels Broadcasting Network Australia – Narrowcast
- 88.0 MHz Vision Christian Radio – Narrowcast

=== Woongoolba ===
- 87.8 MHz Vision Christian Radio – Narrowcast

=== Yeppoon ===
- 88.0 MHz Vision Christian Radio – Narrowcast
- 91.3 MHz Keppel FM – Community radio
- 96.1 MHz KIX Country – Australian Radio Network

=== Yungaburra ===
- 87.6 MHz Vision Christian Radio – Narrowcast

== South Australia ==
=== Adelaide ===
AM

- 531 kHz Radio 531 Italian Language Radio – 5RTI
- 729 kHz ABC Radio National – ABC
- 891 kHz ABC Radio Adelaide – ABC
- 972 kHz ABC NewsRadio – ABC
- 1197 kHz 5RPH Adelaide – Radio for the Print Handicapped
- 1323 kHz Gold 1323 – ARN Media
- 1395 kHz FIVEaa – Nova Entertainment
- 1539 kHz Radio TAB (Betting/Racing of Radio TAB)
- 1611 kHz Vision Christian Radio – Narrowcast
- 1629 kHz SEN 1116 – Sports Entertainment Network

FM

- 87.6 MHz Radio Italia Uno – Italian language radio
- 87.6 MHz (Aldinga Beach) Vision Christian Radio – Narrowcast
- 87.8 MHz (Willunga) Vision Christian Radio – Narrowcast
- 87.8 MHz (North East Suburbs) Faith FM – Seventh Day Adventist
- 87.8 MHz (Southern Suburbs) Faith FM – Seventh Day Adventist
- 88.0 MHz Easy FM 88, Aberfoyle Park – Country/easy listening
- 88.0 MHz Faith FM – Seventh Day Adventist
- 88.0 MHz (Aldinga Beach) Faith FM – Seventh Day Adventist
- 88.0 MHz (Gawler) Faith FM – Seventh Day Adventist
- 88.0 MHz (Christie Downs) Vision Christian Radio – Narrowcast
- 88.0 MHz (Mount Barker) Vision Christian Radio – Narrowcast
- 88.7 MHz Coast FM – Southern Suburbs
- 89.1 MHz Triple B FM – Barossa Valley
- 89.7 MHz PBA-FM – North Eastern Suburbs
- 91.9 MHz Nova 91.9 – Nova Entertainment
- 92.7 MHz Fresh 92.7 – Urban and Dance Radio for the Youth
- 93.7 MHz Three D Radio – Alternative
- 99.9 MHz 5MBS – (Music Broadcasting Society of SA)
- 100.3 MHz Power FM – Adelaide Hills (Eastern Adelaide)
- 100.5 MHz WOW FM – Western Suburbs
- 101.5 MHz Radio Adelaide – Radio Adelaide
- 102.3 MHz KIIS 102.3 FM – ARN Media
- 103.1 MHz 5EBI – Ethnic Broadcasters Inc
- 103.9 MHz ABC Classic – Classical music
- 104.7 MHz Triple M – Southern Cross Austereo
- 105.5 MHz triple j – ABC (Also at 95.9)
- 106.3 MHz SBS Radio – Special broadcasts
- 107.1 MHz SAFM – Southern Cross Austereo
- 107.9 MHz 1079 Life

DAB+

- Double J
- ABC Country
- ABC Jazz
- ABC Grandstand
- triple j Unearthed
- SBS Chill
- SBS Arabic
- SBS PopAsia
- SBS South Asian
- SBS Radio 1
- SBS Radio 2
- SBS Radio 3, BBC World Service simulcast
- Buddha Hits
- Dance Hits
- Easy 80s Hits
- Oldskool 90s Hits
- Urban Hits
- CW Remix
- EBI DigitalWorld
- The Edge – ARN Media
- IRIS
- 1079 Life
- Mix 102.3 80s – ARN Media
- Mix 102.3 90s – ARN Media
- Triple M Classic Rock Digital – Southern Cross Austereo
- Triple M Hard Rock Digital – Southern Cross Austereo
- Triple M Soft Rock Digital – Southern Cross Austereo
- Triple M 90s Digital – Southern Cross Austereo
- smoothfm – Nova Entertainment
- smooth chill – Nova Entertainment
- Soundcloud Radio

=== Adelaide Hills ===
- 87.6 MHz (Birdwood) Vision Christian Radio – Narrowcast
- 88.0 MHz (Birdwood) Faith FM – Seventh Day Adventist
- 88.9 MHz Lofty 88.9 – Community radio
- 90.3 MHz SAFM – Southern Cross Austereo – Relay of 107.1
- 94.3 MHz 5MU – Australian Radio Network
- 95.1 MHz SBS Radio – SBS – Relay of 106.3
- 95.9 MHz triple j – ABC – Relay of 105.5
- 96.7 MHz KIIS 102.3 – ARN Media – Relay of 102.3
- 97.5 MHz ABC Classic – ABC – Relay of 103.9
- 98.3 MHz Triple M – Southern Cross Austereo – Relay of 104.7
- 99.1 MHz Nova 91.9 – Nova Entertainment – Relay of 91.9
- 99.9 MHz 5MBS – Classical music – Community radio
- 100.3 MHz Power FM (Adelaide Hills) – Australian Radio Network

=== Bordertown ===
- 100.3 MHz Flow FM
- 106.1 MHz 5TCB – Community radio
- 87.6 MHz Faith FM (Christian radio)
- 88.0 MHz Vision Christian Radio – Narrowcast

=== Balaklava ===
FM

- 88.0 MHz Vision Christian Radio – Narrowcast

=== Birdwood ===
FM

- 87.6 MHz Vision Christian Radio – Narrowcast

=== Ceduna ===
FM

- 87.6 MHz Vision Christian Radio – Narrowcast
- 106.1 MHz Flow FM

=== Cleve ===
FM

- 87.8 MHz Vision Christian Radio – Narrowcast
- 99.5 MHz 5CC – Australian Radio Network – Relay of 765 kHz

=== Coober Pedy ===
- 87.6 MHz Vision Christian Radio – Narrowcast
- 98.1 MHz Radio TAB – Betting and racing radio
- 99.7 MHz Flow FM – Commercial radio
- 102.9 MHz CAAMA – Community radio
- 104.5 MHz Dusty Radio – Community radio
- 106.1 MHz ABC North and West SA – ABC
- 107.7 MHz Radio National – ABC

=== Cowell ===
FM

- 87.8 MHz Vision Christian Radio – Narrowcast

=== Elliston ===
FM

- 88.0 MHz Vision Christian Radio – Narrowcast

=== Haslam ===
FM

- 99.0 MHz Vision Christian Radio – Narrowcast

=== Kadina ===
FM

- 88.0 MHz Vision Christian Radio – Narrowcast
- 89.3 MHz Gulf FM

=== Kapunda ===
- 99.5 MHz Flow FM

=== Keith ===
- 104.5 MHz 5TCB – Community radio

=== Kimba ===
FM

- 87.6 MHz Vision Christian Radio – Narrowcast
- 106.9 MHz Flow FM

=== Kingston SE ===
FM

- 87.6 MHz Vision Christian Radio – Narrowcast
- 107.3 MHz Flow FM

=== Laura ===
FM

- 87.6 MHz Vision Christian Radio – Narrowcast

=== Lameroo ===
FM

- 96.5 MHz Flow FM

=== Leigh Creek ===
FM

- 97.7 MHz Flow FM

=== Lock ===
FM

- 88.0 MHz Vision Christian Radio – Narrowcast

=== Loxton ===
FM

- 88.0 MHz Vision Christian Radio – Narrowcast
- 91.5 MHz 5RM – Australian Radio Network – Relay of 801 kHz
- 100.7 MHz Riverland Life FM – Community radio (Christian)

=== Maitland ===
FM

- 90.9 MHz Flow FM

=== Mannum ===
FM

- 87.6 MHz Vision Christian Radio – Narrowcast

=== Medlingle Hill ===
FM

- 88.0 MHz Vision Christian Radio – Narrowcast

=== Meningie ===
FM

- 97.7 MHz Flow FM

=== Millicent ===
FM

- 107.7 5THE FM – Community radiol

=== Minlaton ===
FM

- 87.6 MHz Vision Christian Radio – Narrowcast

=== Minnipa ===
FM

- 88.0 MHz Vision Christian Radio – Narrowcast

=== Moonta ===
FM

- 88.0 MHz Vision Christian Radio – Narrowcast

=== Mount Gambier ===
FM

- 87.6 MHz Faith FM (Christian radio)
- 88.0 MHz Radio TAB (Betting/Racing)
- 90.5 MHz Triple M Limestone Coast – Southern Cross Austereo
- 96.1 MHz SAFM 96.1 Limestone Coast – Southern Cross Austereo
- 100.1 MHz 5GTR FM – Community radio
- 102.5 MHz triple j – ABC
- 103.3 MHz Radio National – ABC
- 104.1 MHz ABC Classic – ABC
- 104.9 MHz Lime FM – Christian Community
- 105.7 MHz ABC NewsRadio – ABC

AM

- 1476 kHz ABC South East SA – ABC
- 1629 kHz SEN SA – Sports Entertainment Network

=== Murray Bridge ===
FM

- 87.6 MHz RiverCity FM – Narrowcast
- 96.3 MHz 5MU – Australian Radio Network
- 98.7 MHz Power FM (Murraylands) – Australian Radio Network

=== Naracoorte ===
- 87.6 MHz Faith FM (Christian radio)
- 88.0 MHz Radio TAB – Racing Radio
- 89.7 MHz 5TCB – Community radio
- 99.3 MHz Lime FM – Christian radio – Relay of 104.9
- 100.9 MHz Star FM – Southern Cross Austereo – Relay of 96.1
- 1161 kHz ABC South East SA – ABC

=== Normanville ===
- 87.6 MHz Radio 876 – Country/Easy listening

=== Orroroo ===
FM

- 88.0 MHz Vision Christian Radio – Narrowcast

=== Paskeville ===
FM

- 88.0 MHz Vision Christian Radio – Narrowcast

=== Peterborough ===
FM

- 91.1 MHz 5PBS – Community radio

=== Pinnaroo ===
FM

- 96.5 MHz Flow FM

=== Poochera ===
FM

- 87.6 MHz Vision Christian Radio – Narrowcast

=== Port Augusta ===
FM

- 88.0 MHz Vision Christian Radio – Narrowcast

=== Port Kenny ===
FM

- 88.0 MHz Vision Christian Radio – Narrowcast

=== Port Lincoln ===
FM

- 87.6 MHz Wild Country – Country music
- 87.8 MHz Vision Christian Radio – Narrowcast
- 89.9 MHz Magic FM – Australian Radio Network
- 92.3 MHz triple j – ABC
- 93.9 MHz 5CC – Australian Radio Network – Relay of 765 kHz
- 107.3 MHz ABC NewsRadio – ABC

AM

- 765 kHz 5CC – Australian Radio Network
- 1485 kHz ABC West Coast SA – ABC

=== Port Pirie ===
FM

- 87.8 MHz Vision Christian Radio – Narrowcast
- 88.0 MHz Radio TAB – Horse racing narrowcast
- 103.5 MHz triple j – ABC
- 105.1 MHz Trax FM – Community radio
- 105.9 MHz Magic FM – Australian Radio Network

AM

- 639 kHz ABC North and West SA – ABC
- 1044 kHz 5CS – Australian Radio Network
- 1629 kHz 5AC 1629am Angel Christian Community Radio – Narrowcast

=== Renmark ===
FM

- 91.5 MHz 5RM - Australian Radio Network
- 93.1 MHz Magic 93.1 – Australian Radio Network
- 93.9 MHz ABC NewsRadio - ABC
- 95.5 MHz TAB Racing Radio
- 100.7 MHz Riverland Life FM
- 101.9 MHz triple j – ABC
- 105.1 MHz ABC Classic – ABC

AM

- 801 kHz 5RM – Australian Radio Network
- 1062 kHz ABC Riverland – ABC
- 1305 kHz ABC Radio National – ABC
- 1557 kHz KIX Country – Australian Radio Network

=== Robe ===
FM

- 107.3 MHz Flow FM

=== Roxby Downs ===
- 95.5 MHz Radio TAB – Betting and Racing Radio
- 96.3 MHz 5AU – Australian Radio Network – Repeater of 1044–1242 Service
- 97.9 MHz Flow FM – Remote Commercial Radio
- 100.3 MHz 105.9 Magic FM – Australian Radio Network
- 101.1 MHz triple j – ABC
- 101.9 MHz Radio National – ABC
- 102.7 MHz ABC North and West SA – ABC
- 103.5 MHz ABC Classic – ABC
- 105.5 MHz Rox FM – Community radio

=== Spencer Gulf ===
- 103.5 MHz triple j – ABC
- 104.3 MHz ABC Classic – ABC
- 105.9 MHz Magic FM – Australian Community Media
- 106.7 MHz Radio National – ABC

=== Smoky Bay ===
FM

- 88.0 MHz Vision Christian Radio – Narrowcast

=== Streaky Bay ===
FM

- 88.0 MHz Vision Christian Radio – Narrowcast
- 99.3 MHz Flow FM

=== Tailem Bend ===
FM

- 88.0 MHz Vision Christian Radio – Narrowcast

=== Two Wells ===
FM

- 87.8 MHz Vision Christian Radio – Narrowcast

=== Virginia ===
FM

- 88.0 MHz Vision Christian Radio – Narrowcast

=== Victor Harbor ===
FM

- 89.3 MHz Fleurieu FM – Community Radio
- 90.1 MHz Happy FM – Community Radio
- 97.1 MHz 5MU – Australian Radio Network
- 99.7 MHz Power FM (Victor Harbor) – Australian Radio Network

=== Waikerie ===
FM

- 88.0 MHz Vision Christian Radio – Narrowcast
- 88.5 MHz Riverland Life FM – Community radio (Christian)
- 89.9 MHz 5RM – Australian Radio Network – Relay of 801 kHz

=== Wallaroo ===
FM

- 87.8 MHz Vision Christian Radio – Narrowcast

=== Whyalla ===
FM

- 87.6 MHz Vision Christian Radio – Narrowcast
- 107.7 Triple Y FM – Community radio

=== Willunga ===
FM

- 91.1 MHz Tribe FM – Community radio

=== Wirrulla ===
FM

- 88.0 MHz Vision Christian Radio – Narrowcast

=== Woomera ===
FM

- 88.0 MHz Vision Christian Radio – Narrowcast
- 101.7 MHz Flow FM
- 103.3 MHz ABC Classic – ABC
- 104.1 MHz triple j – ABC
- 104.9 MHz SBS Radio 1 – SBS
- 105.7 MHz Radio National – ABC
- 107.3 MHz Triple R FM 5RRR – Community radio

AM

- 1584 kHz ABC North and West SA – ABC

=== Yankalilla ===
FM

- 94.7 MHz Fleurieu FM – Community Radio

=== Yorke Peninsula ===
FM

- Gulf FM – 89.3 MHz – Arthurton
- Flow FM – 90.9 MHz – Maitland

== Western Australia ==
=== Perth ===
AM

- 585 kHz ABC News – ABC
- 657 kHz SEN Track – Sports Entertainment Network
- 882 kHz 6PR – Tapt Media
- 990 kHz 990 6RPH Information Radio – Radio Print Handicapped Network
- 1080 kHz 6IX – Capital Radio Network/Grant Broadcasters
- 1116 kHz 6MM – Coast Radio
- 1206 kHz 6TAB – SENTurf – Racing Narrowcast

FM

- 87.6 MHz Vision Christian Radio – Narrowcast
- 87.8 MHz Oz Urban Radio – Urban Music Narrowcast
- 87.8 MHz Magic FM (Easy 87.8) – Jazz Narrowcast
- 88.0 MHz Vision Christian Radio – Narrowcast
- 88.5 MHz VCA FM
- 88.9 MHz KCR 88.9FM – Perth Hills community radio – Kalamunda community radio
- 89.7 MHz Twin Cities FM – Community radio
- 91.3 MHz 91.3 SportFM – Community sporting events
- 91.7 MHz 91.7 WAVE FM – West Coast Radio
- 92.1 MHz RTRFM – Public radio, music and arts community
- 92.9 MHz Triple M 92.9 – Southern Cross Austereo
- 93.7 MHz Nova 93.7 – Nova Entertainment
- 94.5 MHz Mix 94.5 – Southern Cross Austereo
- 95.3 MHz World Radio 6EBAFM – Multicultural community radio
- 96.1 MHz Gold 96FM – ARN Media
- 96.9 MHz SBS Radio – Special Broadcasting Service
- 97.3 MHz 97.3 Coast FM – West Coast Radio
- 97.7 MHz ABC Classic – National ABC
- 98.5 MHz Sonshine – Christian community radio
- 99.3 MHz triple j – ABC
- 100.1 MHz Curtin FM 100.1 – University community radio
- 100.9 MHz Noongar Radio 100.9FM – Indigenous and Various Music
- 101.7 MHz Capital 101.7FM – Capital community radio/seniors community
- 102.5 MHz ABC Radio Perth
- 103.3 MHz [MAC FM] – Macedonian radio station
- 103.3 MHz Radio National
- 104.1 MHz ABC News Radio
- 107.3 MHz Heritage FM – Community radio
- 107.9 MHz Radio Fremantle – Community radio

DAB+ (excludes FM & AM repeats)

- Double J
- ABC Country
- ABC Jazz
- ABC Grandstand
- SBS Chill
- SBS PopAsia
- KIIS DAB+ Perth
- Heart
- Heart Hits
- RnB Fridays
- Blender Beats
- Oldskool 80's Hits
- Oldskool 90's Hits
- Gold 80's
- My Perth Digital – Capital Radio Network
- Hot Country – Grant Broadcasters
- Capital Digital – Capital community radio (Perth) – seniors community
- Sonshine Extra - Christian community radio
- Triple M Classic Rock Digital – Southern Cross Austereo

=== Albany ===
AM

- 630 kHz ABC South Coast – ABC Local Radio
- 783 kHz Triple M – Southern Cross Austereo
- 1611 kHz Gold MX – Barricades Media Pty. Ltd.
- 1629 kHz Rete Italia – Italian Broadcasting

FM

- 87.6 MHz Vision Christian Radio – Narrowcast
- 88.0 MHz 88FlyFM – Barricades Media Pty. Ltd.
- 92.1 MHz ABC News – ABC
- 92.9 MHz triple j – ABC
- 93.7 MHz Vision Christian Radio – Narrowcast
- 94.5 MHz ABC Classic – ABC
- 95.3 MHz HitFM – Southern Cross Austereo
- 96.9 MHz ABC Radio National – ABC
- 100.9 MHz Albany Community Radio
- 104.9 MHz Racing Radio – Racing and Wagering Western Australia
- 106.5 MHz HitFM – Southern Cross Austereo

=== Augusta ===
FM

- 97.1 MHz 2 Oceans FM (Augusta) – Augusta community radio

=== Beverley ===
FM

- 87.6 MHz Vision Christian Radio – Narrowcast

=== Brookton ===
FM

- 88.0 MHz Vision Christian Radio – Narrowcast

=== Broome ===
AM

- 675 kHz ABC Kimberley – ABC

FM

- 87.6 MHz Broome FM – Narrowcast
- 87.8 MHz Vision Christian Radio – Narrowcast
- 91.7 MHz SBS Radio – Special Broadcasting Service
- 93.3 MHz ABC Classic – ABC
- 94.9 MHz triple j – ABC
- 99.7 MHz Radio Goolari – Community radio
- 101.3 MHz Red FM – Redwave Media
- 102.9 MHz The Spirit Network – Redwave Media
- 104.5 MHz Racing Radio – Racing and Wagering Western Australia
- 106.9 MHz ABC NewsRadio – ABC
- 107.7 MHz Radio National – ABC

=== Bunbury ===
AM

- 621 kHz Spirit Radio Network – Sports Entertainment Network
- 684 kHz ABC South West – ABC
- 963 kHz Triple M 6TZ – Southern Cross Austereo
- 1017 kHz Vision Christian Radio – Narrowcast
- 1116 kHz 6MM
- 1152 kHz ABC News
- 1224 kHz Radio National – ABC
- 1629 kHz Three Angels Broadcasting Network Australia

FM

- 93.3 MHz ABC Classic – ABC
- 94.1 MHz triple j – ABC
- 95.7 MHz hit FM – Southern Cross Austereo
- 96.5 MHz Harvey Community radio
- 97.3 MHz Coast FM
- 98.5 MHz Tourist Radio
- 101.3 MHz Collie Community Radio
- 103.7 MHz Bunbury Community Radio

=== Carnarvon ===
AM

- 666 kHz Classic Hits
- 846 kHz ABC Carnarvon

FM

- 87.6 MHz Carnarvon FM
- 99.7 MHz Hot Hits
- 101.3 MHz triple j (repeat of 99.3fm Perth)
- 106.1 MHz ABC News Radio (repeat of 585am Perth)
- 107.7 MHz ABC Radio National

=== Cervantes ===
FM

- 88.0 MHz Vision Christian Radio – Narrowcast
- 99.9 MHz Red FM – Redwave Media

=== Coolgardie ===
FM

- 87.6 MHz Vision Christian Radio – Narrowcast
- 97.9 MHz Hot FM Goldfields

=== Coorow ===
FM

- 88.0 MHz Vision Christian Radio – Narrowcast

=== Corrigin ===
FM

- 88.0 MHz Vision Christian Radio – Narrowcast

=== Cranbrook ===
FM

- 88.0 MHz Vision Christian Radio – Narrowcast

=== Dalwallinu ===
AM

- 531 MHz ABC Radio Dalwallinu

FM

- 88.0 MHz Vision Christian Radio – Narrowcast
- 106.1 MHz Red FM – Redwave Media

=== Denham ===
AM

- 74.7 Red FM – Redwave Media

FM

- 87.6 MHz Vision Christian Radio – Narrowcast
- 105.3 MHz Hot Hits 105

=== Denmark ===
FM

- 88.0 MHz Vision Christian Radio – Narrowcast

=== Derby ===
FM

- 101.1 MHz Vision Christian Radio – Narrowcast

=== Dongara ===
AM

- 828 kHz ABC Midwest & Wheatbelt – ABC
- 1008 kHz Racing Radio – Racing and Wagering Western Australia

FM

- 87.6 MHz Vision Christian Radio – Narrowcast
- 88.6 MHz Racing Radio – Racing and Wagering Western Australia
- 94.9 MHz ABC Classic – ABC
- 96.5 MHz Red FM – Redwave Media
- 98.1 MHz Spirit Radio Network – Redwave Media
- 98.9 MHz triple j – ABC
- 99.7 MHz ABC Radio National – ABC
- 100.5 MHz Midwest Aboriginal Media Association
- 101.3 MHz ABC News

=== Dwellingup ===
FM

- 88.0 MHz Vision Christian Radio – Narrowcast
- 97.3 MHz Coast FM

=== Esperance ===
FM

- 88.0 MHz Vision Christian Radio – Narrowcast
- 102.3 MHz Hot FM

=== Fitzroy Crossing ===
AM

- 936 AM Wangki Yupurnanupurru Radio – Community Radio

FM

- 88.0 MHz Vision Christian Radio – Narrowcast

=== Geraldton ===
AM

- 828 kHz ABC Midwest & Wheatbelt – ABC
- 1008 kHz Racing Radio – Racing and Wagering Western Australia

FM

- 88.6 MHz Racing Radio – Racing and Wagering Western Australia
- 94.9 MHz ABC Classic – ABC
- 96.5 MHz Red FM – Redwave Media
- 98.1 MHz The Spirit Network – Redwave Media
- 98.9 MHz triple j – ABC
- 99.7 MHz ABC Radio National – ABC
- 100.5 MHz Midwest Aboriginal Media Association
- 101.3 MHz ABC News

=== Gnowangerup ===
FM

- 88.0 MHz Vision Christian Radio – Narrowcast

=== Green Head ===
FM

- 88.0 MHz Vision Christian Radio – Narrowcast

=== Halls Creek ===
FM

- 101.3 MHz Vision Christian Radio – Narrowcast

=== Hyden ===
FM

- 88.0 MHz Vision Christian Radio – Narrowcast

=== Jurien Bay ===
FM

- 88.0 MHz Vision Christian Radio – Narrowcast
- 103.1 MHz Red FM – Redwave Media
- 104.7 MHz Spirit Radio Network – Redwave Media

=== Kalgoorlie ===
AM

- 648 kHz ABC Goldfields – ABC
- 981 kHz Triple M (formerly RadioWest 6 kg)
- 1413 kHz Vision Christian Radio – Narrowcast

FM

- 87.6 MHz Vision Christian Radio – Narrowcast
- 88.0 MHz Racing Radio – Racing and Wagering Western Australia
- 95.5 MHz ABC Classic – ABC
- 96.3 MHz CAAMA Radio – Central Australian Aboriginal Media Association
- 97.1 MHz Radio National – ABC
- 97.9 MHz HOT FM – Southern Cross Austereo
- 98.7 MHz Triple J – ABC
- 100.3 MHz ABC News – ABC

=== Katanning ===
FM

- 87.6 MHz Vision Christian Radio – Narrowcast
- 94.9 MHz Hot FM – Southern Cross Austereo
- 97.3 MHz Sonshine – Christian community radio

=== Kojonup ===
FM

- 88.0 MHz Vision Christian Radio – Narrowcast

=== Kondinin ===
FM

- 88.0 MHz Vision Christian Radio – Narrowcast
- 92.3 MHz Red FM – Redwave Media

=== Kulin ===
FM

- 88.0 MHz Vision Christian Radio – Narrowcast

=== Lake Grace ===
FM

- 88.0 MHz Vision Christian Radio – Narrowcast

=== Lancelin ===
FM

- 88.0 MHz Vision Christian Radio – Narrowcast
- 102.3 MHz Red FM Lancelin
- 103.9 MHz Spirit Lancelin

=== Leeman ===
FM

- 88.0 MHz Vision Christian Radio – Narrowcast
- 103.7 MHz Spirit Radio Network – Redwave Media

=== Leonora ===
FM

- 98.5 MHz Vision Christian Radio – Narrowcast

=== Margaret River ===
AM

- 1611 kHz Vision Christian Radio – Narrowcast

FM

- 100.3 MHz Hot FM – Southern Cross Austereo

=== Marble Bar ===
FM

- 88.0 MHz Vision Christian Radio – Narrowcast

=== Mandurah ===
FM

- 91.7 MHz 91.7 THE WAVE FM – West Coast Radio
- 97.3 MHz 97.3 Coast FM 97.3 Coast FM– West Coast Radio

=== Meekatharra ===
FM

- 87.6 MHz Vision Christian Radio – Narrowcast
- 98.3 MHz Meeka FM – Community Radio
- 101.5 MHz Triple M – Southern Cross Austereo
- 103.1 MHz Hit FM – Southern Cross Austereo

=== Merredin ===
FM

- 88.0 MHz Vision Christian Radio – Narrowcast
- 105.1 MHz Hit FM – Southern Cross Austereo

AM

- 1098 kHz Triple M – Southern Cross Austereo

=== Moora ===
FM

- 87.6 MHz Vision Christian Radio – Narrowcast
- 90.9 MHz Red FM – Redwave Media

=== Mount Barker ===
FM

- 93.7 MHz Vision Christian Radio – Narrowcast
- 95.3 MHz HOT FM
- 106.5 MHz HOT FM

=== Mount Magnet ===
FM

- 88.0 MHz Vision Christian Radio – Narrowcast
- 102.5 MHz Red FM – Redwave Media

=== Mukinbudin ===
FM

- 88.0 MHz Vision Christian Radio – Narrowcast

=== Mullewa ===
FM

- 88.0 MHz Vision Christian Radio – Narrowcast

=== Narembeen ===
FM

- 88.0 MHz Vision Christian Radio – Narrowcast

=== Narrogin ===
AM

- 558 kHz ABC Great Southern – ABC Local Radio
- 918 kHz RadioWest – Southern Cross Austereo
- 1296 kHz Radio National – ABC
- 1422–1611 kHz 6GS – Narrowcast

FM

- 87.6 MHz Vision Christian Radio – Narrowcast
- 92.5 MHz ABC Classic – ABC
- 96.3 MHz ABC News – ABC
- 98.1 MHz triple j – ABC
- 100.5 MHz Hot FM – Southern Cross Austereo

=== Newdegate ===
FM

- 88.0 MHz Vision Christian Radio – Narrowcast

=== Newman ===
FM

- 87.6 MHz Vision Christian Radio – Narrowcast
- 90.5 MHz Red FM – Redwave Media
- 92.9 MHz 6NEW – Newman Community Radio

=== Norseman ===
FM

- 88.0 MHz Vision Christian Radio – Narrowcast

=== Northam ===
AM

- 864 kHz Triple M formerly RadioWest – Southern Cross Austereo (Callsign 6AM)
- 1215 kHz ABC Central Wheatbelt – ABC

FM

- 87.6 MHz Vision Christian Radio – Narrowcast
- 96.5 MHz Hot FM – Southern Cross Austereo
- 98.1 MHz triple j – ABC
- 98.9 MHz ABC Classic – ABC
- 99.7 MHz ABC News – ABC
- 101.3 MHz York FM

=== Northampton ===
FM

- 87.6 MHz Vision Christian Radio – Narrowcast
- 96.5 MHz Red FM – Redwave Media
- 98.1 MHz Spirit Radio Network – Redwave Media

=== Onslow ===
FM

- 100.3 MHz Hot Hits 99.7 relay
- 101.9 MHz Vision Christian Radio – Narrowcast

=== Paraburdoo ===
FM

- 98.1 MHz Vision Christian Radio – Narrowcast

=== Pingelly ===
FM

- 88.0 MHz Vision Christian Radio – Narrowcast

=== Quairading ===
FM

- 88.0 MHz Vision Christian Radio – Narrowcast

=== Ravensthorpe ===
FM

- 88.0 MHz Vision Christian Radio – Narrowcast

=== Roebourne ===
FM

- 97.7 MHz Vision Christian Radio – Narrowcast

=== Southern Cross ===
FM

- 88.0 MHz Vision Christian Radio – Narrowcast

=== Tambellup ===
FM

- 88.0 MHz Vision Christian Radio – Narrowcast

=== Tom Price ===
FM

- 100.9 MHz JJJ
- 102.5 MHz ABC RR
- 105.7 MHz Spirit FM
- 106.5 MHz Gumala Radio
- 104.1 MHz Vision Christian Radio – Narrowcast

=== Toodyay ===
FM

- 88.0 MHz Vision Christian Radio – Narrowcast
- 105.3 MHz Toodyay Community Radio – Local community radio

=== Trayning ===
FM

- 88.0 MHz Vision Christian Radio – Narrowcast

=== Useless Loop ===
FM

- 100.3 MHz ABC Local Radio
- 102.7 MHz triple j

=== Wagin ===
AM

- 558 kHz ABC Local Radio Great Southern – ABC
- 1422 kHz Radio Great Southern – Radio Great Southern
- 1611 kHz Easy Listening – Radio Great Southern

FM

- 87.6 MHz Vision Christian Radio – Narrowcast

=== Walpole ===
FM

- 88.0 MHz Vision Christian Radio – Narrowcast

=== Wickepin ===
FM

- 88.0 MHz Vision Christian Radio – Narrowcast

=== Wiluna ===
FM

- 87.6 MHz Vision Christian Radio – Narrowcast

=== Wongan Hills ===
FM

- 88.0 MHz Vision Christian Radio – Narrowcast

=== Wyndham ===
FM

- 88.0 MHz Vision Christian Radio – Narrowcast

=== York ===
FM

- 87.6 MHz Vision Christian Radio – Narrowcast

== Tasmania ==
=== Hobart ===
AM

- 585 kHz Radio National – ABC
- 747 kHz ABC News – ABC
- 864 kHz 7RPH – Radio Print Handicapped Network
- 936 kHz ABC Radio Hobart – ABC
- 1080 kHz TOTE Sport Radio – Racing radio
- 1620 kHz NTC Radio Australia

FM

- 88.0 MHz Vision Christian Radio – Narrowcast
- 92.9 MHz triple j – ABC
- 93.9 MHz ABC Classic – ABC
- 96.1 MHz Hobart FM (7THE) – Community radio (also translated on 92.1 MHz for areas south of Hobart)
- 99.3 MHz Edge Radio – Community radio
- 100.9 MHz Hit 100.9 – Southern Cross Austereo
- 101.7 MHz 7HOFM – Australian Radio Network
- 105.7 MHz SBS Radio – Multilingual
- 106.5 MHz Ultra106five – Christian radio
- 107.3 MHz Triple M Hobart – Southern Cross Austereo

DAB+

- ABC Radio Hobart
- ABC Classic
- Double J
- ABC Jazz
- ABC Country
- ABC KIDS listen
- ABC Grandstand
- ABC News Radio
- ABC Radio National
- SBS Chill
- SBS Radio 1
- SBS Radio 2
- SBS Radio 3
- SBS Arabic
- SBS PopAsia
- SBS South Asian
- triple j
- triple j Unearthed
- 107.3 Triple M
- Hit 100.9
- 7HOFM
- KIX Country

=== Bagdad ===
FM

- 88.0 MHz Vision Christian Radio – Narrowcast

=== Bicheno ===
FM

- 88.0 MHz Vision Christian Radio – Narrowcast
- 89.7 MHz ABC Northern Tasmania – ABC Local Radio
- 91.3 MHz Radio National – ABC
- 98.5 MHz Star FM – Community Radio

=== Bridgewater ===
FM

- 88.0 MHz Vision Christian Radio – Narrowcast

=== Burnie ===
FM

- 87.6 MHz Vision Christian Radio – Narrowcast
- 90.5 MHz ABC News – ABC
- 97.7 MHz TOTE Sport Radio – Racing Radio
- 100.9 MHz 7BU – Australian Radio Network
- 101.7 MHz Sea FM – Australian Radio Network
- 102.5 MHz ABC Northern Tasmania – ABC
- 106.1 MHz Coast FM Tasmania – Community radio

=== Campbell Town ===
FM

- 88.0 MHz Vision Christian Radio – Narrowcast

=== Currie/King Island ===
==== FM ====
- 88.5 MHz ABC Northern Tasmania – ABC
- 97.3 MHz ABC Classic – ABC - Self-Help Retransmission
- 98.1 MHz triple j – ABC - Self-Help Retransmission
- 98.9 MHz Radio National – ABC - Self-Help Retransmission
- 99.7 MHz ABC Northern Tasmania – ABC - Self-Help Retransmission
- 100.5 MHz King Island Radio - Community

=== Devonport ===
FM

- 98.9 MHz 7AD – Australian Radio Network
- 100.5 MHz ABC Northern Tasmania – ABC
- 101.3 MHz TOTE Sport Radio – Racing radio
- 104.7 MHz Coast FM Tasmania – Community radio
- 107.7 MHz Sea FM – Australian Radio Network

=== Fingal ===
FM

- 88.0 MHz Vision Christian Radio – Narrowcast

AM

- 1161 kHz ABC Northern Tasmania – ABC

=== Geeveston ===
FM

- 88.0 MHz Vision Christian Radio – Narrowcast

=== Huon Valley ===
- 98.5 MHz Huon FM Website – Community radio – (Geeveston) 95.3 MHz
- 87.8 MHz Pulse FM Kingborough and Huon – Youth Narrowcast Radio

=== Huonville ===
FM

- 88.0 MHz Vision Christian Radio – Narrowcast

=== Kettering ===
FM

- 88.0 MHz Vision Christian Radio – Narrowcast

=== Kingston ===
FM

- 88.0 MHz Vision Christian Radio – Narrowcast

=== Latrobe ===
FM

- 87.6 MHz Vision Christian Radio – Narrowcast

=== Lauderdale ===
FM

- 87.6 MHz Vision Christian Radio – Narrowcast

=== Launceston ===
FM

- 89.3 MHz LAFM (7LA) – Australian Radio Network
- 90.1 MHz Chilli FM (7EX) – Australian Radio Network
- 90.9 MHz triple j – ABC
- 91.7 MHz ABC Northern Tasmania – ABC
- 92.5 MHz ABC News – ABC
- 93.3 MHz ABC Classic – ABC
- 94.1 MHz Radio National – ABC
- 103.7 MHz & 96.5 MHz City Park Radio – Community radio
- 104.5 MHz SBS Radio 1 – SBS
- 105.3 MHz Way FM – Christian radio
- 106.9 MHz 7RPH – Relay of 864 from Hobart

AM

- 1008 kHz TOTE Sport Radio – Racing Radio

=== Longford ===
FM

- 87.6 MHz Vision Christian Radio – Narrowcast

=== Midway Point ===
FM

- 87.6 MHz Vision Christian Radio – Narrowcast

=== New Norfolk ===
FM

- 87.6 MHz Faith FM – Christian radio
- 88.0 MHz Vision Christian Radio – Narrowcast

=== Orford ===
FM

- 87.6 MHz Vision Christian Radio – Narrowcast

=== Penguin ===
FM

- 87.6 MHz Vision Christian Radio – Narrowcast
- 106.1 MHz Coast FM Tasmania – Community radio

=== Perth ===
FM

- 87.8 MHz Vision Christian Radio – Narrowcast

=== Queenstown ===
FM

- 88.0 MHz Vision Christian Radio – Narrowcast
- 88.9 MHz triple j – ABC
- 90.5 MHz ABC Northern Tasmania – ABC
- 92.1 MHz 7XS – Australian Radio Network
- 95.3 MHz KIX Country – Australian Radio Network

AM

- 630 kHz Radio National – ABC

=== Richmond ===
FM

- 88.0 MHz Vision Christian Radio – Narrowcast

=== Rosebery ===
- 102.7 MHz triple j – ABC
- 106.3 MHz ABC Northern Tasmania – ABC
- 107.1 MHz 7XS – Relay of 837 kHz from Queenstown – Australian Radio Network
- 107.9 MHz Radio National – ABC

=== Scottsdale ===
FM

- 88.0 MHz Vision Christian Radio – Narrowcast
- 95.7 MHz 7SD – Australian Radio Network
- 99.7 MHz Chilli FM – Australian Radio Network

AM

- 540 kHz 7SD – Australian Radio Network

=== Shearwater ===
FM

- 87.6 MHz Vision Christian Radio – Narrowcast

=== Sheffield ===
FM

- 87.6 MHz Vision Christian Radio – Narrowcast

=== Smithton ===
- 94.5 MHz 7BU – Relay of 558 kHz from Burnie – Australian Radio Network
- 88.9 MHz Coast FM Tasmania – Community radio
- 105.5 MHz triple j – ABC

=== Somerset ===
FM

- 87.6 MHz Vision Christian Radio – Narrowcast

=== Sorell ===
FM

- 88.0 MHz Vision Christian Radio – Narrowcast

=== Strahan ===
- 88.0 MHz Vision Christian Radio – Narrowcast
- 101.9 MHz triple j – ABC
- 105.1 MHz 7XS – Relay of 837 kHz from Queenstown
- 105.9 MHz Radio National – ABC
- 107.5 MHz ABC Northern Tasmania – ABC Local Radio

=== St Helens ===
FM

- 88.0 MHz Vision Christian Radio – Narrowcast
- 90.5 MHz Chilli FM – Australian Radio Network
- 92.1 MHz 7SD – Australian Radio Network
- 93.7 MHz Star FM – Community Radio
- 96.1 MHz Radio National – ABC

AM

- 1584 kHz ABC Northern Tasmania – ABC Local Radio

=== St Leonards ===
FM

- 88.0 MHz Vision Christian Radio – Narrowcast

=== St Marys ===
FM

- 88.0 MHz Vision Christian Radio – Narrowcast
- 100.3 MHz Star FM – Community Radio
- 101.1 MHz Radio National – ABC
- 102.7 MHz ABC Northern Tasmania – ABC Local Radio
- 103.5 MHz Chilli FM – Australian Radio Network
- 105.1 MHz 7SD – Australian Radio Network

=== Triabunna ===
FM

- 88.0 MHz Vision Christian Radio – Narrowcast
- 88.9 MHz Radio National – ABC
- 90.5 MHz ABC Radio Hobart – ABC Local Radio

=== Tunbridge ===
FM

- 88.0 MHz Vision Christian Radio – Narrowcast

=== Ulverstone ===
FM

- 87.6 MHz Vision Christian Radio – Narrowcast
- 106.1 MHz Coast FM Tasmania – Community radio

=== Wynyard ===
FM

- 106.1 MHz Coast FM Tasmania – Community radio

=== Zeehan ===
FM

- 88.0 MHz Vision Christian Radio – Narrowcast

== Northern Territory ==
=== Darwin ===
FM

- 91.5 MHz Darwin FM – Narrowcast
- 92.3 MHz Top Country – Narrowcast
- 94.5 MHz First Nations Radio – Community radio
- 97.7 MHz Rhema FM 97.7 – Christian radio
- 100.1 MHz Hot 100 – Australian Radio Network
- 100.9 MHz SBS Radio – SBS
- 102.5 MHz ABC News – ABC
- 103.3 MHz triple j – ABC
- 104.1 MHz 104.1 Territory FM – Community radio
- 104.9 MHz Mix 104.9 – Australian Radio Network
- 105.7 MHz ABC Radio Darwin – ABC
- 107.3 MHz ABC Classic – ABC

AM

- 657 kHz Radio National – ABC
- 1242 kHz RadioTAB (Betting/Racing) – Relay Radio TAB – Brisbane
- 1530 kHz Yolngu Radio – Aboriginal community radio
- 1611 kHz Rete Italia – Italian Radio

=== Alice Springs ===
FM

- 88.0 MHz Vision Christian Radio – Narrowcast
- 94.9 MHz triple j – ABC
- 95.9 MHz RadioTAB (Betting/Racing) – Relay Radio TAB – Brisbane
- 96.9 MHz Sun FM – Sun FM
- 97.9 MHz ABC Classic – ABC
- 98.7 MHz Tourist Gold FM
- 99.7 MHz Radio National – ABC
- 100.5 MHz CAAMA – Aboriginal community radio
- 102.1 MHz 8CCC – Community radio
- 104.1 MHz ABC News

AM

- 783 kHz ABC Alice Springs – ABC
- 900 kHz 8HA

=== Alyangula ===
FM

- 88.0 MHz Vision Christian Radio – Narrowcast

=== Borroloola ===
FM

- 88.0 MHz Vision Christian Radio – Narrowcast

=== Elcho Island ===
FM

- 88.0 MHz Vision Christian Radio – Narrowcast

=== Gapuwiyak ===
FM

- 88.0 MHz Vision Christian Radio – Narrowcast

=== Katherine ===
FM

- 87.6 MHz Faith FM – Narrowcast
- 88.0 MHz KatCountry88 – Narrowcast
- 94.9 MHz ABC Classic
- 98.1 MHz Hot FM
- 99.7 MHz Triple J – ABC
- 101.3 MHz 8KTR – Community radio
- 102.5 MHz Vision Christian Radio
- 103.7 MHz Radio TAB
- 104.5 MHz CAAMA
- 105.3 MHz ABC News Radio
- 106.1 MHz ABC Katherine
- 106.9 MHz Mix FM

AM

- 639 kHz ABC Radio National

=== Lajamanu ===
FM

- 88.0 MHz Vision Christian Radio – Narrowcast

=== Milingimbi Island ===
FM

- 88.0 MHz Vision Christian Radio – Narrowcast

=== Nhulunbuy ===
FM

- 88.0 MHz Vision Christian Radio – Narrowcast

=== Numbulwar ===
FM

- 88.0 MHz Vision Christian Radio – Narrowcast

=== Ramingining ===
FM

- 88.0 MHz Vision Christian Radio – Narrowcast

=== Tennant Creek ===
FM

- 102.1 MHz 8CCC – Community radio
- 104.5 MHz Vision Christian Radio – Narrowcast

=== Yirrkala ===
FM

- 88.0 MHz Vision Christian Radio – Narrowcast

=== Yulara ===
FM

- 88.0 MHz Vision Christian Radio – Narrowcast
- 95.7 MHz triple j – ABC
- 97.3 MHz Radio TAB (Betting/Racing) – Relay Radio TAB – Brisbane
- 98.1 MHz Radio National – ABC
- 98.9 MHz ABC Classic – ABC
- 99.7 MHz ABC Local Radio – Australian Broadcasting Corporation
- 100.5 MHz 8HA – Relay of 900 kHz
- 102.1 MHz CAAMA – Aboriginal community radio
- 105.3 MHz Tourist Gold FM

== Norfolk Island ==
- 87.6 MHz Whiskey Tango Foxtrot – Bounty Museum
- 89.9 MHz Radio Norfolk 89.9FM – Community

== Lord Howe Island ==
- 100.1 MHz Lord Howe Island Radio – Community

== Cocos (Keeling) Islands ==
- 96.0 MHz [[Voice of the Cocos [Keeling] Islands 6CKI]] – Community

== Christmas Island ==
- 102.1 MHz Radio Christmas Island – Community
- 105.3 MHz Radio Christmas Island – Community

== Networks ==
- Ace Radio
- Australian Broadcasting Corporation
  - ABC Local Radio
  - ABC NewsRadio
  - Radio National
  - ABC Classic
  - triple j
- Australian Radio Network
  - KIIS Network
  - Pure Gold Network
- ARN Regional
- Broadcast Operations Group
- Capital Radio Network
- Sports Talk
- Faith FM
- Nova Entertainment
  - Nova FM
  - smoothfm
- Grant Broadcasters
- Southern Cross Austereo
  - Hit Network
  - Triple M
    - RadioWest
- Radio Print Handicapped Network
- RawFM Radio Network
- Special Broadcasting Service
  - SBS Radio 1
  - SBS Radio 2
  - SBS National
- Sky Racing
- Sports Entertainment Network
- Super Network
- Tapt Media
- Three Angels Broadcasting Network
- Victorian Racing Committee
- Vision Christian Radio

== See also ==
- List of Australian television channels
- List of ABC radio stations
- List of Australian AM radio stations
- Timeline of Australian radio
- History of broadcasting
- History of broadcasting in Australia
- Community radio
- Christian radio
