= Radio 97 =

Radio 97 (2MW)
- Murwillumbah, New South Wales; Australia
- Broadcast area: Murwillumbah/Tweed Heads/Gold Coast
- Frequency: 972 kHz AM
- Branding: Radio 97

Programming
- Language: English
- Affiliations: Super Radio Network

Ownership
- Owner: Broadcast Operations Group; (Tweed Radio & Broadcasting Co Pty Ltd)

History
- First air date: 2 September 1936

Technical information
- Licensing authority: ACMA
- Power: 5 kW
- Transmitter coordinates: 28°19′39″S 153°30′29″E
- Repeaters: 103.5 MHz FM; Mullumbimby; 104.1 MHz FM; Currumbin

Links
- Public licence information: Profile
- Webcast: www.radio97.com.au/radio97.com.au/listen.html
- Website: radio97.com.au

2MW, better known as Radio 97, is an Australian radio station serving the Murwillumbah region. Its first broadcast was on 2 September 1937.

== History ==
The commercial radio license for the station was first granted to AA Budd, AC Pratt, FE Nicholl as directors of the station and JA Small as the secretary. They incorporated on 30 November 1936 and sought other shareholders within the community.

The official opening took place on the evening of 2 September 1937 and formalities were performed by Eric Spooner who was the then Minister for Works and Local Government.

AA Budd, who had become the chairman of the station, said at the opening of the station that:

[It is] our earnest ambition is to provide a service that will be of material benefit to all sections of the community. I feel very confident that this station, which I may say is your station, will prove to be not only a most useful commercial medium, but will be valued greatest because of the part it will play in the advancement of education and knowledge of affairs, the musical art, social intercourse, sport, and all those things which go to make the lives of people more useful and happier.

— AA Budd, via The Tweed Daily, 3 September 1937

Initially the station broadcast for a few hours each day but was soon operating 24 hours a day. Early shows hosted on the station were: Tong’s Hilbilly Harmonies, These Old Shades and Swap Shop. Tong’s Hilbilly Harmonies was hosted/sponsored by Thomas Tong See and his family, who had moved to Murwillumbah in 1935 and operated a general store. It played country music at 8:00am every Thursday and Friday morning throughout the 1950s.

In 1986 the station was sold to Northern Star Holdings and later to Hoyts and then, around 1987, to the Broadcast Operations Group.

== Controversy ==
In 1996 the Australian Broadcasting Association received a complaints about comments made on Australia Tonight by Steve Schimanski. It alleged that Schimanski had made homophobic comments that breached the Commercial Radio Code of Practice and, as a result of their investigation, his employment was terminated.
