= John Laws Morning Show =

- Genre: Talkback
- Country of origin: Australia
- Language: English
- Home station: 2SM
- Hosted by: John Laws
- Website: http://2smsupernetwork.com/john-laws/

The John Laws Morning Show was an Australian weekday talk show on 2SM and the Super Radio Network. It was hosted by radio personality John Laws. The show is in talk radio format where callers discuss news, current affairs, politics and occasionally random topics. Laws also plays music of various genres including country.

Some of his most played songs include ‘El Presidente’ which opens the show, ‘Keeping The Dream Alive’ by Freiheit, which is the backing music to Laws’ introductory commentary, ‘Go West’ by Pet Shop Boys and in 2020 has regularly played ‘We’re Not Gonna Take It’ by Twisted Sister.

== History ==
After announcing his retirement from commercial radio in June 2007 and broadcasting his final show on Friday 30 November that year, Laws announced his desire to return to talkback in August 2009.

From early 2011 Laws hosted the John Laws Morning Show weekdays from 9am to 12pm, across the Super Radio Network.

Laws announced his second retirement in Late 2024. The show finished up on Friday, December 8th.

The show was paneled by Jordan Bocock.

== Controversy ==
Due to his strong opinions (especially political views) Laws has been criticised for viewpoints he has expressed on the show. Due to the political nature of the show, it regularly interviews people from all sides of politics including controversial politicians such as Pauline Hanson, leader of right-wing party One Nation. Another feature of the show is that Laws allows callers to express their viewpoint without much interruption, sometimes to allow callers to unwittingly mock themselves (for example: long term unemployed people trying to explain why they are not working) and sometimes allowing politically extreme opinions on his show.
