= Max 107.3 =

Pop music radio station in Taree, New South Wales

Max 1073
- Australia
- Broadcast area: Mid North Coast, New South Wales
- Frequency: 107.3 MHz FM
- Branding: Livin' Life To The Max!

Programming
- Language: English
- Format: Hot adult contemporary

Ownership
- Owner: Broadcast Operations Group; (Manning Valley Max The Heat Pty. Ltd.)
- Sister stations: 2RE

History
- First air date: 29 January 1997
- Call sign meaning: 2 - New South Wales; Manning Valley Broadcasters

Technical information
- ERP: 10 kW
- Translator: 103.3 MHz FM Gloucester

Links
- Website: www.max1073.com.au

Max 107.3 is an Australian commercial radio station broadcasting to the Mid North Coast of New South Wales. Owned and operated by Broadcast Operations Group, the station broadcasts a hot adult contemporary music format with local breakfast and afternoon shows based from studios in Taree.

== History ==
The station was first launched on 29 January 1997 as Max FM. The first song played on the station was "Good Times" by INXS & Jimmy Barnes. Under the ownership of Broadcast Operations Group, the station broadcasts a variety of local and networked programming, from network hubs based in Newcastle and Tweed Heads.

Max 107.3 broadcasts on 107.3FM across the Mid North Coast of New South Wales, ranging from Port Macquarie in the north through to Bulahdelah in the south. The station competes with sister station 2RE, as well as hit102.3, Radio 531 and Triple M from Port Macquarie.

In September 2018, the station relaunched as Max 107.3, transitioning to a hot adult contemporary music format in line with its sister stations, including New FM Newcastle. Previously, the station broadcast a contemporary hit radio format during local hours.

== Transmitters ==
Max 107.3 is broadcast via one full power station, and one repeater station.

Frequency	Broadcast area	ERP W	Transmitter coordinates	Notes
107.3 FM	Taree, New South Wales	10,000	31°55′20″S 152°10′54″E	
103.3 FM	Gloucester, New South Wales	80	31°57′45″S 151°56′48″E	
