= Where The Action Is (Australia) =

Where The Action Is was an Australian television show that aired from January to November 1966. It starred Johnny O'Keefe and was produced by the newly launched TEN Network. The concept revolved around O'Keefe traveling to locations around Sydney, and later in the show's run, around Australia. Each episode would feature guest stars that would sing many of their current hits.

The show marked O'Keefe's return to Australian television following the cancellation of his previous show Sing, Sing, Sing in 1965. A combination of O'Keefe's waning popularity, budget constraints, and technical limitations at the new station meant the show was unsuccessful and was cancelled within the same year it commenced. It was the last television series to be hosted by O'Keefe. Only two episodes are known to still exist.
