= 2GF =

Radio station in Grafton, Australia

2GF 89.5 (2GF)
- Grafton, New South Wales; Australia
- Broadcast area: Grafton RA2
- Frequency: FM: 89.5 MHz
- Branding: The Home of News, Sport, and Talk

Programming
- Format: Talk radio, classic hits
- Network: Super Radio Network

Ownership
- Owner: Broadcast Operations Group
- Operator: Super Radio Network
- Sister stations: FM104.7

History
- First air date: 15 December 1933; 92 years ago
- Former frequencies: 1206 Khz, 103.9 Mhz
- Call sign meaning: 2 for New South Wales plus GF for Grafton

Technical information
- Licensing authority: ACMA
- ERP: 40,000 watts
- Transmitter coordinates: 29.489325°S 153.171289°E

Links
- Public licence information: Profile
- Website: 2gf.au

2GF is an Australian radio station based in Grafton, New South Wales operated by Broadcast Operations Group (Super Radio Network). It was opened at 8pm on 15 December 1933 by Postmaster-General Archdale Parkhill.

Until 28 November 2022, the station broadcast on 1206 AM and on FM 103.9 to the Northern Rivers region of Grafton, Maclean, and Yamba. On 28 November 2022, 2GF commenced broadcasting to the Grafton RA1 licence area on a new frequency on FM 89.5 after being granted a licence to fully convert to the FM band by the Australian Communications and Media Authority. 2GF ceased to broadcast on 1206AM on 23 December 2022.

Notable former presenters include Ron Bell, Jill Lipman, and Richie Williamson.

== Current shows ==
Most programmes on 2GF are from other SRN stations such as 2SM and 2HD. Current shows include:

- The Breakfast Club with Misty (6-9am weekdays)
- Mornings with Chris Smith (Weekdays 9-12pm)
- David Wright “The Right Guy” (Drive home from 3-6pm)
- Nightline with Cheralyn Darcey (8pm-12am weeknights)
