= Ocasek =

Ocasek is a surname. Notable people with the surname include:

- Oliver Ocasek (1925–1999), American politician of the Democratic party
- Ric Ocasek (1944–2019), American musician and music producer, leading band member of The Cars
  - Christopher Otcasek, American singer, son of Ric Ocasek
