= Nootumbulla Creek =

Stream in Far Western, New South Wales, Australia

Coordinates: 31°14′S 142°12′E

Nootumbulla Creek is a stream in in Far Western, New South Wales. Nootumbulla Creek is a stream and is nearby to Shell Hill, Byngnano Range and Mount Yerralany.

Nootumbulla Creek starts below Shell Hill at an elevation of 264m drops around 63.4m over its 4.93 km length finishing at an elevation of 200m .

The Nootumbulla Creek is at Latitude: -31.229134 Longitude: 142.207397 Nootumbulla area is almost unpopulated, with less than two inhabitants per square kilometre, and has a Köppen climate classification of BWh (Hot desert).
