= 2RE =

Coordinates: 31.925323°S 152.465510°E

- Taree, New South Wales, Australia; Australia
- Frequencies: 1557 kHz; 88.9 MHz; 100.3 MHz; 100.1 MHz

Programming
- Affiliations: Super Radio Network

Ownership
- Owner: Manning Valley Max The Heat Pty Ltd
- Sister stations: Max FM

History
- First air date: 1953
- Call sign meaning: 2 – New South Wales founder Reginald Eagling

Technical information

Links
- Website: http://www.2RE.com.au

2RE is a commercial radio station that broadcasts to the Mid North Coast of New South Wales, Australia from its studios at Taree.

2RE broadcasts on 88.9FM in Taree, Wingham and surrounds, 100.3FM in Forster and the Great Lakes and 100.1FM in Gloucester, Barrington and surrounds.

Local shows include the Breakfast Show with Anthony Zanos, afternoons and drive with Kevin Rayment and Diane Ward. 2RE features a 'Gold/AC' format mixed with local news from Peter Denton, sport and talk. The overnight shows are relayed from 2SM and 2HD.

2RE began broadcasting on 21 February 1953 from a small studio attached to the Taree RSL on the riverbank. Today 2RE has a modern studio complex in Taree and is part of the Super Radio Network, which has its head office at 2SM in Sydney.

To mark the 50th anniversary of the first broadcast a reunion of former staff was organised for 21–22 February 2003. Many former employees returned and reminisced about their days at 2RE. As part of the celebrations there was also an open day where listeners were invited to tour the radio station. A time capsule was placed in the front of the building, a special commemorative book written by Jenny Summerville and the major prize of the year—a 1953 FJ Holden—was unveiled in its 'ready for restoration state'. Ivan Scott won most popular station manager (Country Stations) at the ACRA awards Murray Nelson is the current General Manager.

2RE is most well known for playing music from the 1970s to recent hits both in breakfast as well as afternoon and drive shifts, along with networked talkback radio.

In late 2024 the tall AM transmitting mast at Glenthorne just south of the Manning River was dismantled.
