= Johnny O'Keefe =

Australian rock and roll singer (1935–1978)

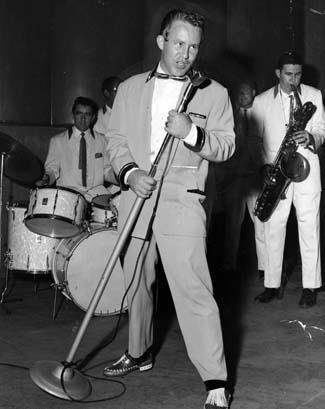
- O'Keefe performing in 1962

Background information
- Also known as: J.O'K., The Wild One
- Born: John Michael O'Keefe; 19 January 1935; Bondi Junction, New South Wales, Australia
- Origin: Sydney, New South Wales, Australia
- Died: 6 October 1978 (aged 43) Sydney, New South Wales, Australia
- Genre: Rock and roll
- Occupation: Singer
- Instrument: Vocals
- Years active: 1953–1978
- Labels: Festival; Leedon; Liberty
- Formerly of: The Dee Jays
- Website: johnnyokeefe.com

John Michael O'Keefe (19 January 1935 – 6 October 1978) was an Australian rock and roll singer whose career began in the early 1950s. A pioneer of Rock music in Australia, his hits include "Wild One" (1958), "Shout!" and "She's My Baby". Often referred to by his initials "J.O'K." or by his nickname "The Wild One", O'Keefe was the first Australian rock n' roll performer to tour the United States, and the first Australian artist to make the local Top 40 charts. He had twenty-nine Top 40 hits in Australia between 1958 and 1973. In his twenty-year career, O'Keefe released over 50 singles, 50 EPs and 100 albums. O'Keefe was also a radio and television entertainer and presenter.

O'Keefe died in 1978 from a drug overdose. He was the younger brother of Australian jurist Barry O'Keefe (a former head of the New South Wales ICAC). His father, Alderman Ray O'Keefe, was Mayor of Waverley Council in the early 1960s. Through Barry, O'Keefe was the uncle of Australian television personality Andrew O'Keefe.

== Early life ==
O'Keefe was born in the eastern Sydney suburb of Bondi Junction on 19 January 1935. He was the second of three children of Raymond Moran O'Keefe and Thelma Edna Kennedy who both were of Irish descent. He was raised as a Catholic and attended the local Catholic primary school, followed by secondary schooling at Waverley College in nearby Waverley.

He had a solid musical background and listened to the radio almost constantly at home although he did not often sing around the house. His parents were both good singers. His mother was an excellent pianist and his father occasionally played in a jazz band. O'Keefe made his stage debut at the age of four when he played the role of "Dopey" in the Waverley College production of Snow White and the Seven Dwarfs. Being unable to read or memorise the script, O'Keefe improvised his part.

The young O'Keefe was intelligent and perceptive, with a great sense of humour, although his school grades fluctuated due to his misbehaviour and the fact that he was easily distracted. Sydney radio personality Gary O'Callaghan, who was a classmate, later recalled that O'Keefe was often in trouble. During his time at high school, he joined the school cadets, where he made good progress learning trumpet, and he reluctantly sang solo in the school choir. He was a keen swimmer, surfer and sailor and often sailed with the Vaucluse Juniors sailing club.

He matriculated in 1951, gaining an 'A' in French and a 'B' in English, mathematics, physics and economics. In 1952, he enrolled in a part-time economics degrees course at the University of Sydney, but soon abandoned it and enrolled in a short course at the College of Retailing in Sydney, after which he went to work in his father's furniture store in Pitt Street, Sydney.

He had already begun performing at dances and 'socials' while at high school, but his interest in music blossomed after he left school. A strong early musical influence was the American singer Johnnie Ray, who toured Australia to great acclaim in the 1950s and O'Keefe began his singing career as a Ray impersonator. During this period he met and became good friends with Alan Dale, also an aspiring singer, who was then employed at the O'Keefe's furniture business.

In December 1952, Dale and O'Keefe were called up for National Service. Dale went into the Army and O'Keefe went into the Royal Australian Air Force. He was stationed at Richmond, approximately 50 kilometres (31 miles) north-west of Sydney and served his six-month period in two blocks, from December–February 1952 and December–February 1953.

== Musical career ==
The first turning point in O'Keefe's career was in early 1953, when he began singing with the quintet of jazz accordionist Gus Merzi at charity dances. During these appearances, O'Keefe would sing his speciality, Johnnie Ray's "Cry", while wearing a pair of trick glasses which squirted water over the audience. Radio personality Harry Griffiths, who met O'Keefe at this time, remembered him as "a bad-tempered ratbag" who often argued with Merzi, although Merzi commented that they never clashed over music.

Recognising O'Keefe's potential, Merzi began tutoring him on piano, encouraging him to broaden his repertoire and helping him to refine his stagecraft. O'Keefe became a regular singer with the Merzi quintet and performed with them every Sunday at the charity shows they performed at the Bondi Auditorium. O'Keefe performed his routine no matter how small the audience, sometimes braving the rotten eggs and fruit thrown at him.

After his second stint of National Service, O'Keefe began singing with Merzi two nights a week, at university college dances, 21st birthdays and private parties. Merzi also managed to get O'Keefe a regular spot on the 2UW live radio show Saturday Night Dancing. Up to this point O'Keefe had performed for free, simply to gain experience. His first paid engagement as a singer was as a Johnnie Ray impersonator, performing on the Bathurst radio station 2BS, for which he was paid £17 plus expenses.

=== Rise to stardom ===
In June 1955, O'Keefe's life changed irrevocably after seeing and hearing Bill Haley singing "Rock Around the Clock" in the film Blackboard Jungle. He realised that this was the style of music he wanted to perform, and dedicated himself to becoming a rock 'n' roll singer and a star.

By 1960, O'Keefe was the most popular and successful singer in Australia and a major TV star. Australian rock historian Ian McFarlane succinctly described O'Keefe's qualities in the Encyclopedia of Australian Rock & Pop:

J.O'K was the first to admit that he was a limited singer, but he possessed an incredible drive, a fierce ambition to succeed, a tireless facility for self-promotion, a tremendous flair for showmanship and a larrikin spirit that was irrepressible.

=== The Dee Jays ===
In September 1956, O'Keefe and his friend Dave Owen, an American-born tenor sax player, formed Australia's first rock'n'roll band, the Dee Jays. The original line-up of the group was Kevin Naughton (guitar), Keith Williams (bass) and Johnny Purser (drums). Naughton left soon after the band formed and he was replaced by Indonesian-born guitarist Lou Casch. Johnny Greenan joined the Dee Jays on tenor saxophone, replacing John Balkin. This was the band that supported a tour by Little Richard and his band.

Casch's contribution to O'Keefe's sound, both live and on record, was considerable. He was born in Ambon in 1924, grew up in Aceh and Jakarta, began playing guitar at an early age, and became a dedicated jazz musician. In 1952, he came to Australia under the Colombo Plan to study medicine at the University of Sydney. He was introduced to O'Keefe by Keith Williams, whom he had known from a jazz trio in which they played. At their first meeting O'Keefe played Casch a selection of rock 'n' roll records and asked him to imitate the guitar playing, which he was easily able to do. Impressed, O'Keefe offered him the job and handed him a pile of records, saying "Here, learn these. The dance is on Saturday night."

Their first performance was at Stones Cabaret in the beach side suburb of Coogee. By early 1957, they were playing four dances a week and performing on Saturdays in the interval between films at the Embassy Theatre, Manly. O'Keefe and the Dee Jays quickly attracted a strong local following.

O'Keefe's trademark was his flamboyant stage attire, which included gold lamé jackets and brightly coloured suits trimmed with fake fur. Many of these outfits were made for him by Sydney show business costumier Len Taylor, although one famous red suit trimmed with leopard-print velvet cuffs and lapels, now in the collection of the Powerhouse Museum, Sydney, was reputedly made by his mother Thelma.

At the time Casch joined the band, they were promoting their own dances at local venues such as the Balmain Workingmen's Institute and Stone's Cabaret. O'Keefe was involved in every aspect of the group's career including hiring the halls, placing ads in the local newspapers and putting up posters. "O'Keefe was the promoter, singer, bouncer, door attendant, sold the ice creams, mixed the drinks and cleaned the halls, while working during the days at his father's furniture store."

At the time, rock 'n' roll and its followers in Sydney often found themselves at odds with non-aficionados. According to Lou Casch, on one occasion, while O'Keefe and the Dee Jays played at an upstairs dance venue in Newtown, an "Italian wedding" reception was also taking place downstairs. Some of the dance patrons came to blows with wedding guests in the men's toilets, and within minutes the fight had erupted into a full-scale riot that spilled out into the street, with police eventually calling in the Naval Shore Patrol to help restore order. It was this incident, according to Casch, that inspired O'Keefe's signature tune, "Wild One".

While the song is credited officially to Greenan, O'Keefe, and Dave Owens, some sources suggest that O'Keefe was not directly involved in the composition. Sydney disc jockey Tony Withers was credited with helping to get radio airplay for the song, but writer credits on subsequent versions often omit Withers, who later worked in the United Kingdom on pirate stations Radio Atlanta and, as Tony Windsor, on Radio London.

"Wild One" was recorded by Jerry Allison with Buddy Holly backing on guitar in 1958 under the alias "Ivan", his middle name, after hearing O'Keefe perform it on tour in Australia. It was released as Real wild child and reached No. 68 on the American Billboard singles chart and was revived in 1986 and recorded by Iggy Pop as "Real Wild Child". A cover by Christopher Otcasek was used on the soundtrack for the movie Pretty Woman starring Julia Roberts and Richard Gere. It was also recorded by Jerry Lee Lewis, Everlife, Joan Jett & The Blackhearts, Glamour Camp, Marshall Crenshaw, Brian Setzer, Wakefield and Jet.

=== Meeting with Lee Gordon ===
O'Keefe first met Bill Haley during his tour in 1957 in Australia. Haley was impressed by O'Keefe, giving him a song to record ("You Hit The Wrong Note, Billy Goat") and recommending him to Ken Taylor, A&R manager of leading local record company Festival Records. Taylor, however, failed to act on Haley's advice, so O'Keefe then famously took matters into his own hands and began telling the local press that he had in fact been signed to Festival. Anxious not to lose face, Taylor auditioned O'Keefe and signed him to the label.

O'Keefe's debut single (issued as a 78 rpm record), "You Hit The Wrong Note, Billy Goat" b/w "The Chicken Song", was released in July 1957 but it failed to chart and sold poorly, as did the follow-up, a cover of Pat Boones "Love Letters in the Sand" – which O'Keefe later described as the worst record of his career.

O'Keefe had become a close friend of the music concert promoter, Lee Gordon, and O'Keefe and the Dee Jays' popularity really took off when they were installed as the featured support act for Gordon's famous "Big Show" concert bills at the Sydney Stadium. These concerts were landmarks in Australian popular entertainment, being among the first tours to feature leading overseas rock'n'roll stars, including Little Richard, Bo Diddley, Buddy Holly and Jerry Lee Lewis; Gordon also toured many top jazz acts of the day, including the first visits to Australia by black jazz artists such as Louis Armstrong.

O'Keefe and the Dee Jays' first major break was a support spot on Lee Gordon's first "Big Show" rock'n'roll tour, which starred Little Richard, Gene Vincent, and Eddie Cochran. When Gene Vincent and his band were stranded in Honolulu on their way to Australia, Gordon contacted O'Keefe and asked him to fill in for Vincent for the first night of the tour in Wollongong. This was followed by another support spot on the second all-star Big Show, which included The Crickets (with lead singer Buddy Holly on his first and only Australian tour), Jerry Lee Lewis and Paul Anka.

During this period The Dee Jays also acted as the backing band for many of the international acts that Gordon toured, since they were at the time the only rock'n'roll band in the country who could read music. According to Lou Casch, they backed acts including Chuck Berry, The Everly Brothers, Fabian, Tab Hunter, Jimmie Rodgers and Ricky Nelson, and on his 1960 tour, Nelson was booed by fans of O'Keefe's whom he had reputedly planted in the audience. Their skill and energy and O'Keefe's frantic performances also saw them upstage many of the visiting performers. Casch recalled that he actually played behind Jerry Lee Lewis, whose own backing musicians were so daunted by the Dee Jays' performance that they got too drunk to play.

=== Commercial breakthrough ===
Their first EP, Shakin' At The Stadium, included JOK's signature tune "Wild One", co-written by O'Keefe with Greenan, Owens and top Sydney DJ Tony Withers. This became his first hit in March 1958, peaking at No. 20 on the newly established Sydney Top 40 (at this time there was no national pop chart in Australia). Although it was claimed that it was recorded live at the Stadium, it was in fact a studio recording, overdubbed with the sound of a real stadium audience.

O'Keefe issued three more singles during 1958: "Over The Mountain" b/w Lawdy Miss Clawdy", "So Tough" b/w That'll Be Alright" (a cover of The Cuff Links song which reached No. 12 in Sydney) and "I Ain't Gonna Do It" b/w "Could This Be Magic?"

O'Keefe had played a few dates in New Zealand in 1958, but in early 1959 rising NZ promoter Harry M Miller organised a two-month tour. O'Keefe took the staid NZ music scene by storm, although he was banned from playing at some halls and faced problems getting airplay. At that time the New Zealand Broadcasting Corporation had a monopoly on radio, they had only one J.O'K. record in their library, and they refused to play his new single "Wild One" – although a hastily issued version by NZ rocker Johnny Devlin was played. O'Keefe also toyed with the local press, playing on Lou Casch's exotic appearance by telling journalists that Casch was the son of an Arrernte Aboriginal chieftain from Ayers Rock and that Casch's hand-built guitar was made from mulga wood.

In mid-October 1959, O'Keefe performed in shows titled Lee Gordon's 1959 Rock'n'Roll Spectacular. The Sydney concerts were edited into a film called Rock 'n' Roll which premiered on 30 October. The film, thought lost but rediscovered in 2020, includes rare footage of a 1950s rock and roll concert in Australia.

=== U.S. visits, 1959–1960 ===
"She's My Baby" was recorded in Los Angeles with producer Snuff Garrett during O'Keefe's first visit to the United States in October 1959. It was recorded at a 5-song session at Goldstar recording studios in Hollywood on 5 November 1959 ("She's My Baby", "It's Too Late", "Own True Self", "Ready For You" and "Come On and Take My Hand"). His decision to try his luck in the USA was strongly opposed by his friend and mentor Lee Gordon but the ever-ambitious O'Keefe had already set his sights on breaking into the American market, and in L.A. he met with record executive Mickey Shaw who introduced him to executives of Liberty Records.

In February 1960 O'Keefe returned to the U.S. for a promotional tour, where he was promoted as "The Boomerang Boy", and much to his chagrin, O'Keefe was obliged to give boomerang throwing exhibitions. According to Ian McFarlane, Liberty offered to pay $5 to anyone who could throw further than the singer, but they had to pay out many times at one exhibition when O'Keefe turned up drunk.

=== Car accident ===
In the early hours of 27 June 1960, O'Keefe, Greenan and Greenan's wife Janice were driving back to Sydney from the Gold Coast. About 20 kilometres north of Kempsey, the Plymouth ploughed into a gravel truck. While the front of the large car bore the brunt of the very severe impact, all three were seriously injured. O'Keefe's face was smashed and Greenan was thrown out of the car, landing six metres away on the Pacific Highway, causing a fractured vertebra and loss of front teeth. Janice Greenan suffered a severe concussion. O'Keefe suffered multiple lacerations, a concussion and fractures to his head and face. He lost four teeth, and his hands were badly lacerated.

O'Keefe was air-lifted back to Sydney for treatment and survived. Many believe he never fully recovered from the accident and that it was the catalyst for his subsequent mental health problems.

=== Continuing career ===
He continued recording and scored another No. 1 hit in August 1960 with "Don't You Know"/"Come on And Take My Hand", and the next single, "Ready For You"/"Save The Last Dance For Me", reached No. 4 in November. In January 1961, O'Keefe attempted another tour of the United States, but it was also unsuccessful.

His run of Australian hits continued in spite of his mounting personal problems. "I'm Counting on You" became his second No. 1 hit in August 1961, followed by a third chart-topper, "Sing (And Tell The Blues So Long)" in March 1962, and "I Thank You", which reached No. 22 in December.

O'Keefe's tenure with Six O'Clock Rock ended in mid-1961, and in October he moved to ATN-7 as compere of the Johnny O'Keefe Show. The show was a major success, but this only added to his already hectic workload and increased the pressure on him. In August 1962 he suffered another breakdown and spent two months in the psychiatric ward at Royal Prince Alfred Hospital in Sydney, beginning what was to become a repeating cycle of much-publicised breakdowns, hospitalisation and recovery. During his convalescence the TV show was renamed Sing, Sing, Sing and he was temporarily replaced as host by folk singer Lionel Long.

O'Keefe scored his fourth Australian No. 1 hit with "Move Baby Move" in July 1963, and also "Shake Baby Shake" (#8, October 1963) and "Twist It Up" which reached No. 32 in December 1963.

It was around this time that O'Keefe finally parted ways with his backing group the Dee Jays, as he devoted more and more time to TV. It was an era in which many major artists mimed songs at outdoor locations, such at Manly Beach's Fairy Bower in 1967. Live performances began to taper off. The Dee Jays stayed together, however, and continued performing until 1980.

=== Decline in popularity ===
Fearing that O'Keefe might have to be replaced as compère, the Seven network renamed O'Keefe's TV show Sing Sing Sing in February 1963, but its popularity continued nevertheless.

By late 1963, a new music trend from the UK known as Merseybeat was gaining momentum. Within a few months, the emergence of the new wave of guitar/vocal groups led by the Beatles and the Rolling Stones ushered in a new era in popular music, and their advent signalled the start of a rapid decline in O'Keefe's career. These overseas acts inspired a new generation of local 'beat' stars, spearheaded by Bobby & Laurie, Billy Thorpe & the Aztecs, Ray Brown & The Whispers, Tony Worsley & The Fabulous Blue Jays, Normie Rowe, and The Easybeats, who took the Australian pop scene by storm, and, at least in Australia, soon came to rival the popularity of the biggest overseas acts.

Although he had helped the careers of many of his rock'n'roll contemporaries, O'Keefe was resistant to the changes in pop music and made himself unpopular among the new groups by banning "long-haired" acts, such as The Missing Links, from appearing on Sing, Sing, Sing. O'Keefe was alienated by the new developments in pop music, and later described this period as "the biggest downer in my career". Another major blow to O'Keefe was the sudden death of his musical partner and friend Lee Gordon, who died from a heart attack in London on 7 November 1963.

O'Keefe's last major hit of the Sixties came in April 1964, two months before the Beatles toured Australia, when "She Wears My Ring" reached No. 2 on the singles chart. The follow-up single charted significantly lower, peaking at a modest No. 30, and titles of the two songs seemed, in retrospect, to presage the downturn in O'Keefe's career the A-side, "Rock'n'Roll Will Stand" was backed by a cover of The Shirelles' "Will You Still Love Me Tomorrow?".

His popularity continued to decline and sales of his records fell. Sing, Sing, Sing was cancelled in October 1965.

In January 1967, O'Keefe compèred a new TV show called Where The Action Is. It was produced and broadcast by the newly opened Channel TEN-10 and filmed at various outdoor locations around Sydney. O'Keefe released a 'spin-off' album also titled Where The Action Is in 1967, but the series was not successful and budget problems and low ratings led to its cancellation in November 1967.

From 1968 onwards O'Keefe devoted most of his time to performing on the burgeoning Australian club and cabaret circuit, and aside from the 1969 live LP Live on the Gold Coast, his only album releases were compilations of past hits, mostly issued on Festival's budget label Calendar.

During the later 1960s, O'Keefe doggedly continued recording new singles, but only three made it into the Top 40: "Sun's Gonna Shine Tomorrow"(#38, May 1966), "Be Careful of Stones That You Throw" (#28, August 1966) and a re-release of "She's My Baby", which reached No. 22 in August 1969.

=== 1970s ===
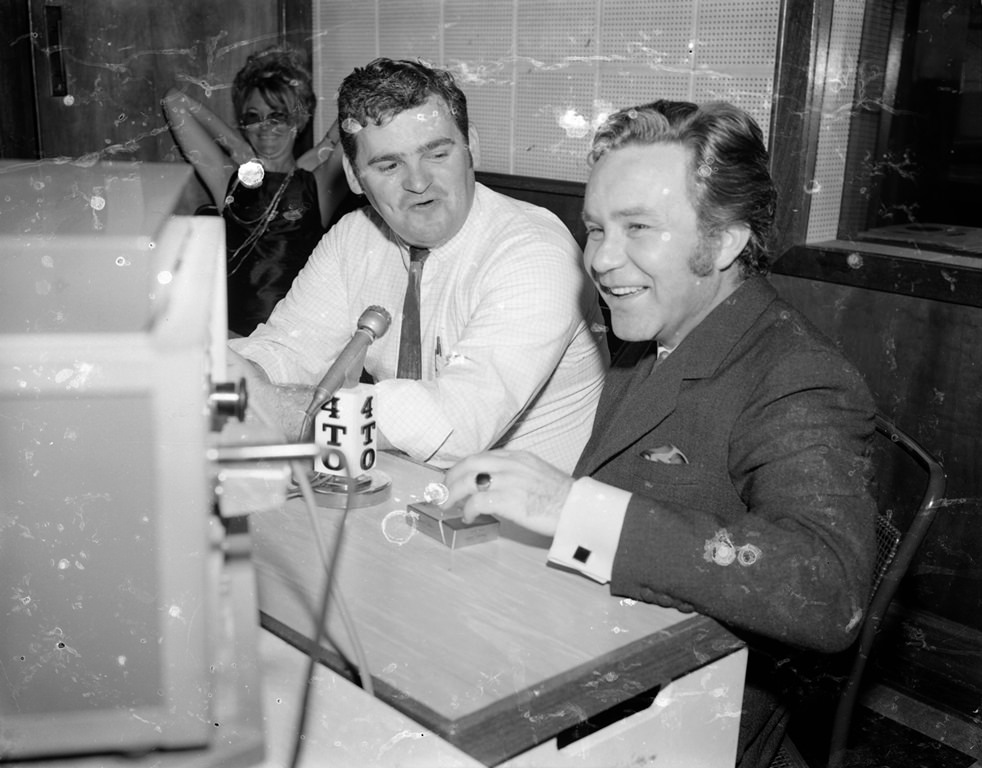
O'Keefe interviewed by Stewart 'Stuie' McInnes on Radio 4TO on 19 December 1969.

In 1969, O'Keefe toured Vietnam to entertain Australian troops stationed there. On the business front, he signed a new contract with Festival at the end of 1969 and continued to record and release singles. In July 1972 that he scored another hit with a re-recorded version of 1958 hit "So Tough", which reached No. 7 in September 1972.

In January 1973, O'Keefe performed at the second Sunbury Pop Festival. MC Paul Hogan jokingly introduced him as a "newcomer" and urged the crowd to "give him a go", and although he was at first greeted with some jeering and booing, by the end of his set he had completely won over the crowd.

In early 1974, he scored his last big hit with a version of the old Inez and Charlie Foxx hit "Mockingbird", recorded as a duet with vocalist Margaret McLaren. It became his 29th Australian hit, reaching No. 8 nationally in April 1974. It fared well against stiff competition from the better-known James Taylor-Carly Simon version, which was rush-released in Australia to compete with it, but many of O'Keefe's supporters claim that O'Keefe's version was deliberately ignored by some commercial radio stations, in favour of its US rival.

In August 1974, O'Keefe put together a package tour called "The Good Old Days of Rock'n'Roll" which featured many of his old friends including Dinah Lee, Johnny Devlin, Lonnie Lee, Jade Hurley, Barry Stanton, Tony Brady and Laurel Lea. It premiered at St George Leagues Club in Sydney and continued successfully for the next four years. O'Keefe continued to issue singles, including a cover of the Harry Vanda-George Young song "Saturday Night", originally recorded by The Easybeats.

O'Keefe's last public appearance was on Seven Network's Sounds program, taped on 30 September 1978, six days prior to his death.

== Personal life ==
O'Keefe married Marianne Renate Willimzik, a 23-year-old hairdresser, at St Therese's Catholic Church, Dover Heights, on 2 August 1958. They had three children. Their relationship eventually concluded due to the pressure of O'Keefe's career demands, and they divorced in 1966.

By the early 1960s, O'Keefe was reaching the limits of his physical and mental endurance. Given the severe head injuries he had sustained in his 1960 car crash, it is also possible that O'Keefe was suffering from undiagnosed neurological trauma which may have affected his personality and contributed to his later mental health and drug issues. These problems were undoubtedly exacerbated by his heavy drug and alcohol use.

In 1961, after the second US tour collapsed, he flew to London on impulse, but he reportedly overdosed on a combination of alcohol, marijuana and prescription medication in his room at the Park Lane Hotel. He blacked out and woke three days later to find himself in a psychiatric hospital. He spent several days confined in a straitjacket and heavily medicated, but by chance he encountered a staff member who had recently arrived from Australia who recognised him and was able to confirm his identity.

As soon as he was released from close confinement he escaped. By chance he was able to make contact with Gordon, who happened to be in London, and with Gordon's help, and that of O'Keefe's wife and his parents, he was transferred to St George's Hospital to recover. He returned to Australia as soon as he was well enough to travel. Unfortunately this was the first of many such "breakdowns" – O'Keefe would subsequently endure numerous spells in psychiatric hospitals, including Hydebray alcohol rehabilitation hospital, and his drug problems dogged him until the end of his life.

During the late 1960s and into the 1970s, O'Keefe's personal life remained increasingly busy. On 14 February 1975, at the Masonic Hall, Waverley, O'Keefe married for the second time to Maureen Joan Maricic, a 29-year-old fashion consultant. They opened a boutique, J. O'K Creations, in Paddington in 1978. Later that year in 1975, O'Keefe was the subject of This Is Your Life (Australian TV series) in which his father, mother, sister and brother all paid tribute to him. His three young children, John, Vicky and Peter also attended, followed by his second wife, Maureen.

O'Keefe died on 6 October 1978, from cardiovascular collapse caused by an overdose of prescription barbiturates and Methaqualone. He was buried at Macquarie Park Cemetery and Crematorium in Sydney, with full catholic rites.

== Legacy ==
Since his death, O'Keefe's stature has continued to grow, and he has been posthumously accorded the recognition he did not receive in his lifetime. The first major biography on O'Keefe was published in 1982, and several others have been written since including The Wild One by Damian Johnstone and Johnny O'Keefe – The Facts written in 2008 by Lonnie Lee and released by Starlite Records. Besides being a great showman himself, he is also credited for nurturing other Australian talent, like Barry Stanton and Lonnie Lee.

In 1986, the Seven Network produced the successful 'docu-drama' mini-series based on his life, Shout! The Story of Johnny O'Keefe, which starred actor-singer Terry Serio as O'Keefe. The same year, punk legend Iggy Pop recorded a cover version of O'Keefe's signature tune "Wild One" under the title "Real Wild Child", which was included on his David Bowie-produced album Blah Blah Blah and released as a single. Samples from the Iggy Pop version were incorporated into the theme music for the ABC's long-running late-night music video show Rage, which premiered in 1987, and the opening credits of the show include footage of O'Keefe on stage.

In 1988, O'Keefe was posthumously inducted into the ARIA Hall of Fame.

In 1994, the Powerhouse Museum in Sydney recognised O'Keefe's contributions in a major exhibition of Australia's rock and pop history titled Real Wild Child and a comprehensive CD-ROM based on the exhibition was later released with the same title.

In 1998, Australia Post issued a special stamp edition celebrating the early years of Australian rock'n'roll; the first stamp in the series commemorated O'Keefe's rise to stardom in 1958.

O'Keefe's life story and career also inspired the stage musical, Shout! The Legend of The Wild One, with book by John-Michael Howson, David Mitchell and Melvyn Morrow and featuring music made famous by O'Keefe and other hits of the 1950s.

A portrait of O'Keefe by Australian artist Ivan Durrant, titled "A Little Bit Louder Now", is in the collection of the National Portrait Gallery in Canberra. On 10 June 2004, a 5-metre tall Monument titled "The Wild One", created by sculptor Dr. Alex Sandor Kolozsy CDVA, was unveiled at the Coolangatta/Tweed Heads, Twin Towns Services Club in memory of O'Keefe.

"She's My Baby" was added to the National Film & Sound Archive's Sounds of Australia registry in 2007. In October 2010, his 1958 album, Wild One, was listed in the top 40 in the book, 100 Best Australian Albums.

In December 2020, O'Keefe was listed at number 39 in Rolling Stone Australia's "50 Greatest Australian Artists of All Time" issue.

== Discography ==
=== Charting albums ===
| Year | Album | Chart positions |
| Year | Album | AUS |
|---|---|---|
| 1976 | Let True Love Begin | 53 |
| 1985 | The Legend of Johnny O'Keefe | 13 |
| 1986 | Shout! – TV Soundtrack | 27 |
| 1996 | The Hits: Ballads and Rarities | 89 |
| 2008 | The Very Best Of | 21 |

=== Charting EPs ===
| Year | EP | Chart positions |
| Year | EP | AUS |
|---|---|---|
| 1957 | Shake Baby Shake | 36 |
| 1958 | Wild One | 23 |

=== Singles ===
| Year | Single | Chart positions | Catalogue |
| Year | Single | AUS | Catalogue |
|---|---|---|---|
| 1957 | "Billygoat (You Hit the Wrong Note)" | - | FS-1532 |
| 1957 | "Am I Blue?" | - | SP-45-1562 |
| 1957 | "Cathedral in the Pines" (with Richard Gray) | - | SP-45-1632 |
| 1958 | "Over the Mountain" | 24 | FS-2004 |
| 1958 | "So Tough" | 16 | FK-3037 |
| 1958 | "I Ain't Gonna Do It" | 44 | FK-3053 |
| 1959 | "What Da Ya Know" | 28 | FK-3066 |
| 1959 | "Why Do They Doubt Our Love?" | 8 | FK-3081 |
| 1959 | "Swanee River" | 12 | LS-568 |
| 1959 | "Shout (Parts 1 & 2)" | 2 | LS-575 |
| 1959 | "She's My Baby" | 1 | LS-582 |
| 1960 | "It's Too Late" | 17 | LS-595 |
| 1960 | "Don't You Know (Pretty Baby)" | 1 | LS-600 |
| 1960 | "Ready for You" | 10 | LS-607 |
| 1961 | "Swing Low, Sweet Chariot" | - | LK-49 |
| 1961 | "I'm Counting on You" | 1 | LK-113 |
| 1962 | "Sing" | 6 | LK-184 |
| 1962 | "Yes Indeed I Do" | 38 | LK-272 |
| 1962 | "I Thank You" | 24 | LK-298 |
| 1963 | "Move Baby Move" | 1 | LK-378 |
| 1963 | "Shake Baby Shake" | 19 | LK-454 |
| 1963 | "Twist It Up" | 44 | LK-493 |
| 1964 | "She Wears My Ring" | 9 | LK-574 |
| 1964 | "Shout (Parts 1 & 2)" (re-recorded) | 49 | LK-636 |
| 1964 | "Rock 'n Roll Will Stand" | 25 | LK-770 |
| 1965 | "Cry Cry Baby" | - | LK-886 |
| 1966 | "The Sun's Gonna Shine Tomorrow" | 51 | LK-1293 |
| 1966 | "Be Careful of Stones That You Throw" | 54 | LK-1416 |
| 1966 | "Hey Girl" | - | LK-1533 |
| 1967 | "Ooh Poo Pah Doo" | - | LK-1653 |
| 1967 | "Where the Action Is" | - | LK-1716 |
| 1967 | "Just a Closer Walk with Thee" | - | LK-1974 |
| 1969 | "She's My Baby" (re-recorded) | 12 | LK-3220 |
| 1970 | "Confessions of a Lonely Man" | 46 | FK-3493 |
| 1971 | "I am Blessed" | - | FK-4098 |
| 1971 | "(You've Got Me) Dangling on a String" | - | FK-4482 |
| 1972 | "So Tough" (re-recorded) | 7 | FK-4774 |
| 1972 | "High Rollin' Man" | 84 | FK-4917 |
| 1973 | "Mockingbird" (with Margaret McLaren) | 8 | FK-5177 |
| 1973 | "Rock 'n Roll Music" | 75 | K-5392 |
| 1974 | "Saturday Night" | 100 | K-5583 |
| 1975 | "On the Road" | 61 | K-5795 |
| 1975 | "Full Blooded Natural Man" | - | K-6114 |
| 1976 | "I Thank You" (re-recorded) | - | K-6433 |
| 1977 | "One of Those Nights" | 92 | K6921 |
| 1978 | "High Rollin' Man" (re-release) | - | K-7274 |
| 1981 | "Ready for You" | - | K-8593 |
| 1986 | "Sing" (Remix) | - | K-9999 |
| 1986 | "Mockingbird" (with Margaret McLaren) (re-release) | - | K-45 |

=== Charting B-sides ===
| Year | B-Side | Chart Positions | Catalogue |
| Year | B-Side | AUS | Catalogue |
|---|---|---|---|
| 1958 | "That'll Be Alright" | 48 | FK-3037 |
| 1959 | "Peek a Boo" | 66 | FK-3066 |
| 1959 | "You Excite Me" | 36 | FK-3081 |
| 1959 | "Own True Self" | 1 | LS-582 |
| 1960 | "Jubilee" | 17 | LS-595 |
| 1960 | "Come on and Take My Hand" | 1 | LS-600 |
| 1960 | "Save the Last Dance for Me" | 10 | LS-607 |
| 1961 | "Right Now" | 1 | LK-113 |
| 1962 | "To Love" | 6 | LK-184 |
| 1962 | "Heaven Sent" | 24 | LK-298 |
| 1963 | "You'll Never Cherish a Love So True" | 1 | LK-378 |
| 1963 | "Good Luck Charm" | 19 | LK-454 |
| 1963 | "Twist and Shout" | 44 | LK-493 |
| 1964 | "Let's Love Tonight" | 9 | LK-574 |
| 1964 | "Will You Still Love Me Tomorrow" | 25 | LK-770 |
| 1966 | "My Heart Belongs to Only You" | 54 | LK-1416 |

== Awards and nominations ==
=== ARIA Music Awards ===
The ARIA Music Awards is an annual awards ceremony that recognises excellence, innovation, and achievement across all genres of Australian music. They commenced in 1987. O'Keefe was inducted into the Hall of Fame in 1988.

| Year | Nominee / work | Award | Result |
|---|---|---|---|
| 1988 | himself | ARIA Hall of Fame | inductee |

=== King of Pop Awards ===
The King of Pop Awards were voted by the readers of TV Week. The King of Pop award started in 1967 and ran through to 1978.

| Year | Nominee / work | Award | Result |
|---|---|---|---|
| 1972 | himself | Special Gold Award for '20 years service to the Industry' | Won |
| 1976 | himself | Contribution to Australian Pop Industry | Won |

=== Mo Awards ===
The Australian Entertainment Mo Awards (commonly known informally as the Mo Awards), were annual Australian entertainment industry awards. They recognise achievements in live entertainment in Australia from 1975 to 2016. Johnny O'Keefe won one award in that time, and the encouragement award was named after him.

| Year | Nominee / work | Award | Result (wins only) |
|---|---|---|---|
| 1976 | Johnny O'Keefe | Special Contribution Award | Won |
