= Leioproctus eruditus =

Scientific classification
- Kingdom: Animalia
- Phylum: Arthropoda
- Clade: Pancrustacea
- Class: Insecta
- Order: Hymenoptera
- Family: Colletidae
- Genus: Leioproctus
- Species: L. eruditus

Binomial name
- Leioproctus eruditus Maynard 2013

Species of bee

Leioproctus eruditus, or Leioproctus (Minycolletes) eruditus, is a species of bee in the family Colletidae and subfamily Colletinae. It is endemic to Australia. It was described by Australian entomologist Glynn Maynard in 2013.

== Etymology ==
The specific epithet eruditus (Latin: "polish") is an anatomical reference to the polished supraclypeal area and propodeal triangle.

== Description ==
Female body length is about 7 mm. Integumental colouration is mainly black to dark brown. The hair is mostly white.

== Distribution and habitat ==
The species occurs in inland south-eastern Australia. The type locality is Broken Hill in Far West New South Wales.

== Behaviour ==
The adults are flying mellivores.
