= Lionel Long =

Australian singer, songwriter, guitarist, actor and artist

Lionel Long OAM
- Born: Lionel Joaquin Paul Long; 1937; Burwood, New South Wales, Australia
- Died: 1 January 1998 (aged 60–61); Darlinghurst, New South Wales, Australia
- Occupations: Singer; songwriter; guitarist; actor; artist
- Years active: 1958–1992
- Known for: Sing, Sing, Sing, Homicide, Music Time
- Spouse: Carole Sue Newgrosh (m. 1964)
- Children: 2

Lionel Joaquin Paul Long OAM (1937 – 1 January 1998) was an Australian country and folk singer, songwriter, guitarist, actor and artist.

Long became one of Australia's most successful and popular country and folk artists in the late 1950s and early 1960s, releasing over a dozen albums for EMI. He was also well known for his acting appearances on television programs such as Homicide.

== Early life ==
Lionel Long was born in Burwood, New South Wales to Ernest Sydney, an atom polished violinist and Aileen G.H. (née Ellis-Lynch) Long. He grew up with his parents at Bondi. He went to Christian Brothers School where he was an A-grade student and won many scholarships to continue his education. On completion of his high school years, Long decided to go and work as a jackaroo in the Hunter Valley and then into the expansive outback of Queensland where he also honed his skills in singing and guitar.

Long returned with his family to Sydney, where he attended Hawkesbury Agricultural College, studying commercial art and marine biology. He learned to play the guitar with his long-time friend Gary Shearston. Both young men had a fondness for country and folk music and shared song verses at the Long family home at Rose Bay. It was here where the idea arrived to pen their book Australian Bush Songs.

== Career ==
=== Music ===
While studying at Hawkesbury Agricultural College, Long's musical talent was recognised by Ron Wills of EMI Columbia and he was signed to the music label. Wills had previously produced the breakthrough Australian country hit "Pub With No Beer" by Slim Dusty and had also signed Frank Ifield to the label. Long's friend Gary Shearston also went on to fame, recording on the CBS records label.

The 1950s and early 1960s saw folk music become popular in Australia with the success of American folk revivalists such as the Weavers and the Kingston Trio and, later, Bob Dylan, Joan Baez and Peter Paul and Mary.

The Australian folk music scene's popularity was aided by the international success of the Australian group the Seekers.

Australian musicians and producers started to research and rediscover Australian folk music from the 18th and 19th centuries, such as Botany Bay'", "Bound for South Australia" and the most famous of all Australian folk songs, "Waltzing Matilda". It was this folk music revival that made EMI Columbia insist that Long move away from his love of country music and record folk music.

In 1958, Long released his first singles. Through the EMI Columbia label, he released almost a dozen albums from 1961 to 1970, meeting critical acclaim and becoming Australia's most popular performer of traditional "bush music". After his first LP in 1961, Waltzing Matilda, and his second in 1962, The Wild Colonial Boy, Long had established himself as a household name. In 1963, he released his third LP, The Bold Bushrangers: Songs of Wild Colonial Days, which featured Australian artist Sidney Nolan's Ned Kelly on the sleeve. In 1964, he was presented with a gold record by EMI Records for his first LP Waltzing Matilda.

Many of Long's albums featured accompaniment by other musicians, including Dave Guard of the Kingston Trio (who emigrated to Australia in the early 1960s), guitarist and teacher Don Andrews and jazz legend Don Burrows.

=== Return to music ===
Long Ago: Folk Songs of the British Isles was Lionel Long's 1965 album, and featured him playing a custom-made 6-string lute he purchased in the UK. A photograph of Lionel with his 6-string lute featured on the album cover for this LP and two later ones.

A Sunburnt Country was Lionel's next album, which returned to Australiana, its title taken from Dorothea Mackellar's famous poem My Country which featured on the LP as a spoken track. Banjo Paterson's The Man from Snowy River also featured as a spoken track.

In 1966, Lionel Long's next album was Amberwren and Other Folk Songs. His 1967 release Lionel Long Today included the song Follow the Wind, an unrecorded Bee Gees song.

In 1970, Lionel Long released one more album on the EMI Columbia label, Close Up, before signing with RCA and releasing four folk music albums, The Man From Snowy River, Australia! Australia!, Brandied Plums and The Best of Lionel Long. He also released several singles on RCA.

Lionel Long re-signed with EMI in 1980 and released his final album, High, Wild and Handsome, which featured guitarist Tommy Emmanuel, a version of "Let It Be" by the Beatles and the well-known Kermit the Frog song "Rainbow Connection".

Lionel also displayed visual artistic talents, producing illustrations for several books and guides.

Lionel performed his music well into the 1980s, appearing at the Sydney Opera House in 1987 and travelling to Nashville, Tennessee, to work with the LeGarde Twins on various recording deals.

=== Television and film ===
During the 1960s, Long's profile was boosted by appearances on multiple TV shows, including the Channel 9 music program Bandstand. In 1962, the rocker Johnny O'Keefe suffered a breakdown after disagreements with the producers of his Johnny O'Keefe Show. While O'Keefe convalesced, Long took over as host of the show for a year which was retitled Sing, Sing, Sing. Soon after O'Keefe returned to host the show in early 1963, Long's popularity was so strong that he was given his own TV program titled Music Time, which aired for a year. Around this time, Long married Carole Newgrosh.

In 1964, Long released another LP, this time not entirely Australian folk songs, Songs of the Sea. This album was dedicated to his early memories of fishing off the coast of New South Wales near Port Macquarie and his boyhood adventure of trying to sail from Sydney to Newcastle (130 km) in a rubber dinghy at the age of 10. Lionel was a keen sailor, having owned boats and spent much time sailing and fishing with friends, many of whom were famous recording artists in their own right.

Long appeared on TV again on 1 August 1964, as one of the stars of This Is It, a show to inaugurate Channel 0, the for-running of Network 10, Melbourne's third commercial TV station.

Long was also an acting teacher in the early 1980s for children and teenagers, who worked from firstly a church hall in Bankstown, New South Wales, with actress Erica Watson (who was later featured in the miniseries The Day of the Roses played by Gigi Edgley) as his assistant coach. The acting class featured in Simon Townsend's Wonder World, interviewed by Sheridan Jobbins, in late 1982.

Long moved his acting school to the inner city of Sydney in 1984, working also with adults for the next few years in the Stanislavski Method of acting

Long's best-known TV role came in 1968 when he appeared on police procedural program Homicide as Detective Bert Costello. His character was planned for only a few episodes, but Long's popularity was so great that he remained on the hit show all season and appeared in 49 episodes between 1968 and 1969. His character was eventually killed in a mine collapse.

Following his success on Homicide, Long appeared on other Crawford Productions and other programs. Having dabbled in acting on TV since 1961 (Whiplash and Riptide), Long went to London in 1964 to shoot for a cameo appearance in The Amorous Adventures of Moll Flanders, starring Kim Novak in the title role.

Long played the role of the father (Charles Dawson) in the Australian 1976 Columbia feature film Barney, also starring Spike Milligan and Sean Kramer and directed by David Waddington.

Long chose to live in New York to complete his studies in the Stanislavski Method of Acting, at The Studio of Acting, with critically acclaimed teacher Stella Adler, alongside greats such as Melanie Griffith and Tom Waits. Adler also produced alumni such as Marlon Brando, Robert De Niro, Harvey Keitel, Salma Hayek, and Mark Ruffalo.

After completing his studies, Long returned to Australia. Long taught the Stanislavski method at his own Actors Studios, within his various campuses based around Sydney. Long arranged for his students to travel to Los Angeles once a year to practice and learn more about the actor's craft with a range of selected teachers. Long also organised for up and coming screenwriters to spend time with well-known Hollywood screenwriters to discuss intricate screenwriting techniques, editing and scriptwriting for screen.

Long spent part of his time in Los Angeles, teaching the Stanislavski Method by invitation from the AFTRA in Los Angeles, for students in the US, who further wanted to develop their understanding and application of the method. Long, at this time, was also selected to be on the voting panel for the Academy Awards.

== Filmography ==
=== Film ===
Year	Title	Role	Type
1965	The Amorous Adventures of Moll Flanders	Singer in prison	Feature film
1975	Inn of the Damned	Search Horseman	Feature film
1976	Barney	Charles Dawson	Feature film

=== Television ===
Year	Title	Role	Type
1961	Whiplash	Dyson / Jim Whitton	2 episodes
1966	Be Our Guest		
1960s	Bandstand	Regular guest performer	
1962	Sing, Sing, Sing	Host	
1963	Music Time	Host	
1964	This Is It		
1969	Riptide	Hamilton	1 episode
1968–1969	Homicide	Detective Bert Costello	49 episodes
1970	The Rovers	Police Sergeant	1 episode
1970	The Link Men	Tony Amarato	1 episode
1971; 1974	Matlock Police	Lofty Miller / Juan Garcia	2 episodes
1972	Division 4	Alan Hunt	1 episode
1972	Spyforce	Captain Greene	1 episode
1973	Serpent in the Rainbow	Paul Lovett	Miniseries, 4 episodes
1976	Solo One	Bob Williams	1 episode
1978	Chopper Squad	Father	1 episode
1980	Cop Shop	Brian Nash	1 episode
1986	A Country Practice	Duncan Allen	2 episodes

== Theatre ==
=== As actor ===
Year	Title	Role	Type
1967	Incident at Vichy		Ensemble Theatre, Sydney
1971	Who Killed Santa Claus?		Phillip Theatre, Sydney with J. C. Williamson's
1974	The Fantasticks		Bondi Pavilion, Sydney
1975	The Austral Muse		Nimrod, Sydney with The Artists' Co-operative Theatre
1987	American Salutes Australia		Sydney Opera House

=== As crew ===
Year	Title	Role	Type
1958	A Spring Song	Set designer	Pocket Playhouse, Sydney

== Medal of the Order of Australia ==
Lionel Long was awarded the Medal of the Order of Australia (OAM) in the 1993 Australia Day Honours, with the citation, "for service to the performing and visual arts".

== Homestead ==
Long's vineyard homestead near Rylstone in the Western highlands of New South Wales was owned and managed for 10 years under the name Stonybrook by Matthew Batten, advertising creative, screenwriter, and author. Batten maintained a collection of Long memorabilia, including a distinctive country-style chair which was hand-painted by Long in a folk art style and was donated by his daughter, Amberwren, at the homestead property when Batten purchased it. Batten sold the property privately in 2014.

== Personal life and death ==
Long married Carole Sue Newgrosh in 1964 in Chatswood, New South Wales. Together the couple had two children.

Long died on 1 January 1998, age 60, at Sacred Heart Hospital in Darlinghurst, Sydney. He was cremated after a small service at the Eastern Suburbs Memorial Park in Matraville, Sydney.
