= Don Andrews (musician) =

Australian musician (1929–2012)

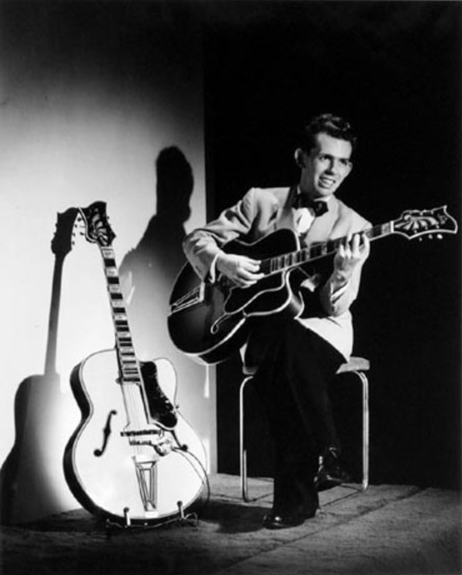
- Andrews in 1947

Background information
- Born: May 29, 1929
- Died: March 5, 2012 (aged 82)
- Occupation(s): Guitarist, composer
- Instrument(s): Guitar, violin
- Years active: 1939–2012

Don Andrews (29 May 1929 – 5 March 2012) was an Australian guitarist, composer, session musician, and music educator.

== Biography ==
Born 29 May 1929, Andrews took up the violin as a child, but began studying the guitar seriously at age 10. His early influences included Phillip Skinner, with whom he studied the guitar in his early days, Ralph Skinner, an American arranger attached to a U.S Army Band stationed for a time in Sydney during World War II, and John Collins, guitarist with Nat King Cole. He contracted polio as a child and as such wore a leg brace.

Andrews became one of the most prominent guitarists in Australia in the late 20th century, accompanying many local and visiting artists both in concert and on recordings. Among the artists he worked with are Rex Stewart, William Clauson, Fred Hartley, Jay Wilbur, Bela Kanitz, The Le Garde Twins, Burl Ives, Larry Adler, Eric Jupp, Isador Goodman, Winifred Atwell and Mel Torme. In the 1960s he was a frequent accompanist on recordings by popular Australian folk performer Lionel Long.

Andrews was also well known in Australia as a guitar teacher and for his many publications on classical, jazz and popular guitar method. He also wrote the first guitar syllabus for the AMEB examination system. He opened the Academy of Guitar in Bondi NSW, and taught there along with George Golla.

In addition to his performing and teaching roles, Andrews composed music for over 30 Australian films including many documentary titles for Film Australia.

For over twenty years Don Andrews was member of staff at the Central Coast Conservatorium in Gosford, NSW, where he served as Head of Guitar Dept and had also served as Artistic Director of the Conservatorium for a period in the early 1990s. The Conservatorium holds an archive of professional materials belonging to Don as well as a collection of the highly regarded guitar method teaching books which are out of print. Along with fellow guitar legend, George Golla, he gave highly popular regular recitals at the Conservatorium combining their talents with duets in jazz and classical music. Don also had a long stint as resident guitarist in Holiday Inn Crowne Plaza (formally Peppers) in Terrigal.

Andrews also had an association with the Maton guitar company and in 1976 the company manufactured a custom-made 7-string semi-acoustic guitar, the DA-7, specifically for him.

Don Andrews suffered serious injuries during a fall in early 2012 – he was transferred from Royal North Shore hospital to Gosford where he died on 5 March 2012, aged 82, with his wife, Monica, by his side..
