= 2BH =

Broken Hill, New South Wales, Australia; Australia
- Broadcast area: Broken Hill RA1 ()
- Frequency: 567 kHz AM

Programming
- Language: English
- Format: News, Sport, Entertainment

Ownership
- Owner: Broadcast Operations Pty Ltd; (Super BH 567 Broken Hill Pty Ltd)
- Sister stations: 2HIL

History
- First air date: 30 June 1934; 91 years ago

Technical information
- Power: 500 watts
- Transmitter coordinates: 31°56′23″S 141°26′36″E

Links
- Website: Official website

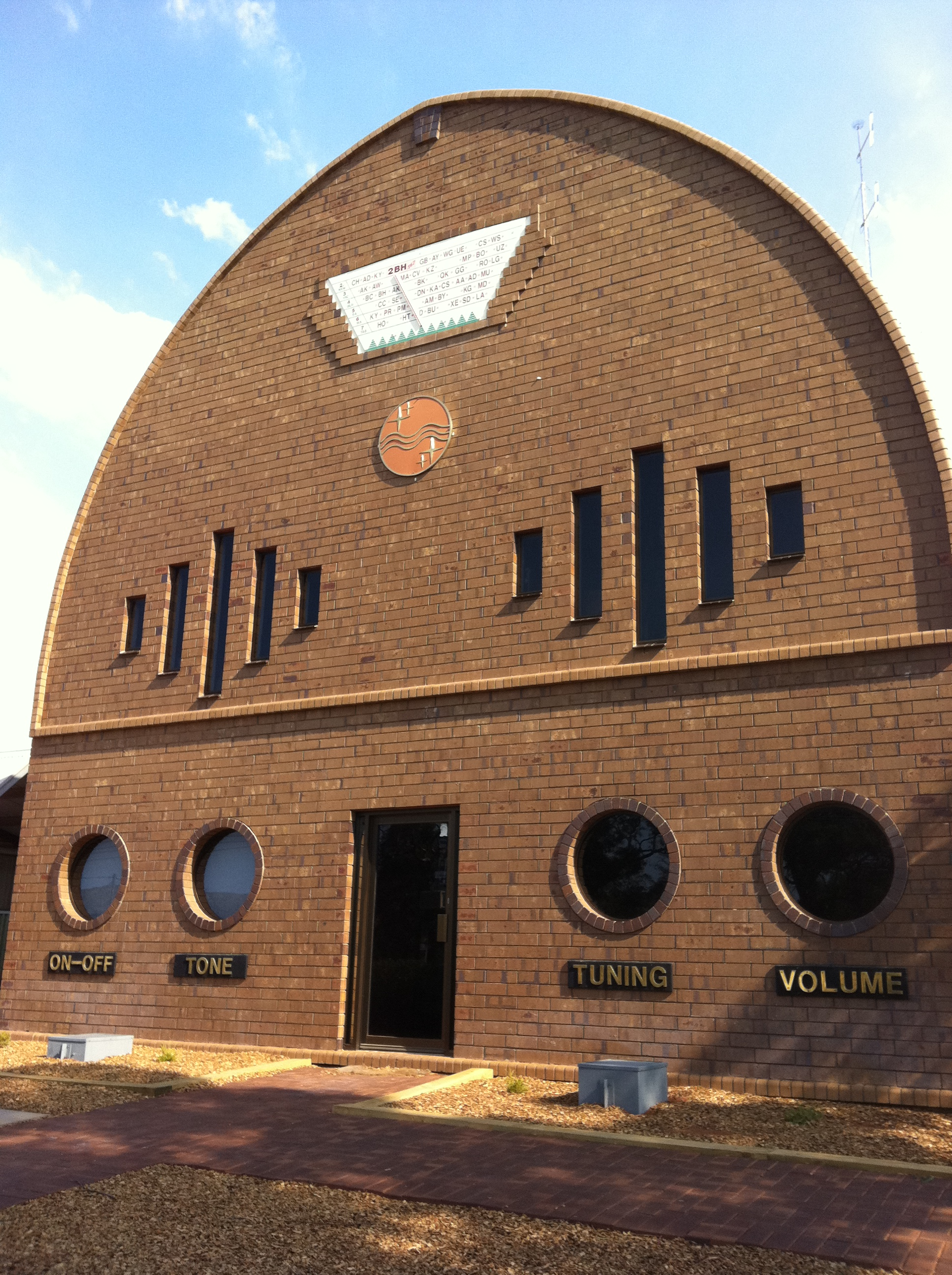
2BH studios

2BH is an Australian radio station owned by the Super Radio Network. The station serves Broken Hill, New South Wales and parts of the Far West region.

The station has been broadcasting on the AM band for over 80 years, its first transmission being in July 1934. The current format is "News, Sport and Talk", but they also play Gold music from the 60s, 70s and 80s and Australian Country music.

Its building (shown) is shaped as an old radio and is a tourist attraction on Broken Hill; some tour buses and companies include it in their tours.

Upstairs in the station is a "Museum" of different radios and transmitters, tape reels and speakers. These range from the 1940s Gulbransen Super-Heterodyne to the 1948 Kriesler Radio through to old radio broadcasting equipment. Most of the equipment on display is Australian made. Unfortunately almost all of this equipment is thought to be out of order.

2BH 567AM has a local program for 3 hours a day, from 5:30am CST to 8:30am CST with the "Bigger Brighter Brekkie Show".
