= Startime (Australian TV series) =

Australian television series

- Genre: Variety
- Presented by: John Laws
- Country of origin: Australia
- Original language: English

Production
- Producer: Gil Rodin
- Running time: 60 minutes

Original release
- Network: ATN-7
- Release: 2 September 1962 – 1963

Startime is an Australian television series which aired 1962 to 1963. A Sydney-produced variety series with emphasis on music, it was hosted by John Laws and produced by ATN-7, with the series shown interstate (such as on HSV-7 in Melbourne). In Sydney it aired each Saturday at 7:30PM in a 60 minute timeslot. It was produced by American Gil Rodin, and was seen as a follow-up to the Revue '62 series.

Despite having aired in an era where music shows were often wiped, a large number of episodes of the series are held by the National Film and Sound Archive.
