= Sun 969 =

Coordinates: 23°46′00″S 133°52′24″E

Alice Springs, Northern Territory; Australia
- Broadcast area: Alice Springs
- Frequency: 96.9 MHz
- Branding: Sun 969

Programming
- Format: Contemporary hit radio

Ownership
- Owner: Broadcast Operations Group (Alice Springs Commercial Broadcasters)
- Sister stations: 8HA, Gold FM

Links
- Website: sunfm.com.au

Sun 969 is Alice Springs' only local commercial radio station on the FM band. The station broadcasts from its premises on the Stuart Highway just outside Alice Springs with nightly, syndicated broadcasts from a local pub, Bojangles.

== Networked shows ==
- Hamish and Andy's Happy Hour
- The Dan & Maz Show
- The Hot Hits Live from LA
- Fitzy and Wippa
- Take 40 Australia
- Rick Dees Weekly Top 40
