= Jade Hurley =

Jade Hurley OAM
- Born: John Anthony Patrick Hurley; 17 June 1943 (age 83); Sydney, New South Wales, Australia
- Origin: Sydney, New South Wales, Australia
- Genres: Rock and roll; country rock; country pop
- Occupation: Musician
- Instruments: Vocals; piano; banjo
- Years active: 1957–present
- Label: Festival
- Website: jadehurley.net

John Anthony Patrick Hurley (born 17 June 1943), who performs as Jade Hurley, is an Australian country music singer-songwriter and pianist. Hurley's hit singles are "How I Lied" (1965), "Down in the Riverina" (1974) and "Another Saturday Night" (1982). He was a regular performer on TV including on The Mike Walsh Show in the 1970s to early 1980s. In June 1998 he was awarded the Order of Australia Medal, "for service to the entertainment industry and to the community, particularly in the area of fund raising for groups including the arthritis foundation of NSW, the Australian Cancer Foundation for medical research and Camp Quality."

== Biography ==
Jade Hurley was born on 17 June 1943 in Sydney as John Anthony Patrick Hurley. The performance name, Jade, was provided by Australian rock and roller, Johnny O'Keefe, in the 1960s because of gloves that Hurley wore. Leon Isackson of Ray Hoff and the Offbeats recalled auditioning the pianist in October 1959, "[Hurley] figured that he needed a gimmick to cover up for his rude piano playing so he wore bright jade green gloves with the fingers cut out. They didn't help much. We sacked him two weeks later."

Hurley had started his music career at the age of 14 with his first band, the Rockin' Rebels, in Sydney. He went solo, with the help of O'Keefe, appearing on the latter's TV show – including his debut in 1960 – on Six O'Clock Rock. Hurley was dubbed "Australia's King of Country Rock" by O'Keefe and was a support act on O'Keefe's live performances. He also appeared on Australia's version of Bandstand.

Hurley's early singles were mostly his own written material, including "How I Lied" (1965), which peaked in the top 30 in Brisbane. His country-pop vocals were combined with the melodic and rhythmic feel of the current beat era. With the exception of his cover version of "Gold and Silver" (1966), his charting singles were his own compositions: "My Baby Judy" (1965), "I'm Ashamed of You" (1966) and "Down in the Riverina" (1974). Later Hurley changed over to country music although his live shows also included rock and roll favourites.

Hurley worked on The Mike Walsh Show from the 1970s to early 1980s, with his "Golden Oldens" music segment, where he performed cover versions of songs from the 1950s and 1960s. Due to the show he was, "identified with MOR performers rather than as a rocker" and by 1981 he was described as a "grannies' heart-throb" but he explained, "When I do live shows, the audience is usually made up of housewives who have seen me on the Walsh show. They bring their husbands along to the club."

He regularly toured Australia in a motor home, "playing in tours up and down the country and doing the RSL and club circuit in NSW." In 2008 he broke attendance records at the Tamworth Country Music Festival when 1550 people turned up to his show. In March 2009 a thief stole jewellery and other items from his motor home: in the following month most of it had been recovered by police. On 23 March 2019 Hurley appeared on the podcast, Wayne's Wonder World.

== Discography ==
=== Studio albums ===
List of albums, with selected chart positions
Title	Album details	Peak chart positions
Title	Album details	AUS
King of Country Rock	Released: 1975; Format: LP; Label: Festival Records (L35705)	76
Jade Hurley's 20 Golden Oldens	Released: 1979; Format: LP; Label: Festival Records (L 27041)	-
Solid Gold	Released: 1980; Format: LP; Label: Festival Records (L 29004)	70
No Stopping	Released: 1980; Format: LP; Label: Festival Records (L 30140)	-
Jade Hurley	Released: 1980; Format: LP; Label: Festival Records (L 37023)	-
More Golden Oldens	Released: 1981; Format: LP; Label: Festival Records (RML 53010)	-
Jade Hurley's Rock N Roll Party	Released: 1982; Format: LP; Label: Festival Records (RML 52016)	-
Jade Hurley's Rock N Roll Party	Released: 1982; Format: LP; Label: Festival Records (RML 52016)	-
Rockin' On	Released: 1983; Format: LP; Label: K-Tel (NA 647)	75
Great Balls Of Fire (24 Rock 'N Roll Greats)	Released: 1984; Format: LP; Label: J & B Records (JB183)	64
Country and Love Songs	Released: Format: CD; Label: Jade Hurley (JHCD03)	-

== Awards and honours ==
Hurley was awarded an Order of Australia Medal (OAM) for his contribution to the entertainment industry encouraging and nurturing young talent, and for his work with charitable organisations including Arthritis Foundation (NSW), Camp Quality and Australian Cancer Research Foundation. Hurley also served as an alderman on the Deniliquin Council and campaigned for Al Grassby in the 1972 Australian federal election.
