= Tweed Daily News =

- Type: Newspaper
- Format: Tabloid
- Owner: News Corp Australia
- Editor: Brad Ricks
- Founded: 1914
- Language: English
- Website: tweednews.com.au

The Tweed Daily News was a daily newspaper serving the Tweed Heads, New South Wales area of Australia. The newspaper is now in website form only and is owned by News Corp Australia.

The Tweed Daily News was circulated to the Tweed Shire community stretching from Palm Beach, Queensland, south to Pottsville, New South Wales.

The Tweed Daily News website is part of News Corp Australia's News Regional Media network.

== History ==
The Tweed Daily News started life in 1888 as the Tweed and Brunswick Advocate and the South Queensland Record made its appearance at the end of October 1888.

The paper was started by William Robert Baker who had worked on newspapers in the Grafton District. Mr Baker and his two apprentices Norman MacKinon and James McLeod set about producing the paper that was the forerunner to today's Tweed Daily News.

The paper started as a weekly paper, then a bi-weekly, and over the years changed names, owners and formats several times. However, on the first day of January in 1914, the bi-weekly papers were combined to introduce the district's first daily newspaper - The Tweed Daily.

After the early days of patiently setting every letter by hand, The Tweed Daily took a major step forward in 1970 when it became the second daily newspaper in Australia to install an offset printing press. Nowadays publishing is done on a computer system and the company's papers are printed at sister sites in Ballina and Yandina.

== See also ==
- List of newspapers in Australia
