= 100.9 ZZZ FM =

Triple Z FM (2ZZZ)
- Lismore, New South Wales; Australia
- Broadcast area: Northern Rivers & Gold Coast
- Frequency: 100.9 MHz

Programming
- Format: Top 40 / Mix

Ownership
- Owner: Broadcast Operations Group; (Richmond River Broadcasters Pty Ltd)

History
- First air date: 1 January 1994

Technical information
- Licensing authority: ACMA
- ERP: 32,000 watts
- Transmitter coordinates: 28.542650°S 153.290153°E

Links
- Public licence information: Profile

Triple Z (call sign 2ZZZ) is a commercial radio station covering New South Wales' Far North Coast, and is part of the Broadcast Operations Group. The station targets the 18–39 market with a mostly top 40 hits format, though in networking hours the format shifts to a more adult contemporary mix.

It began broadcasting on 1 January 1994, from its Goonellabah studios. The first announcer on air was Dave Williams, followed by Vashti Stewart, Neil Marks & Mike O'Reilly. The first song played on air was "The Heat Is On" by Glenn Frey.
