= 4GY =

- Gympie; Australia
- Broadcast area: Gympie RA1
- Frequencies: 107.1 MHz FM; 558 kHz C-QUAM AM Stereo

Programming
- Affiliations: Super Radio Network

Ownership
- Owner: Broadcast Operations Group; (Gympie–Noosa Broadcasters Pty Ltd)

History
- First air date: 3 November 1941
- Former frequencies: 1330 kHz

Technical information
- Power: 5kW (AM)
- ERP: 200W (FM)
- Transmitter coordinates: 26°27′22″S 152°58′47″E (FM); 26°10′18″S 152°49′27″E (AM)

Links
- Website: 4gy.com.au

4GY is an Australian radio station serving the Gympie region. It was opened in November 1941.

== The mid 1980s ==
During the 1980s, 4GY was using the Wesgo format of latest hits and greatest memories. The station broadcast out of the same building it is in today. Music and commercials were on cart. The production studio was equipped with a large 8-track. 2inch, reel to reel machine.
