= His and Hers (Australian TV series) =

TV Series

His and Hers is an Australian television series which aired 1971 to 1972 on the 0-10 Network (now Network Ten). It was a daytime panel discussion show featuring a panel of four women and one man. Originally hosted by Ray Taylor, it was later hosted by John Laws. The show was compared with another panel discussion show titled Beauty and the Beast which Laws also worked on.
