= Wild One (Johnny O'Keefe song) =

1958 song by Johnny O'Keefe

Song by Johnny O'Keefe

from the album Shakin' at the Stadium
- Released: 5 July 1958
- Recorded: 1958
- Genre: Rock and roll
- Length: 2:30
- Label: Leedon; Festival
- Songwriters: Johnny Greenan; Johnny O'Keefe; Dave Owens; Tony Withers

"Wild One" or "Real Wild Child" is an Australian rock and roll song written by Johnny Greenan, Johnny O'Keefe, and Dave Owens. While most sources state that O'Keefe was directly involved in composing the song, this has been questioned by others. Sydney disc jockey Tony Withers was credited with helping to get radio airplay for the song but writer credits on subsequent versions often omit Withers, who later worked in the United Kingdom on pirate stations Radio Atlanta and, as Tony Windsor, on Radio London.

According to O'Keefe's guitarist, Lou Casch, the song was inspired by an incident at a gig in Newtown, Sydney, in about 1957. According to Casch, as O'Keefe and the Dee Jays played at an upstairs venue, an "Italian wedding" reception was taking place downstairs. Some of the dance patrons came to blows with wedding guests in the men's toilets, and within minutes the brawl had become a full-scale riot that spilled out into the street, with police eventually calling in the Navy Shore Patrol to help restore order. In an article by Clinton Walker that tries to answer the question, What was Australia’s first rock’n’roll record? the writer quotes Dee Jays’ saxophonist – and the song’s co-writer – John Greenan corroborating Casch’s account and elaborating upon it.

The release date of the single, 5 July 1958, is considered the birth of Australian rock and roll. Iggy Pop recorded a cover version that was released in 1986, and collaborated with the band Jet on a rerecorded cover released in 2008. The Living End performed the song at the 2008 APRA Awards to mark the 50th anniversary of the original release.

== O'Keefe's recordings ==
O'Keefe was the first artist to record it, on his debut EP Shakin' at the Stadium, released on the Festival label. This version, ostensibly recorded live at the Sydney Stadium, was in fact a studio recording, overdubbed with the sound of a real audience. The title of the track on the EP was Wild one.

An alternative version was recorded and released outside Australia: in the United States (as "Real Wild Child") on Brunswick and in the UK on Coral. "Festival liner notes have always put forward that the crowd overdub was the only difference... Ignoring the crowd overdub at the start, both versions have a different intro and JOK's vocal on the foreign versions is noticeably wilder than on the EP version issued here… As far as I know, the US/UK single version which, IMHO, is markedly superior to our version, was never issued in Australia... at the time, [but] it did finally appear on a local compilation LP in the 70's and is now commonly available on various JOK CDs."
Tony Watson

The song was the first Australian rock recording to reach the national charts, peaking at No. 20.

== Iggy Pop version ==
"Real Wild Child (Wild One)"

Single by Iggy Pop

from the album Blah-Blah-Blah
- B-side: "Little Miss Emperor"
- Released: November 1986
- Genre: New wave; rock; rockabilly
- Length: 3:38
- Label: A&M
- Songwriters: Johnny Greenan; Johnny O'Keefe; Dave Owens; Tony Withers
- Producers: David Bowie; David Richards

Iggy Pop singles chronology
"Cry for Love" (1986)	"Real Wild Child (Wild One)" (1986)	"Isolation" (1987)

Iggy Pop included a cover of the song on his seventh studio album Blah-Blah-Blah (1986). Titled "Real Wild Child (Wild One)", this became a No. 10 hit on the UK Singles Chart in January 1987. In Canada it charted for 20 weeks despite never peaking higher than No. 65 on the RPM 100 Singles chart. It also charted on the US Billboard Album Rock Tracks chart, peaking at No. 27. In New Zealand the song reached No. 1 on the week of 21 June 1987, becoming Pop's biggest hit there.

=== Charts ===
==== Weekly charts ====
Chart (1987)	Peak position
Australia (Kent Music Report)	11
Belgium (Ultratop 50 Flanders)	36
Canada Top Singles (RPM)	65
Europe (European Hot 100 Singles)	48
Ireland (IRMA)	16
Netherlands (Dutch Top 40)	30
Netherlands (Single Top 100)	31
New Zealand (Recorded Music NZ)	1
UK Singles (Official Charts)	10
US Mainstream Rock (Billboard)	27
West Germany (GfK)	28

==== Year-end charts ====
Chart (1987)	Position
Australia (Australian Music Report)	64
New Zealand (RIANZ)	18

=== Jet and Iggy Pop version ===
"The Wild One"

Single by Jet and Iggy Pop
- Released: 19 July 2008
- Recorded: 2008
- Genre: Hard rock
- Length: 1:43
- Label: Warner Music
- Songwriters: Johnny Greenan; Johnny O'Keefe; Dave Owens

Jet singles chronology
"I Spy I Spy" (2007)	"The Wild One" (2008)	"She's a Genius" (2009)

A cover of the song was recorded again by Iggy Pop who teamed up with Aussie rockers Jet, titled "The Wild One". It was released as a CD single and download on 19 July 2008 as a tribute to Johnny O'Keefe and peaked at number 56 on the ARIA Singles Chart.

==== Charts ====
Chart (2008)	Peak position
Australia (ARIA)	56

== Other covers ==
In January and February of 1958 Johnny O'Keefe did a tour of Australia with Buddy Holly and Jerry Lee Lewis, among others. Buddy and Jerry Lee must have been equally impressed by the song or the singer's performance, and they both recorded the song. The song was released as a single by Jerry Allison, a member of the Crickets, using the name Ivan, with Buddy Holly backing him on guitar. Retitled "Real Wild Child," the song became a moderate hit, peaking at No. 68 on the Billboard Hot 100.

"Wild One" was recorded by Jerry Lee Lewis in 1958 but was not released until 1974 on Lewis's album, Rockin' and Free. His version also appears in the 1989 motion picture and soundtrack album for Great Balls of Fire!, Nowhere Boy, and The Complete Novel edition of The Outsiders. His version was used as a plot device in the Australian movie Romulus, My Father. (Note: The 2007 film, set in the late-1950s – early 1960s, has the song being played from a seven-inch 45 RPM single. Jerry Lee "Killer" Lewis is mentioned in the dialogue, and his version, copyright Sun Records 1958, is specified in the end credits.)

It was recorded and released as "Real Wild Child" by Jet Harris, former bassist with the Shadows, in 1962 on Harris' self-titled EP. A further version, "Real Wild Child (Wild One)" was recorded by British guitarist, Albert Lee, on his 1982 self-titled album.

Other artists to record this song include Status Quo, Everlife, The Runaways, Joan Jett & the Blackhearts, Marshall Crenshaw, Brian Setzer, Lee Rocker, Teenage Head, Albert Lee and Wakefield. A cover by Christopher Otcasek appeared on the soundtrack to the film Pretty Woman. The cover by Wakefield appeared in the movie EuroTrip and its soundtrack.

An up-tempo rock version of the song (titled as ''Real Wild Child'') was covered by the fictional band Josie and the Pussycats (lead vocals provided by singer Kay Hanley) in the 2001 film of the same name.

Everlife recorded a pop rock cover of the song for the soundtrack to the 2006 animated movie The Wild.

Girls Aloud singer Sarah Harding recorded a version of the song for the soundtrack to the 2008 film Wild Child.

A variation of this song with different lyrics was also sung by Suzi Quatro and released in 1974 as a track on her second album Quatro. As pointed out by Clinton Walker once again, the songwriting credit was taken by her Chinnichap production team at RAK Records, whose Mike Chapman, as an Australian, would have been well familiar with.

Another cover of the song, with the title "Real Wild Child," was by Levi Kreis portraying Jerry Lee Lewis on the original Broadway cast recording of the Broadway musical Million Dollar Quartet. Kreis won a 2010 Tony Award for Best Featured Actor in a Musical.

A seasonal version of the song was covered in December 2014 by former UK soap actor John Altman with backing band JoanOvArc.

A punk version was recorded in 1980 by Teenage Head on their album Frantic City.

== Further utilisation ==
The 1986 Iggy Pop version of the song is used as the title music to the Australian Broadcasting Corporation's all-night music video program, rage and is also featured in the game SingStar Amped. This version is also used for the opening credits of the German TV series Der letzte Bulle, first aired in Germany in 2010.

In 1998, Australia Post issued a special edition set of twelve stamps celebrating the early years of Australian rock and roll, featuring Australian hit songs of the late 1950s, '60s and early '70s: "Each of them said something about us, and told the rest of the world this is what popular culture sounds like, and it has an Australian accent." One of the stamps featured Johnny O'Keefe and "Wild One".

Everlife's cover was featured in the video game Lego Rock Band.

Wakefield's cover was featured in the video game Tak and the Power of Juju.

Joan Jett's version appeared in an ad for the sitcom Hot in Cleveland. It also appeared during the closing credits of Bad Teacher. In 2014 it was used in a commercial (titled "Family Racer") for the 2015 Hyundai Sonata.
