= 8HA =

Alice Springs; Australia
- Broadcast area: Alice Springs
- Frequency: 900 kHz (Alice Springs) 100.5 MHz (Yulara)

Programming
- Format: Talk/Adult Contemporary

Ownership
- Owner: Broadcast Operations Group (Alice Springs Commercial Broadcasters)
- Sister stations: Gold FM, Sun FM

History
- First air date: 2 March 1971

Links
- Website: http://8ha.com.au

8HA is a radio station based in Alice Springs, Northern Territory, Australia. It broadcasts on the medium wave radio band, at a frequency of 900 kHz. It also broadcasts on radio channel 42 on the Optus Aurora satellite service on Optus C1.

8HA has been on the air since 2 March 1971, and is the only commercial radio station operating on the medium-wave (i.e. AM) band in the Northern Territory (the only other station to do so, 8DN in Darwin, was shut down in the 1990s).

The current format is a mixture of talk and music, with the positioning statement "The Best Songs Of All Time."

Radio air check of 8HA in April 1986
An air check of radio station 8HA captured in April 1986

== Announcers ==
- Sandee Beech (Breakfast)
- Chris Smith (Mornings)
- Mel Elliot (AM News)
- Adrian Renzie (Central Australia Today)
- Steve Hooper (Afternoons)
- Alan Peters (Drive) [Prior Manager]
- Cameron Jackson (PM News)
- Graeme Gilbert (Talk Tonight)
- Gary Stewart (Talk Overnight)
- David Wood [Died 1986]

== Networked Shows ==
Various shows are sourced from other Australian radio stations including A-League Nation, NRL Nation and Super Rugby Nation on (Friday, Saturday and Sunday afternoons / evenings / nights).
