= 2AD =

2AD is an Australian radio station serving the Armidale region. It was opened in February 1936. It was purchased by Broadcast Operations Group in 1995 from the Higginbotham family. It turned 90 in February 2026, before a FM conversion later that year.
