= John Laws =

Australian radio presenter (1935–2025)

John Laws CBE
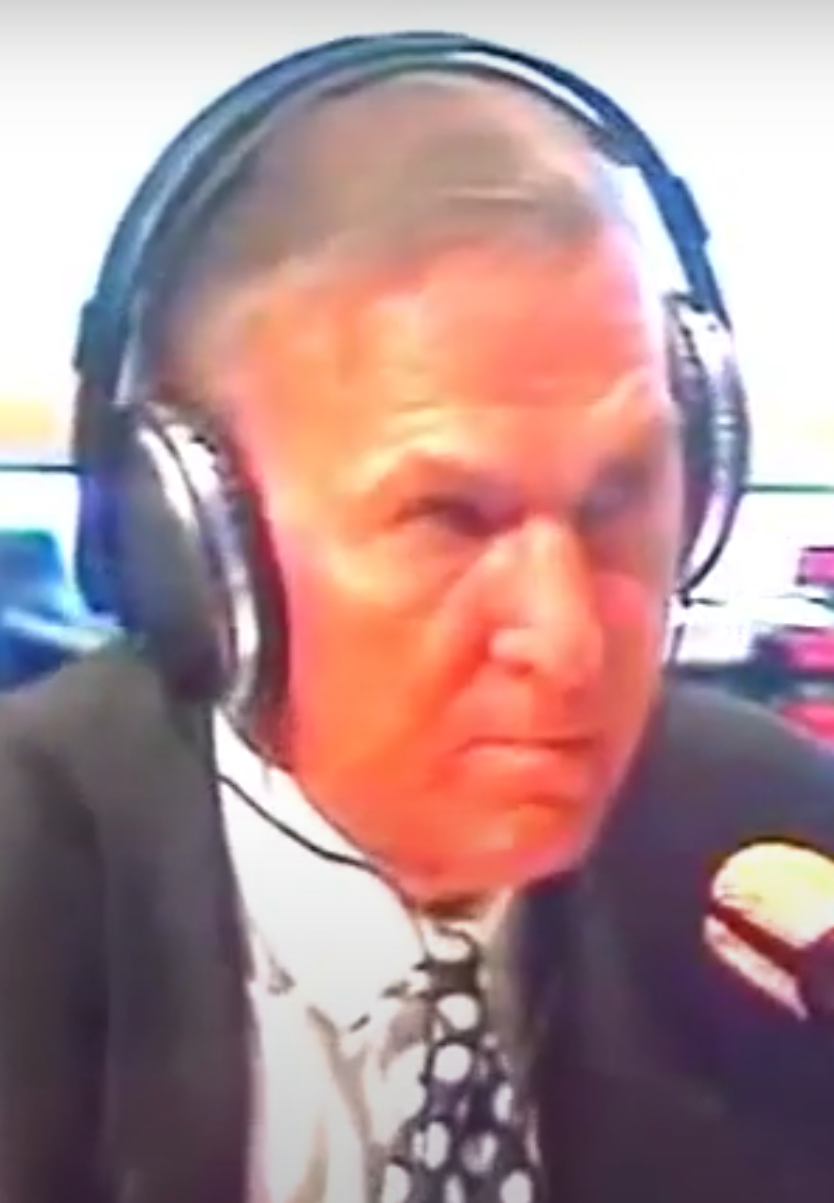
- Laws in 1992
- Born: Richard John Sinclair Laws; 8 August 1935; Wau, Territory of New Guinea (now Papua New Guinea)
- Died: 9 November 2025 (aged 90); Sydney, New South Wales, Australia
- Occupations: Radio presenter; announcer; television host; recording artist; voice-over artist; poet; author
- Years active: 1953–2007; 2011−2024
- Employers: 3BO (1953–1957); 2UE (1957–1959; 1964–1969; 1979–1985; 1988–2007); 2GB (1962–1964; 1985–1988); 2UW (1969–1979); Network Ten (1998); Foxtel (1998–2000); 2SM (2011–2024)
- Spouses: Sonia Zlotkowski (m. 1956; div. 1964) Yvonne Helstrom-Roux (m. 1965; div. 1974) Caroline Hagon (m. 1976; died 2020)
- Children: 5

Richard John Sinclair Laws (8 August 1935 – 9 November 2025) was an Australian radio announcer who had a broadcasting career spanning 71 years. His distinctive voice earned him the nickname Golden Tonsils.

== Early life ==
Born in Wau, Papua New Guinea, on 8 August 1935, to Australian parents, Laws contracted polio twice – once as a child, and again as a young man. He was educated at Mosman Preparatory School and Knox Grammar School in Sydney.

== Career ==
Best known as a talkback radio broadcaster, Laws was one of Australia's highest-paid radio personalities and was involved with Australian talkback radio broadcasting much longer than any other presenter. Although regularly commentating on topical news, Laws did not regard himself as a journalist but as an entertainer and salesman. He was nonetheless one of the few commercial radio personalities whose interviews with state and federal political leaders are considered to have a significant influence on the course of politics in New South Wales especially, and Australia in general. He also often appeared as a television show host and enjoyed a long recording career, as well as publishing many books of poetry.

Laws' radio show was broadcast throughout Australia for many years. Laws is also a familiar voice for generations of Australians through work as a voice-over artist for commercials, and as a celebrity endorser of commercial products, including Valvoline motor oil, with his catchphrase "Valvoline, you know what I mean" and Oral-B toothbrushes (the slogan "Oral-B, the toothbrush more dentists use").

=== Early career ===
Laws began his radio career in 1953 at 3BO in Bendigo before working at several other rural radio stations and joining 2UE in 1957, the first of four terms at the Sydney radio station, during which time he became one of the first Australian disc jockeys to play rock 'n' roll music (along with Bob Rogers, Tony Withers and Stan Rofe). Laws pioneered the practice (soon taken up by Rofe) of using contacts in the airline industry to supply him with the latest international pop releases, giving him an edge at a time when Australian releases of many British and American pop records might be delayed for months.

Laws left 2UE in 1959, and moved to the Hunter Valley, where he ran a farm. In the period between 1959 and 1962 Laws worked at both 2HD Newcastle and his first stint at 2SM. The newspaper advertisement for his move to the Sydney station showed him holding a small Mexican puppy. It was during this time he first worked with John Brennan. From 1957 to 1959 on 2UE each of the 3 pop presenters: Laws; Tony Withers and Bob Rogers had shows lasting just half an hour from 5:00pm playing the latest hits. During this time the afternoon newspaper the Daily Mirror ran a story about the imminent death due to cancer of Withers. In truth Withers was running away to Britain to broadcast on the new offshore pirate radio station ships due to his desire to hide his homosexuality, a life style not tolerated sympathetically in Australia at the time. Brennan; Laws and Withers are said to have had the best voices on radio during this period. In 1962, he moved back to Sydney, where he joined 2GB, remaining with the station for two years before he rejoined 2UE in 1964. His stint at 2UE continued until 1969, at which point he contracted to 2UW, where he was to remain for almost 10 years. He returned to 2UE in 1979, this time for another five years. He then moved to 2GB after a highly publicised bid for his services, but returned to the 2UE fold when the station was number eight in the ratings. The return of Laws was the primary cause of the station becoming number one in Sydney for many years. Laws' radio program was syndicated nationwide, and was especially popular in rural areas. Capital city stations taking Laws included 4BC in Brisbane, 2CC in Canberra, 7HOFM in Hobart and Mix 104.9 in Darwin.

In 1983, Communications lecturer Glen Lewis wrote of Laws:

He sets the agenda by complaining vigorously about something, lays down the line for the day, then accepts calls which mostly reflect his own viewpoint... he mostly gets the restatement of cliched views [from callers]... Technically, he foregrounds minority group negative stereotyping in his show. Informally, he specialises in moral crusades against the unrespectable weak – the unemployed, prisoners, homosexuals, anti-nuclear demonstrators – in the name of the upright citizen and honest taxpayer.

=== Television ===
Though best known as a radio host, Laws often worked as a television host and panelist. His early 1960s show Startime assisted in introducing mainstream Australia to Dame Edna Everage at which time Laws claimed Everage was "a very close friend of mine". Laws told columnist Valda Marshall in 1970 that he was 'not basically a TV star' and didn't 'feel altogether happy with the medium'. He was a judge on Australia's New Faces in 1969 and took over as host from Noel Ferrier on the panel advice show Beauty and the Beast in 1970. He also appeared on television in 1970 in an acting role in the children's drama Skippy. Laws quit Beauty and the Beast in 1971; a spokesman for the station which produced the show, Channel 7, claimed Laws had asked for a higher salary. In May 1971, he began hosting a daytime show called His and Hers. In 1982, he hosted a revived Beauty and the Beast for Network 10. In 1998, John Laws – In One Lifetime, a historical documentary program he compered, premiered on Network Ten and LAWS on Foxtel. While LAWS continued until 2000, John Laws – In One Lifetime was dropped after two episodes, although the remaining five episodes commissioned by Network 10 were aired later that year.

=== 21st century and retirements ===
In 2002, station colleague and arch-rival Alan Jones moved from 2UE to 2GB, and soon took that station to the top talk position in Sydney. Laws announced on 25 June 2007 that after 55 years on the air he would retire at the end of the year. However, he was pre-empted by other media agencies, who broke the story at 9:00 am. Laws made the announcement at about 9:10 am, saying that he had planned to make the announcement at about 9:45 am. Laws' last broadcast was on 30 November 2007, one week after the federal election. He began as always, "Hello world, I'm John Laws" and signed off with his usual quote, "you...be kind to each other." He then left the 2UE building in Sydney in his Rolls-Royce Phantom surrounded by hordes of cameramen.

In 2004, Laws and rival talk-back host Alan Jones were accused of taking payment to make favourable comments on products and services under the guise of merely expressing personal opinion, after entering into deals with Telstra. The ABA subsequently found that Laws' deal constituted cash for comment but Jones' did not. Laws, apparently angered by what he saw as inequitable treatment, launched stinging attacks on Jones and the ABA's head, David Flint. In an appearance on the ABC's Enough Rope, Laws accused Jones of placing pressure on Prime Minister John Howard to keep Flint as head of the ABA, and made comments that many viewers took to imply a sexual relationship between Jones and Flint, and broadly hinted that Jones, like Flint, was homosexual.

In November 2004, Laws and 2UE colleague Steve Price were found guilty of vilifying homosexuals after an on-air discussion about a gay couple appearing in the reality TV show The Block. They described the couple as "young poofs". Laws had previously apologised for another incident in which he called gay TV personality Carson Kressley, of Queer Eye for the Straight Guy fame, a "pillow-biter" and a "pompous little pansy prig".

On 17 July 2007, Laws' gold-plated microphone was stolen. The Sennheiser was presented to him by his radio station 2UE management in 2003 to commemorate his 50 years on the air and was said to be worth $10,000. "I'm very upset about it – it's been a part of my life" he told the Daily Telegraph. Laws subsequently switched to another gold plated microphone; a Rode NT2-A presented to him for his 40th anniversary. He promised charges would not be laid if the Sennheiser was returned.

In October 2007, West Coast Eagles player Adam Selwood commenced legal proceedings against Laws over comments made about him regarding a mid-year incident involving Fremantle Football Club player Des Headland.

In December 2007, during a long lunch at Sydney's Otto Ristorante to farewell his former personal assistant, Laws was informed of the presence of rival broadcasters Derryn Hinch and Bob Rogers at another table nearby. He went over to their table and immediately spouted forth a tirade of invective, calling them 'the two most despicable cunts' he'd ever met in the industry. Hinch and Rogers traded insults with Laws, insisting Hinch was a 'hypocrite' and a 'failed alcoholic'. Hinch replied that that must mean Laws was a 'successful one' and that if Laws was not in fact an alcoholic then he was a 'bloody good actor'. Eventually 2UE colleague Mike Carlton convinced Laws to return to his table and Hinch and Rogers were left to laugh off the altercation.

On 7 May 2009, Laws made a statement on the 20th anniversary special edition of the ABC's Media Watch program, in which he exhibited no remorse for his role in the Cash-for-Comment scandal, instead implying that the whistleblower (Media Watch) was the wrongdoer and that the people involved were only jealous of his success.

In August 2009, Laws revealed on Vega that he missed radio and that he was interested in returning to the airwaves. This was followed five months later by an announcement by Laws' manager, revealing that Laws had entered into negotiations with a number of radio stations, including 2SM. Nevertheless, the suggestions that Laws would be returning from retirement in 2010 ended shortly thereafter, when 2UE management revealed that their contract with Laws precluded him from competing with their station until December 2010. Laws' management confirmed in November 2010 that he would be returning to radio, following the expiry of the no-compete clause that prevented him from signing with a new network. On 31 January 2011, Laws debuted in the morning slot on 2SM, presenting the John Laws Morning Show on that station and networked to the Super Radio Network.

On 19 March 2013, Laws interviewed a female listener, who described a history of sexual abuse between the ages of six and sixteen. Laws proceeded to ask the woman if the abuse was in some way her fault and whether she had been provocative. The following day Laws said on air that women who dressed provocatively were once viewed as "rape bait".

In 2015, Laws referred to a male victim of child sexual assault as a "wet blanket" and told him to "brighten up".

In March 2020, Laws addressed on air an email received from a listener which was critical of both Laws and various items of content broadcast on the show. In his response, Laws told the listener "for goodness sake, say something constructive, like you're going to kill yourself." The incident was later investigated by the Australian Communications and Media Authority, who in March 2021 released a report finding Laws had breached two provisions of the Commercial Radio Code of Practice in broadcasting this statement. It also found 2HD (licensee of 2SM) had breached a provision of the same code relating to complaints handling.

Laws announced on 8 October 2024 during a listener message, that after 71 years on the air, and 13 years with 2SM, he would retire from radio on 8 November 2024, for the final time.

== Personal life ==
Laws married three times. His first marriage was to Sonia Zlotkowski in 1956, with whom he had two sons. He then married Yvonne Helstrom-Roux in 1965, though the pair divorced in 1974. Laws' final marriage was to Caroline Hagon in 1976. She died due to cancer in 2020.

=== Death ===
Laws died at his home in Sydney on 9 November 2025, at the age of 90. He had spent two weeks in hospital the previous month, and his death was announced in a family statement the same day.

The Prime Minister of Australia Anthony Albanese expressed his condolences after his death was announced, calling him "an iconic voice and so much more". The Premier of New South Wales Chris Minns stated he was a "towering figure in Australian radio".

== Cultural influence ==
In 1996, a portrait of John Laws by artist Paul Newton won the Packing Room award at the Archibald Prize. The portrait was hung in Laws' production office at 2UE.

Former Australian Prime Minister Paul Keating called him the "broadcaster of the century" at Laws 40th anniversary dinner. At the ARIA Music Awards of 2008 he was presented with a Lifetime Achievement Award.

He is referenced in multiple songs by Australian artists, including "Who Can Stand in the Way?" by Midnight Oil ("Well oh well I feel I'm in decay / John Laws is on the air again") and "Five Yards" by TISM (You're only one station from John Laws' shit, You're only one lobotomy from believing it).

== Poetry and non-fiction ==
Laws authored numerous books, many of them poetry collections. He claimed in 1970 that he had been reading Rod McKuen's poems on air but at one point, realising he had left his copy of McKuen's book at home, he instead read a poem of his own and "it seemed to go over pretty well." The working title for his first book was Poems that Came to Me in the Night When No-one Else Would. His Book of Irreverent Logic and his Book of Uncommon Sense were republished together in 1996 as A John Laws Limited Edition. His most recent work is a memoir. His books include:

- In love is an expensive place to die : poems (Paul Hamlyn, 1971)
- Results of Love (Hamlyn, 1972)
- Calendar Collection (Summit, 1978)
- Just You and Me Together, Love: Poems (Hamlyn, 1978)
- Somewhere Remembering (Angus & Robertson, 1984)
- John Laws' Book of Irreverent Logic (Pan Australia, 1994)
- John Laws' Book of Uncommon Sense (Pan Macmillan, 1995)
- John Laws' Barbecue Cook Book (Pan Macmillan, 1996)
- It Doesn't End There: Great Australian Stories With a Twist (with Christopher Stewart) (Pan Macmillan, 2006)
- There's Always More to the Story (with Christopher Stewart) (Pan Macmillan, 2006)
- Lawsie : well ... you wanted to know (New Holland, 2017)

== Filmography ==
=== Film ===
- Ned Kelly (1970) – Kennedy
- Nickel Queen (1971) – Claude Fitzherbert
- The Magic Pudding (2000) – Rumpus Bumpus

== Discography ==
Laws recorded nine singles between 1959 and 1962, including many songs he wrote himself. He recorded eight solo albums in the 1970s. His first three LPs and the seventh, You've Never Been Trucked Like This Before, are primarily covers of country and middle of the road hits; the fourth, The Mind and the Music, was made up of original Laws songs. In Love is an Expensive Place to Die is an album of Laws' poetry set to music. You Must Remember This is a collection of standards from the forties with one song co-written by Laws.

Additionally, Laws appears recorded as part of the cast of Side By Side By Sondheim (RCA Red Seal, 1977) and reading his poems to accompaniment by the Henry Mancini Orchestra on an album entitled Just You and Me Together, Love (RCA, 1977). A Tribute to the ANZACS (Southland, 2000) is a 'musical documentary' narrated by Laws.

=== Studio albums ===
List of albums, with Australian chart positions
Title	Album details	Peak chart positions
Title	Album details	AUS
Rollin' Free	Released: 1971; Format: LP; Label: His Master's Voice (SOELP-9765)	-
Motivatin' Man	Released: 1971; Format: LP; Label: RCA Victor (SL-101975)	-
Rocks in M' Pocket and Dirt in M' Shoes	Released: August 1972; Format: LP; Label: RCA Victor (SP-114-G)	25
The Mind and the Music	Released: 1973; Format: LP; Label: RCA Victor (SP-125-G)	-
Let Him Roll	Released: 1975; Format: LP; Label: RCA Victor (SP-154-G)	-
You've Never Been Trucked Like This Before	Released: July 1976; Format: LP; Label: RCA Victor (VPL1-0121)	69
In Love Is an Expensive Place to Die	Released: 1976; Format: LP; Label: Ultimat (ULP-2002)	-
You Must Remember This	Released: August 1977; Format: LP; Label: RCA Victor (VPL1-0147)	91
Just You and Me Together Love (with Henry Mancini)	Released: 1977; Format: LP; Label: RCA (PL 12362)	-
A Tribute to the Anzacs	Released: 2000; Format: CD; Label: Southland Music Distribution (SLM736CD)	-

=== Compilation albums ===
List of albums, with Australian chart positions
Title	Album details	Peak chart positions
Title	Album details	AUS
John Laws	Released: 1973; Format: LP; Label: RCA Australia (VCL1-0029)	-
For No Reason at All	Released: June 1981; Format: LP; Label: J&B Records (JB074)	95

=== Charting singles ===
List of singles, with Australian chart positions
Year	Title	Peak chart positions
Year	Title	AUS
1972	"No Name"/"Daddy, Don't You Walk So Fast"	37
1975	"And Yet and Yet"	99

== Awards and honours ==
Laws was appointed an Officer of the Order of the British Empire (OBE) in the 1974 New Year Honours for services to broadcasting; he was promoted to Commander of the Order of the British Empire (CBE) in the 1978 Birthday Honours, for services to broadcasting and to charity.

=== Australian Record Awards ===
Year	Nominee / work	Award	Result
1975	Let Him Roll	Country Music Album of the Year	Won

=== Mo Awards ===
The Australian Entertainment Mo Awards (commonly known informally as the Mo Awards), were annual Australian entertainment industry awards. They recognised achievements in live entertainment in Australia from 1975 to 2016.

Year	Nominee / work	Award	Result (wins only)
1998	John Laws	John Campbell Fellowship Award	Won
