= FM104.7 (Grafton) =

Radio station in Grafton, Australia

FM104.7 (2CLR)
- Grafton, New South Wales; Australia
- Broadcast area: Grafton RA2
- Frequency: FM: 104.7 MHz
- Branding: The Best From the 80s till Now

Programming
- Format: Hot adult contemporary
- Network: Super Radio Network

Ownership
- Owner: Broadcast Operations Group
- Operator: Super Radio Network
- Sister stations: 2GF

History
- First air date: 3 February 1997; 29 years ago
- Call sign meaning: 2 for New South Wales plus CLR for the Clarence River

Technical information
- Licensing authority: ACMA
- ERP: 20,000 watts
- Transmitter coordinates: 29.489325°S 153.171289°E

Links
- Public licence information: Profile
- Website: 1047fm.au

FM104.7 (official callsign: 2CLR) is a commercial radio station in Grafton, New South Wales, owned by the Super Radio Network.

== History ==
FM104.7 commenced broadcasting on 3 February 1997, as a counterpart to sister station 2GF. Since its inception, it has had a Hot Adult Contemporary format, with local news, information, and community programs. Over the years, notable announcers include Paul Covington and Brandon Disson.

== Current shows ==
Current shows broadcast on FM104.7 include:

- The Wake Up with Tess (6-10am weekdays)
- Drive Home with Cam (2-5pm weekdays)
- Will and Woody (5-7pm weekdays)
- Fresh Nights with Matty (7pm-11pm Monday-Thursday)
