= Barney (film) =

1976 Australian film by David Waddington

- Directed by: David Waddington
- Written by: Colin Drake
- Produced by: David Waddington
- Starring: Brett Maxworthy; Sean Kramer; Lionel Long; Spike Milligan
- Cinematography: Richard Wallace
- Edited by: Rod Hay
- Music by: Tommy Tycho
- Production company: Columbia Pictures
- Distributed by: Columbia Pictures
- Release date: 16 December 1976
- Running time: 93 minutes
- Country: Australia
- Language: English
- Budget: A$230,000 or $257,842

Barney is a 1976 Australian children's film set during the Convict Era. A 12-year-old boy and a convict are shipwrecked together. It was also known as Lost in the Wild.

== Plot ==
In the 1880s, a small boy called Barney, a wombat called Amanda and an Irish convict called Rafe are the sole survivors of a shipwreck. They head off to Ballarat together to find Barney's father. On the way two gypsy woman drug Rafe and try to steal Barney's money. Rafe is wrongly accused of horse theft and he is imprisoned, but Barney helps him escape. Barney is eventually reunited with his father.

== Cast ==
- Brett Maxworthy as Barney Dawson
- Sean Kramer as Rafe Duggan
- Lionel Long as Charles Dawson
- Spike Milligan as Hawker
- Jack Allen as Sergeant

== Production ==
The budget was provided by Columbia Pictures and Australian Film Commission. Shooting began in May 1976 on the New South Wales coast and at the Australiana Pioneer Village at Wilberforce.

== Release ==
Despite the involvement of a Hollywood studio, commercial results were disappointing in Australia. However it performed better in Hong Kong and Japan.
