= Hill FM =

2HIL
Broken Hill, New South Wales, Australia; Australia
- Broadcast area: Broken Hill RA1
- Frequency: 96.5 MHz FM
- Branding: Hill FM

Programming
- Language: English
- Format: Top 40 (CHR)

Ownership
- Owner: Broadcast Operations Pty Ltd; (Super Hill 106 FM Pty Ltd)
- Sister stations: 2BH

History
- First air date: 19 January 1993

Technical information
- ERP: 4,000 watts
- HAAT: 71 m
- Transmitter coordinates: 31°56′23″S 141°26′36″E

Links
- Website: Official website

2HIL, branded on-air as Hill FM, is an Australian radio station owned by the Super Radio Network. The station serves Broken Hill, New South Wales, and has a reach of about 70 km outside of Broken Hill.

Hill FM 96.5 have a Facebook page and Instagram account.

== Previous Staff and Announcers ==
- Amy Casey
- Phil Spurr
- Riley Phelan
- Steve Baker (PD: 1996–2004)
- Jonothan Wright (PD: 1993–1996)
- Vashti Stewart
- Tod Campbell
- Pat Gurry
- Seranna Shutt
- Rockin' Richie Daniel
- Jason "Milton" Lee
- Damien "the Fish" Fisher
- Cameron Sullings
- David Illiffe
- Andrew Andrews "Zorba"
- Dave "Davey Damaged" McLennan
- Jenny Robertson
- Michael Cetinich
- Brenton "Thommo" Thompson
- Chris Hutton
- Michael Taafe
- Andrew "AD" Doman
- Talissa "Tali" Eley
- Ophelia "Opho" Standley-Thompson
- Daniel "Dan" Howden
- Greg "Sexy Greg" Magnus
- Stan "The platter man" Harris
- Vicki "vinyl" Johnson
- John "Parrot" Birdmen
- Brett "Combat" Small
- Kooka and the Wombat's Animal Farm in the Morning.
- Rocky Renalds
- Stephen Monro
- Barry Baxter

== Awards and nominations ==
Jonothan Wright won best Program Director category RAWARD for his work at Hill FM.

Steve Baker and Riley Phelan were finalists in "Best On-air Team" for "The Morning Mix with Steve & Riley" over the 1996–1997 period in the RAWARDS.

== History of the Station ==
Sister station (supplementary Licence) for 2BH in Broken Hill NSW

Originally broadcast on the 106.9 FM frequency until a transmitter upgrade and power increase moved the station to 96.5. It was broadcasting on both frequencies during a 12-month transition, and still can be heard on 106.9 within a 2 km radius of the station..

Founding Owner - Far West Radio Pty Ltd owned by David Tunkin and John Curtis

The launch of the station in 1993 saw a large parade in the main street of Broken Hill to a soundtrack highlighting the new sound of the FM station using the slogan "Putting the Rock back in the Hill" a reference to the mining history of Broken Hill.

During the first few years of the station, the Friday Night "Coca-Cola Request Line" was a popular program with live callers answering a topical question and requesting their favourite songs with a weekly prize from the sponsor given out at the end of each show. The theme music for the show introduction was the Theme to Beverly Hills, 90210 as this was the popular show of the time with the audience.

The station was one of the first in Australia to be run under Automation using a system called "Systemation" designed in the US and used exclusively in Australia by Far West Radio Pty Ltd. The hardware was operated by a Commodore 64 computer and serial ports and consisted of a hard disk DOS program to play "Voice tracks" and commercials and a rack of up to 14 Super VHS 4 track players that contained 4 stereo tracks on a 240-minute tape, the tapes for each category were changed daily to "rotate" the playlist. Current Hit back announces and a dedicated "time call" deck was also in the system to play at pre-programmed times. Eventually the video tape players were replaced with hard disk recorded music using a software program called "SALSA" which was DOS based and could only record in real time, but this places all music, voice tracks, commercials, and long form programs, satellite feeds via the one computer (in 1994 it was a Pentium 90 machine with 256 mg of RAM). This machine was affectionately known by the staff as "Cyril".

In the late 1990s the station used a unique Promotional Prize car, especially for Broken Hill, it had a red "Purvis Eureka" Kit car, which was a fiberglass Ferrari style body on a VW chassis and mechanicals, whilst it always drew a lot of attention from listeners when making appearances, due to its pop up roof with no doors, some was unwarranted especially when it suffered the 40-degree summer days in Broken Hill, which was not kind to the rear air-cooled engine. The vehicle participated in the local "Pro Hart's Rally for SIDS" with Jonathan Wright and Steve Baker dressed as Batman and Robin participating in the fund raiser for raising money for SIDS (sudden infant death syndrome) and receiving a special hand painted PRO HART painted trophy for participating.

Throughout the 90s and early 2000s networked shows including Take 40 Australia with Barry Bissell, Rock 40 Countdown with Mike Hammond, Party Hard with Ugly Phil O'Neill, were all aired. Locally produced on air features included: 9@9 workday kickstart, Midday Mini Concert, 80s lunchbox, Club Retro with Steve Baker, The Hot 8 at 8 nightly countdown, Double shot Thursdays were all part of the early days of the station with a local pizza store giving away free pizza party lunches every day as part of a mornings request show where listeners faxed the station with their requests which were read on air ( a 90s version of digital interaction).
