= The Tweed Daily =

Australian daily newspaper

The Tweed Daily was a daily English language newspaper published in Murwillumbah, New South Wales, Australia from 1914 to 1949. It was also published as the Tweed and Brunswick Advocate and Southern Queensland Record, Tweed and Brunswick Advocate, Tweed Times and Brunswick Advocate, Tweed Herald and Brunswick Chronicle, Tweed and South Coast Daily, The Daily News, Tweed and Gold Coast Daily News, and the Tweed Daily News.

The Tweed Daily, 1 January 1914

== History ==
The first edition of the Tweed and Brunswick Advocate and Southern Queensland Record was published by William Robert Baker on 31 October 1888. On 13 May 1903, it was renamed the Tweed and Brunswick Advocate, published by John William Kilner. On 26 July 1905, publisher P.W. Tarlinton renamed it the Tweed Times and Brunswick Advocate, also known as the Tweed Times. In July 1893 George Niklin started publishing the Tweed Herald and Brunswick Chronicle, also known as the Tweed Herald. On 1 January 1914, the first edition of The Tweed Daily was published; this incorporated the Tweed Herald and the Tweed Times.

The Tweed Daily was replaced by the Tweed and South Coast Daily on 18 April 1949, which was then continued by The Daily News, on 1 July 1957, with W.T.K Baird as publisher. On 1 November 1986, the Tweed Newspaper Company commenced publication of the Tweed and Gold Coast Daily News, which split into the Tweed Daily News and the Gold Coast News in 1989. The Tweed Daily News changed its name to the Daily News in 1993, then to the Tweed Daily News in 2007. In 2011 it changed back to the Daily News, also published as the Daily News: Tweed, Murwillumbah and Southern Gold Coast. In 2014, the name changed to the Tweed Daily News and it became available online.

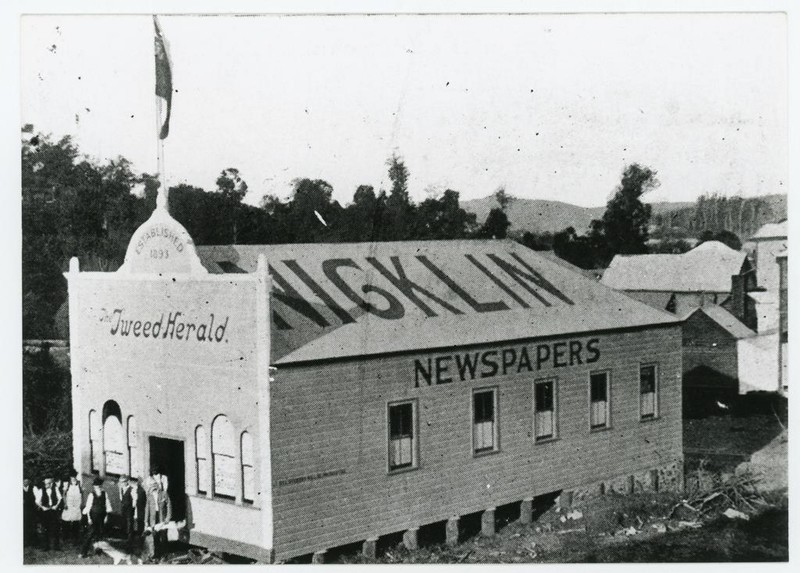
The Tweed Herald office, circa 1900.

== Digitisation ==
This paper has been digitised as part of the Australian Newspapers Digitisation Program project hosted by the National Library of Australia.

== See also ==
- List of newspapers in Australia
- List of newspapers in New South Wales
