= New FM =

Radio station in Newcastle, Australia

NEW FM
- Newcastle; Australia
- Frequency: 105.3 MHz

Programming
- Format: Hot Adult Contemporary

Ownership
- Owner: Broadcast Operations Group; (Newcastle FM Pty Ltd)
- Sister stations: 2HD

History
- First air date: 14 April 1989; 37 years ago
- Call sign meaning: 2 NEWcastle

Technical information
- Power: 20kw
- Transmitter coordinates: -32.8911° latitude and 151.53812° longitude

Links
- Website: newfm.com.au

NEWFM (call sign: 2NEW) is an Australian radio station, licensed to, and serving Newcastle and its surrounding area. It is owned by Bill Caralis's Broadcast Operations Group, and operates at 105.3 megahertz on the FM band from Radio Centre at Sandgate. Great Mt Sugarloaf houses the transmitter site. Its callsign is 2NEW, the 2 being a standard prefix for stations in New South Wales, and NEW short for Newcastle. Its sister station is 2HD. On 24 May 2005, NEWFM reverted to its original 1989 logo which has since been modernised.

A key point of difference between NEWFM and the other Newcastle radio stations is that all shows originate and are broadcast from the local region, there is no networking, the station is 100% Newcastle made.

== History ==
NEWFM was the first commercial FM radio station in Newcastle, founded by Mike Webb. It commenced broadcasting on 14 April 1989, with the AC/DC song It's a Long Way to the Top (If You Wanna Rock 'n' Roll). The station officially launched on 6 May of that year, accompanied by pyrotechnics and laser technology on the Newcastle Foreshore, the event dubbed 'Skynova'.

In its first ratings survey, the station achieved a ratings share of 24.7%.

In 1994, Labour–owned 2HD bought out the station's shareholders for $2.3 million. In March 1999, both radio stations (2HD and NEW-FM) were sold to Bill Caralis's Broadcast Operations Group, for $12.5 million.

In 2008 NEWFM became the Hub of the Super Network FM Stations (NEWFM Network) supplying programming from its Sandgate based studios to stations from the New South Wales/Victorian border in the south, north to the Sunshine Coast and Whitsundays in Queensland and West to Broken Hill and Alice Springs.

== On-Air Team ==
Monday to Friday

- 5 am to 9 am – Nic and Joel in the Morning (Nicole Somerville & Joel Gosper)
- 9 am to 10.45 am – 105 Minutes Commercial Free
- 11 am to 3 pm – Dave Wright
- 3 pm to 7 pm – Ari & Krivo (Ariana Gatti & Mark Krivo)
- 7 pm to 11 pm – NEWFM at Night (Matt Morris)
- 11 pm to Midnight – Homegrown
- Friday 7 pm to Midnight - NEWFM Party Mix

== Key Staff ==
- Guy Ashford – General/Sales Manager
- Luke Hetherington – Promotions & Marketing Director/ Operations
- Joel Thomson – NEWFM Content Director
- Michael Blaxland – News Director
- Nat Wilson – Music Team
- Ross McClymont – Broadcast Engineer/ Technology

== See also ==
- List of radio stations in Australia
