= Far West (New South Wales) =

- Region
- Coordinates: 31°57′24″S 141°28′04″E
- Country: Australia
- State: New South Wales
- LGA: City of Broken Hill; Central Darling Shire; Unincorporated Far West

Government
  - State electorates: Barwon; Murray
  - Federal divisions: Parkes; Farrer

Area
  - Total: 146,981 km^{2} (56,750 sq mi)

Population
  - Total: 44,917 (2016 census) (Note: Population figure is the combined population of all LGAs in the region and includes the Unincorporated Far West Region.)
  - Density: 0.305597/km^{2} (0.791493/sq mi)
Regions around Far West
Far North	South West Queensland	North West Slopes
Far North	Far West	Orana, Central West
Murray and Mallee	Murray	Riverina

The Far West region of New South Wales, Australia refers generally to the western part of the state, which is too dry to support wheat or other crops or intensive pastoral endeavours. It is west of the North West Slopes, Central West and the Riverina. It is an area with limited rainfall. The only major rivers found in it are the Darling River and the Murray River (on its southern edge), which originate in the Great Dividing Range to the east. The region corresponds to the combination of the Australian Bureau of Meteorology's forecast areas of Upper Western and Lower Western. It also corresponds to the Western Division established under the New South Wales Western Lands Act 1901.

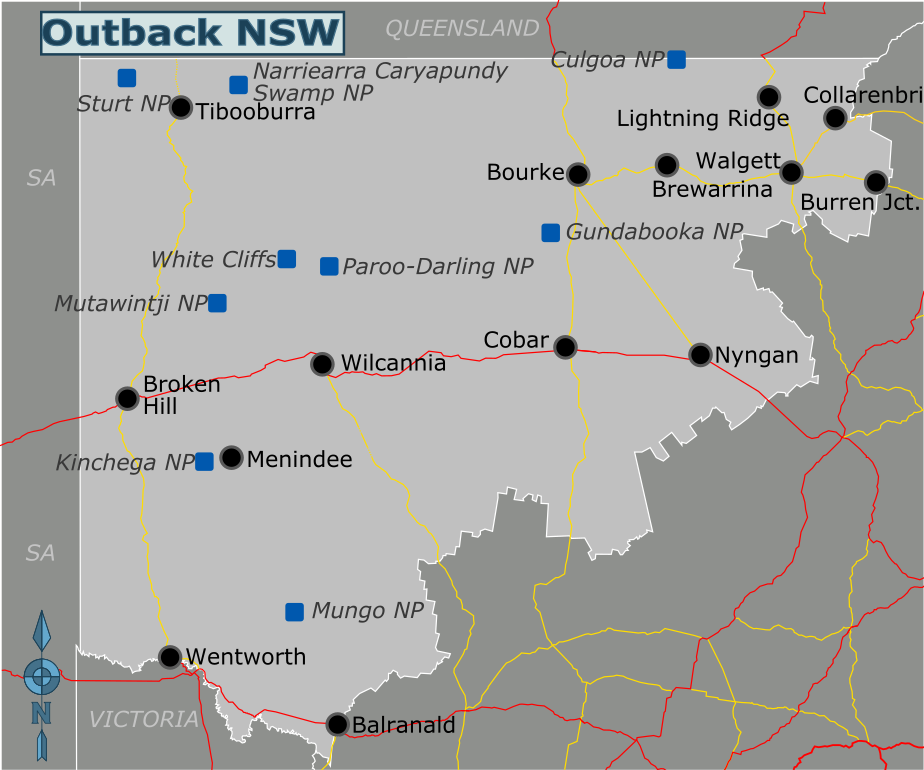
Map of Far West New South Wales

The only city in the Far West is Broken Hill. Other significant towns are Bourke, Brewarrina, Cobar, Ivanhoe and Wentworth.

Ninety-five per cent of the region is uncleared. Major economic activities are mining and extensive pasturing. During good seasons in the 1870s and 1880s, large sheep stations were established with high stocking rates, partly in response to a widespread belief that the introduction of agriculture would result in climate change toward European conditions. The error of this "rain follows the plough" concept was exposed by the droughts of the 1890s. Many of the stations established during this period failed and were subsequently abandoned.

The Far West region is traversed by the Barrier Highway, the Silver City Highway, the Mitchell Highway, the Cobb Highway and the Sturt Highway. It is also served by the Sydney-Perth Railway.

The region is served by Broken Hill Airport which provides air routes to Sydney, Adelaide, and Dubbo operated by Rex Airlines and QantasLink.

== Media ==
=== Radio ===
The region is served by these radio stations:

- ABC Broken Hill part of ABC Local Radio (regional)
- 2BH (commercial)
- Hill FM (commercial)
- 2DRY FM (community)

=== Television ===
Although Broken Hill is in New South Wales, the programming schedules for these channels (excluding the ABC) is the same as those of Nine, Ten and Seven in Adelaide, with local adverts inserted and some variations for coverage of Australian Football League or National Rugby League matches, local and national news and current affairs programs, some lifestyle and light entertainment shows and infomercials. This is because Broken Hill, unlike the rest of New South Wales, uses Australian Central Standard Time. ABC channels are relayed from Sydney, which is on Eastern Standard Time, so all programming is a half-hour earlier than advertised.

== See also ==
- Regions of New South Wales
