= Broadcast Operations Group =

Australian media company

- Type: Private
- Industry: Radio broadcasting
- Founder: Bill Caralis
- Headquarters: Australia
- Key people: Graham Mott (CEO); Graham Miles (GM)
- Owner: George Caralis; Despina Priala
- Number of employees: 200 (2026)
- Website: srnradio.com.au

Broadcast Operations Group is an Australian media company, operating radio stations across various centres across regional New South Wales and Queensland, Australia. Branded as the Super Radio Network, stations carry one of two formats; a news talk and classic hits format based at 2SM in Sydney and a hot adult contemporary format based at New FM in Newcastle.

In June 2019, the Group acquired 2BS and B-Rock FM in Bathurst from local proprietors Ron and Stephanie Camplin. 2BS immediately replaced its broadcast of The Ray Hadley Morning Show with The John Laws Show, syndicated from 2SM.

On 19 July 2024, founder and owner Bill Caralis died as a result of a heart attack at the age of 81.

In December 2024, the company expanded again, taking over the stations of Coastal Broadcasters in Far North Queensland.

In October 2025, Super Radio Network announced the appointment of its inaugural CEO, Rhys Holleran. After a short stint at CEO, Holleran resigned in March 2026, with Graham Mott named as his successor.

In September 2026 after months of speculation, the group announced that the network was up for sale, including all Radio Stations, as well as studio's/buildings that are fully owned.

== Radio stations ==
As of March 2026, Broadcast Operations Group operated 47 radio stations.

- 2AD 1134 Armidale
- 2BH 567 Broken Hill
- 2BS 95.1 Bathurst
- 2DU 1251 Dubbo, 972 Cobar
- 2EL 1089 Orange
- 2GF 89.5 Grafton
- 2HC 639 Coffs Harbour (also on 100.5 FM)
- 2HD 1143 Newcastle, 97.5 FM Port Stephens, 90.5 FM Lake Macquarie
- 2LF 1350 Young, 105.3 Cootamundra, 100.7 Cowra, 100.7 Grenfell, 104.9 Harden, 104.9 Temora
- 2LM 900 Lismore, 104.3 Kyogle
- 2MG 97.1 Mudgee, 101.5 Kandos
- 2MO 1080 Gunnedah, 103.3 Coonabarabran
- 2NZ 1188 Inverell
- 2PK 1404 Parkes
- 2RE 88.9 Taree
- 2SM 1269 Sydney
- TMFM 95.5 Tamworth
- 2VM 1530 Moree/Narrabri, 89.5 Goondiwindi, 92.9 Lightning Ridge, 103.5 Collarenebri, 106.7 Walgett, 105.5 Mungindi
- 4GY 558 Gympie, 107.1 Noosa Heads
- 4AK 1242 Oakey/Toowoomba, 99.5 Stanthorpe
- Cruze FM 531 Kempsey, 93.5 Port Macquarie
- Radio 97 972 Murwillumbah, 103.5 Mullumbimby, 104.1 Currumbin

A further 16 stations form the FM network, broadcast mainly on FM radio with adult contemporary music and syndicated programming:

- 4WK 963 Warwick, 95.5 Toowoomba, 91.5 Stanthorpe, 95.9 Dalby
- B-Rock 99.3 Bathurst
- FM92.9 Tamworth
- FM100.3 Armidale
- FM104.7 Grafton
- Gem FM 95.1 Inverell
- Hill FM 96.5 Broken Hill
- Max FM 107.3 Taree
- New FM 105.3 Newcastle
- Now FM 98.3 Moree/Narrabri, 88.7 Goondiwindi, 91.3 Lightning Ridge, 101.9 Collarenebri, 105.1 Walgett, 101.7 Mungindi
- Real FM 93.1 Mudgee
- Roccy FM 93.9 Young
- The Rok 95.5 Parkes
- Triple G 97.5 Gunnedah
- Zoo FM 92.7 Dubbo
- ZZZ FM 100.9 Lismore

In addition, the group broadcasts four stations on DAB+ digital radio in Sydney, alongside simulcasting 2SM:

- Fun Super Digi, playing classic hits music
- Dance Super Digi, playing 1990s and 2000s dance music
- Gorilla Radio, playing electronic dance music
- Zoo Super Digi, playing adult contemporary music

Finally, the Group owns 8 stations in Alice Springs and Far North Queensland, which have not yet been placed in to either Super Radio Network feed.

- 8HA 900 Alice Springs, 100.5 Yulara, running mostly adult contemporary, while taking overnight talk from the AM Network.
- Sun FM 96.9 Alice Springs, running a Contemporary hit radio format.
- Tourist Gold 98.7 Alice Springs, running a mixture of tourist information and classic hits.
- 4KZ 531 Innisfail, 94.7 Cardwell, 90.3 Tully, 102.5 North Innisfail, 1611 Gulf of Carpentaria, running a full service format.
- Kool FM 98.3 Innisfail, 94.9 Babinda, 94.9 Bramston Beach, 91.9 Cardwell, running hot adult contemporary
- 4AY 873 Innisfail, running country music
- 4AM 558 Mareeba, 1422 Port Douglas, 91.3 Ravenshoe, running a full service format.
- Kik FM 88.7 Mareeba, 87.6 Ravenshoe, 88.0 Normanton, 88.0 Croydon, running country music

== Controversy ==
=== Senate Inquiry ===
The BOG was cited in several instances during a Senate Inquiry into Regional Radio. There had been concerns raised as to loss of localism due to networking of radio stations. Bill Caralis was asked to appear several times at various hearings around the country, but never attended.Contents

=== Local Content ===
In October 2009, Broadcast Operations Group was named by the ABC's Media Watch program for failing to provide sufficient local content as stipulated by its Australian Communications & Media Authority (ACMA) licence conditions. Media Watch identified three stations; 2HC Coffs Harbour, 2EL Orange and Radio 531 Port Macquarie, which all took the Grant Goldman breakfast show feed out of 2SM in Sydney and failed to meet local content conditions. In response to enquiries by Media Watch, Caralis stated that he believed local news, weather and community announcements played during the Grant Goldman program was sufficient to meet ACMA's licence conditions. As a result, ACMA launched an investigation into the matter. As of November 2009, this investigation was ongoing, however, as of 30 November 2009, the three aforementioned stations commenced broadcasting a three-hour locally produced program from 12 pm weekdays.

=== Underpayment of staff ===
Broadcast Operations Group has often been accused of a reluctance to pay experienced staff to cut operating costs.

In September 2009, Broadcast Operations Group was found to have underpaid a journalist and has been ordered to make a $10,000 back payment. The journalist, who was studying communications at a Gold Coast university, worked part-time over a two-year period in the newsroom for Tweed Heads radio station Radio 97 was graded as a cadet. The Fair Work Ombudsman found that the Journalist was performing tasks that would normally be given to a Grade 1, Band 1 journalist under the Commercial Radio Journalists Award.
