= Glamour Camp =

US musical group

Glamour Camp was a short-lived American pop/rock musical project fronted by Christopher Otcasek, the son of the Cars' Ric Ocasek (Otcasek is the original spelling of their surname).

Otcasek obtained a recording contract with EMI Records, who released their self-titled debut album, produced by Jonathan Elias, in 1988. Though nominally a band, Glamour Camp was essentially a solo project for Otcasek, with many performances on the album played by hired session musicians, including Will Lee and Sid McGinnis of David Letterman's house band, and drummer Andy Newmark. The single, “She Did It”, was first released in 1988, and the video received some light play on MTV, but never caught on; EMI re-released it the next year as "She Did It for Love", but it again failed to make any commercial impact. Although the Glamour Camp name was discontinued within a year, Otcasek remained under contract to EMI, which further resulted in his solo appearance on the soundtrack to Pretty Woman with a cover of Johnny O'Keefe's "Wild One", done in the style of Iggy Pop's 1986 cover, "Real Wild Child (Wild One)".
