= 2BS 95.1 FM =

Radio station in Bathurst, New South Wales

Coordinates: 33.4157°S 149.5793°E

2BS
- Bathurst, New South Wales, Australia; Australia
- Frequency: 95.1 MHz FM
- Branding: 2BS 95.1 FM

Ownership
- Owner: Broadcast Operations Group; (Bathurst Broadcasters Pty Ltd)
- Sister stations: B-Rock 99.3FM

History
- First air date: 1 January 1937
- Call sign meaning: 2 – New South Wales; BathurSt

Technical information
- Class: Commercial
- Power: 8 kilowatts

Links
- Website: 2bs.com.au

2BS is an Australian commercial radio station broadcasting to the Central Tablelands of New South Wales. Owned and operated by Broadcast Operations Group, the station broadcasts a news talk and classic hits music format with local programming presented from studios in Bathurst.

For close to fifty years, the station was operated by local proprietors Ron and Stephanie Camplin, and was previously owned by the London Times Mirror and Australian Consolidated Press. In June 2019, 2BS and its sister station B-Rock FM were sold to the Broadcast Operations Group, owned by Bill Caralis.

== History ==
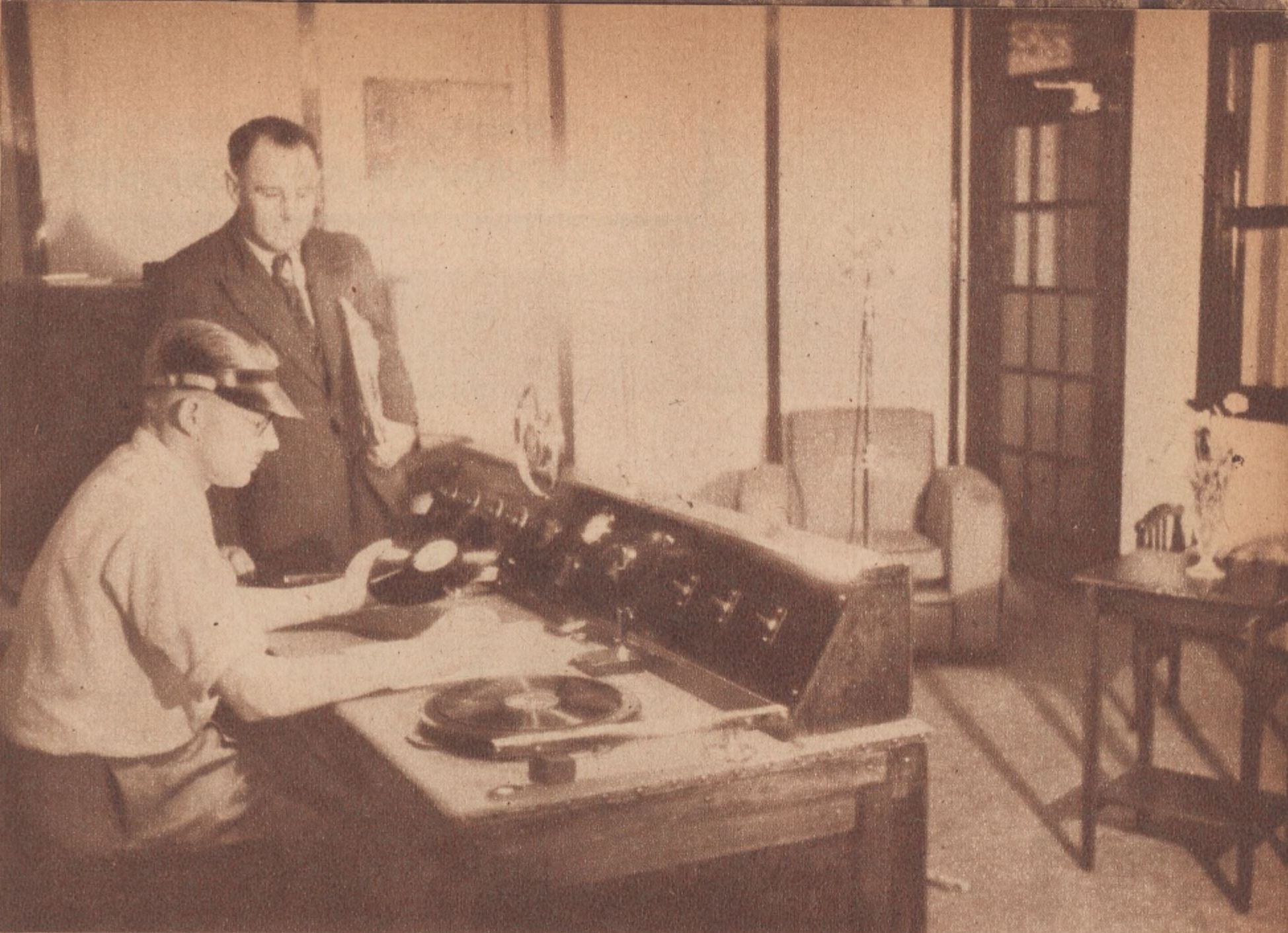
Photograph of 2BS Bathurst studio and staff on opening day

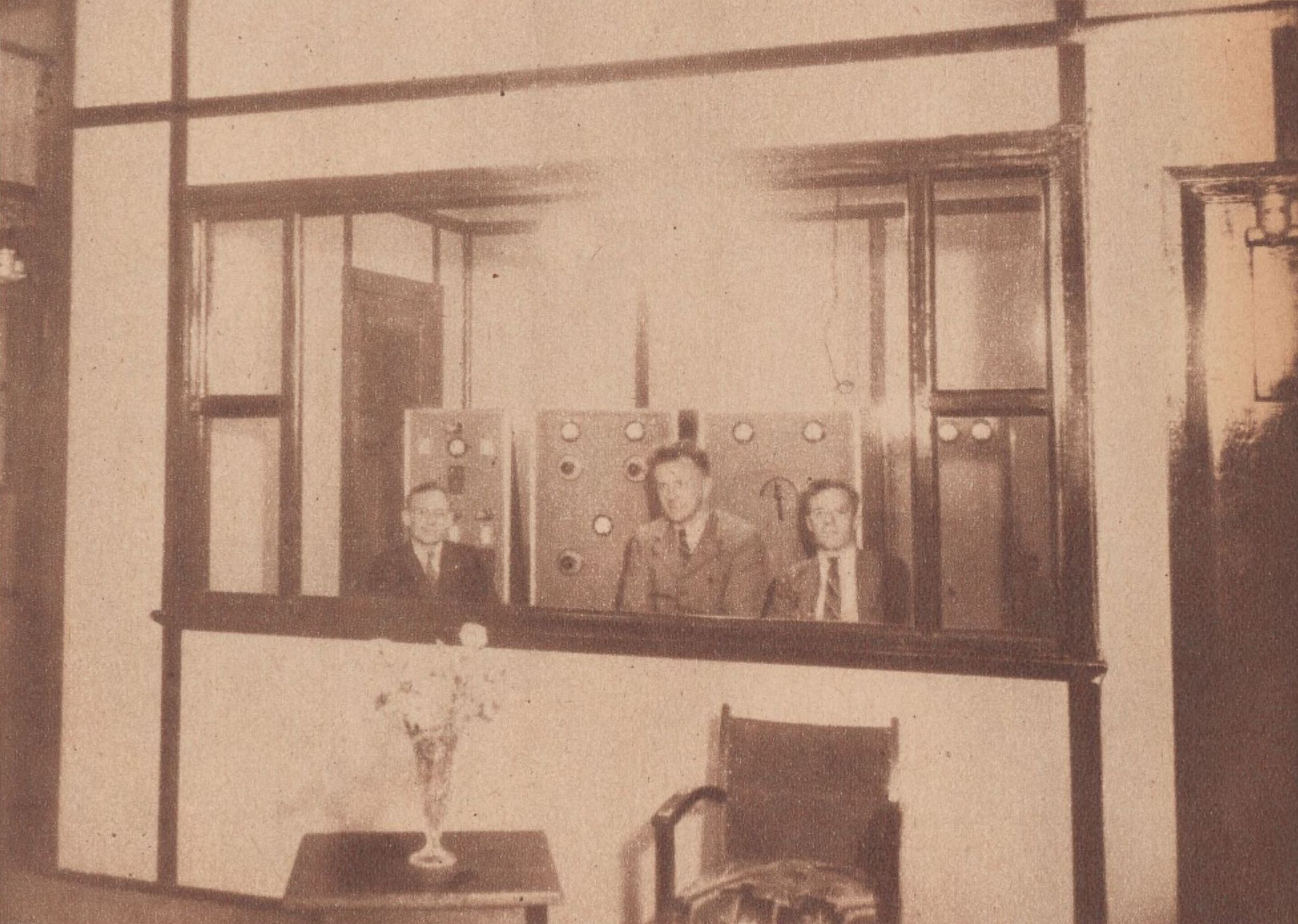
Radio 2BS transmitter and staff on opening day of 1 January 1937

The station began broadcasting on 1 January 1937. Prior to that, a station owned by the Mockler Brothers, with the call sign 2MK, had existed in Bathurst, first broadcasting on 31 October 1925. 2BS was not always the intended call sign - 2BX was also considered. A station located at Meadow Lane, which was to serve both Bathurst and Lithgow, was also projected to start in 1925 with the call letters 2LE. That station never eventuated.

In the 1950s, it was discovered that 2BS's signal was interfering at night with the signal of Melbourne station 3AK. That forced 3AK to become a daytime-only station, having previously been an overnight station. The problem was fixed in the 1960s by switching to directional antennas, which led to 3AK commencing 24-hour transmission. At that time, Australian Consolidated Press (ACP) owned both stations. In 1969, ACP sold 2BS to Ron Camplin, who owned the station until mid 2019.

2BS is an adult contemporary station with a prime target audience of 25+, playing music from the 1950s onwards. Its Breakfast and Drive programs are produced locally, with other programs being networked: John Laws, John Stanley, and the Continuous Call Team from 2GB Sydney.

2BS recently opened FM repeater stations in the surrounding towns of Blayney, Oberon and Sofala.

While 2BS has been promoting itself as a rarity being one of the few remaining locally owned commercial broadcasters in Australia, however radio industry website Radioinfo sources say a sale of 2BS and BRock Bathurst was imminent in 2018. In June 2019, the Camplins sold Bathurst Broadcasters to the Bill Caralis-owned Broadcast Operations Group, which holds the license of 2EL in the adjacent radio market of Orange.

== See also ==
- List of radio stations in Australia
