= B-Rock 99.3FM =

B-Rock 99.3FM (2BXS)
- Bathurst, New South Wales; Australia
- Broadcast area: Bathurst RA1
- Frequency: 99.3 MHz

Ownership
- Owner: Broadcast Operations Group; (Bathurst Broadcasters Pty Ltd)
- Sister stations: 1503 2BS Gold

History
- First air date: 2 December 1996
- Call sign meaning: 2 for New South Wales; variation of call sign of sister station 2BS

Technical information
- Licensing authority: ACMA
- ERP: 10 kilowatts
- Transmitter coordinates: 33°24′58″S 149°34′46″E

Links
- Public licence information: Profile
- Website: www.brockfm.com.au

B-Rock 99.3FM (call sign 2BXS) is a local radio station in Bathurst, New South Wales, Australia. It broadcasts on 99.3 megahertz on the FM band, from a transmitter in Bathurst, with a power output of 10 kilowatts (10,000 watts) and callsign 2BXS.

Its on-air name, B-Rock, is named for Australian motor racing legend (and nine-time Bathurst 1000 winner) Peter Brock.

It is owned by Bathurst Broadcasters Pty. Ltd., a privately held company, owned by Bill Caralis's Broadcast Operations Group, who also owns sister station 2BS Bathurst.

It began broadcasting on 2 December 1996, as a supplementary FM license in the Bathurst district.

B-Rock's format was hot adult contemporary (rock), with a core audience of up to 39 years. Its programs are produced locally, and features competitions, comedy, requests and national news which airs on the hour from 7 am to 5 pm Monday to Friday.

In January 2025, BOG changed the format of B-Rock to Top 40 (CHR) in an attempt to appeal to a wider audience, particularly younger listeners. In a statement on Facebook, B-Rock stated that the Rock format had become niche in many Australian markets. Any rock music played on B-Rock now mostly comes from BOG's 80s to Now music log, which is also heard on stations like NEW FM 105.3 Newcastle and Roccy FM 93.9 Young.

== See also ==
- List of radio stations in Australia
