= Sing, Sing, Sing (TV series) =

Australian TV series (1962–1965)

- Genre: Music television
- Presented by: Lionel Long; Johnny O'Keefe
- Country of origin: Australia
- Original language: English

Original release
- Network: Seven Network
- Release: 9 September 1962 – 1965

Sing, Sing, Sing is an Australian music television series that aired from 1962 to 1965 on what would eventually become the Seven Network. Initially hosted by Lionel Long, most of the episodes were hosted by rock-and-roll singer Johnny O'Keefe. The series was produced in Sydney.
