= 2HD =

Radio station in Newcastle, Australia

Coordinates: 32.88786°S 151.723616°E

- Newcastle, New South Wales, Australia; Australia
- Broadcast area: Newcastle RA1
- Frequency: 1143 kHz AM
- Branding: 2HD

Programming
- Language: English
- Format: News talk, classic hits
- Affiliations: Super Radio Network (AM Network)

Ownership
- Owner: Broadcast Operations Group; (2HD Broadcasters Pty Ltd)
- Sister stations: New FM

History
- First air date: 27 January 1925
- Call sign meaning: 2 – New South Wales; Hugh Douglas

Technical information
- Power: 2 kW
- Translators: 97.5 FM Port Stephens & 90.5 FM Lake Macquarie

Links
- Website: www.2hd.com.au

2HD is an Australian radio station in New South Wales. Owned and operated as part of the Super Radio Network of stations, it currently broadcasts a news talk and classic hits format to Newcastle, New South Wales and the Hunter Valley. First broadcast on 27 January 1925, it was established by founder Harry Douglas – from which the station derives its name – and is based in studios in Sandgate alongside sister station New FM.

2HD is Australia's second-oldest existing commercial radio station, first going to air just hours after Sydney's 2UE.

== History ==
=== 1925–1945 ===
2HD began broadcasting on 27 January 1925, a day after 2UE in Sydney began operations. The station's call sign was the initials of the founder, Hugh Alexander McKay Douglas (known as Harry), not "Hunter District" as is commonly believed. Douglas was a man ahead of his time. He had been a keen amateur radio enthusiast for some years prior to 1925, and an alderman on the Newcastle City Council from 1919 to 1922. He was also the first person to own a sulky and car tyre retreading business in Newcastle, as well as having the first petrol station in Newcastle with a bowser.

The radio station was originally situated in the Newcastle suburb of Hamilton, but soon after moved to the corner of Darby and King Streets (Douglas's tyre business address). Douglas sold the station to William Johnston in 1928, who sold the station to the "Airsales Broadcasting Company" in 1930. Airsales owned the company for 10 years, and was responsible for the move to its landmark studio building in Sandgate, which was the home of 2HD for nearly 50 years. Although the building is now very different, the middle section is still the 1931 building.

Under controversial circumstances during World War II, 2HD was closed in 1941, under the National Security Regulations. At the time, the station was owned by the Jehovah's Witnesses and around 25 staff were employed. Stories circulated that the owners were sending covert messages to enemy agents, based on the names and times of the music being played. 2HD remained silent until near the end of the war, when the Australian Labor Party and the Labor Council of New South Wales bought the station, resuming transmissions on 15 January 1945.

One of 2HD's notable personalities in the 1930s was "Uncle" Rex Sinclair, who continued to perform on local radio and stage until shortly before his death in 2001.

=== 1945–1977 ===
The Labor Party and the NSW Labour Council owned 2HD from 1945 until 1999. For the first 29 years of its ownership, the station was under the management of Jim Storey, with his wife Twink acting as program director and on-air personality. Other announcers during this time included Harry Randall, Stuart Dibbley and Tom Delaney.

In the late 1950s and early 1960s, 2HD was one of the founding shareholders of local television station NBN Television.

2HD broadcast in the popular The Good Guys of Life format, also used by other stations, including 2SM Sydney. Presenters during this time included Harry Randall, Tom Delaney, Art Ryan, Haff Enegg, Mal Lamonte, John Hill, Allan McGirvan, Mike Jeffries,Keith Haerris, Graeme Gilbert, Ed Byron, Peter Bradley, Ed Webster,Don Mayo, Rob Maynard and Cliff Musgrave. Towards the end of this period, announcer Geoff Gregory joined the station, but was better known as a program director, and host of the Sunday night program Country Sounds.

After the Good Guys era ended, 2HD transmitted other formats including Easy Alternative and country. In 1977, the original office building on Maitland Road Sandgate was closed. Several years prior to that, the building was gradually being demolished, starting with the destruction of the original transmitter building to make way for a dual carriageway along Maitland Road in 1964. The increased traffic and the location of the road near the old building was taking its toll. A new administration building, nicknamed "the submarine" was built, and Premier Neville Wran opened the building in 1977.

=== 1977–today ===
In the late 1970s and early 1980s, the station was the subject of a takeover bid from NBN, which resulted in a shake-up in ownership at the television station, and the bid was eventually rejected.

For decades after the end of the "Good Guys" era, the station's ratings were in the doldrums, but it accomplished its first number-one ratings success in 1987, after adopting a strong news and talk format. Factors in the success were the recruitment of 2KO's Pat Barton to present the breakfast program, along with Warwick Teece, whose Openline program was a huge success. General Manager David Baldwin was a key part of the station's revival, guiding the team to the top of the ratings. The coverage of the 1989 Newcastle earthquake by the news team, led by Tony Briscoe, won the station a National Radio Award. The 1990s saw 2HD confirm its place as the top-rating station in Newcastle, led by the breakfast team of David Collins and Tanya Wilks, who notched up over eight consecutive years of survey wins, supported by Geoff Jay and Richard King.

The station expanded following the purchase of local FM station New FM in 1995, which resulted in internal remodelling of the building. In 1999, the NSW Labor Party and NSW Labour Council sold the station to Bill Caralis.

In 1997, the station had added the John Laws Morning Show to its line-up, which remained until Laws' departure from 2UE in 2007. He was replaced by Steve Price and, later, Steve Liebmann, until Laws moved to network station 2SM in 2011, and was syndicated to rest of the Super Radio Network.

Until 2006, the station broadcast coverage of Newcastle Knights National Rugby League (NRL) games, then syndicated from the Macquarie Radio Network. However, a dispute between BOG, the Macquarie Radio Network and the NRL saw both the Continuous Call Team and the coverage of Knights games go to rival 102.9 KOFM.

In 2018, A-League, Super Rugby, NRL and AFL returned to 2HD, with various games called live through the network partnership with Crocmedia.

On 14 May 2021, 2HD recorded its lowest ratings result in its history, recording a percentage of 6.6.

== Programming ==
Monday to Friday

- Talk Overnight with Rotational Hosts, Monday (12 am to 5 am)
- Talk Overnight With Gary Stewart, Monday to Friday (12 am to 5 am)
- Breakfast Show with Richard King (5 am to 9 am)
- Chris Smith Morning Show (9 am to 12 pm from 2SM Sydney)
- Brent Bultitude in the Afternoon (12 pm to 3 pm)
- The Hunter Today with Dave Cochrane (3 pm to 5 pm Monday and Tuesday)
- The Hunter Today with Dave Wright (3 pm to 5 pm Wednesday To Friday)
- Talkin' Sport (5 pm to 6 pm from 2SM Sydney)
- Sportsday NSW with Scott Sattler and Mat Rogers (6 pm to 8 pm)
- The Nightline with Cheralyn Darcey (8 pm to 12 am)

Saturday

- Talk Overnight (12 am to 4 am)
- Rotational Hosts (6 am to 12 pm)
- The Driver's Seat (11 pm to 12 pm)
- Saturday talkback (12 pm to 6 pm)
- Saturday talkback (6 pm to 12 am)

Sunday

- Talk Overnight (12am to 4am)
- Reel Adventures (5 am to 6 am)
- Rotational Hosts (6 am to 12 pm)
- Sunday talkback (12 pm to 6 pm)
- Sunday talkback (6 pm to 12 am)

== Key Staff ==
- Guy Ashford – General/Sales Manager
- Luke Hetherington – Promotions & Marketing Director/Operations
- Dave Cochrane – 2HD Content Director
- News Director – Michael Blaxland
- Ross McClymont – Broadcast Engineer/Technology

== See also ==
- List of radio stations in Australia
- Broadcast Operations Group
