= List of radio station callsigns in New South Wales =

The following is a list of Australian radio station callsigns beginning with the number 2, indicating a radio station in the state of New South Wales.

Callsign	Area served	Freq.	Band	On-air ID	Purpose	Site
2AAA	Wagga Wagga	107.1	FM	2AAA	Community	
2AAY	Albury	104.9	FM	Star FM	Commercial	
2ABCFM	New South Wales	various	FM	ABC Classic FM	National	
2ABCRN	New South Wales	various	FM	ABC Radio National	National	
2ABCRR	New South Wales	various	FM	ABC Local Radio	National	
2AD	Armidale	1134	AM	2AD	Commercial	
2AIR	Coffs Harbour	107.9	FM	2AIR	Community	
2APH	Albury	101.7	FM	Vision Australia Radio	Community	
2ARM	Armidale	092.1	FM	FM 92.1	Community	
2AY	Albury	1494	AM	2AY	Commercial	
2BA	Bega	0810	AM	ABC South East NSW	National	
2BAB	Sanctuary Point	092.7	FM	Bay & Basin FM	Community	
2BAC	Bankstown	100.9	FM	2BACR	Community	
2BAR	Bega	093.7	FM	Edge FM	Community	
2BAY	Byron Bay	099.9	FM	Bay FM	Community	
2BBB	Bellingen	107.3	FM	2 Triple B	Community	
2BCB	Bathurst	100.1	FM	Life FM	Community	
2BDR	Albury	105.7	FM	The River	Commercial	
2BH	Broken Hill	0567	AM	2BH	Commercial	
2BJG	Wellington	091.5	FM	Binjang 91.5	Community	
2BL	Sydney	0702	AM	ABC Sydney	National	
2BL/T	Gosford	092.5	FM	ABC Central Coast	National	
2BLU	Katoomba	089.1	FM	Radio Blue Mountains	Community	
2BOB	Taree	104.7	FM	2BOB	Community	
2BRW	Braidwood	088.9	FM	Braidwood Community Radio	Community	
2BS	Bathurst	1503	AM	2BS	Commercial	
2BXS	Bathurst	099.3	FM	B-Rock	Commercial	
2BY	Bourke/Brewarrina	0657	AM	ABC Western Plains	National	
2CBA	Sydney	103.2	FM	Hope 103.2	Community	
2CBD	Deepwater	091.1	FM	2CBD	Community	
2CCB	Orange	103.5	FM	103.5 FM	Community	
2CCC	Gosford	096.3	FM	Coast FM	Community	
2CCM	Gosford	094.1	FM	Today's Country 94one	Community	
2CCR	Parramatta	090.5	FM	Alive 90.5	Community	
2CFM	Gosford	101.3	FM	Sea FM	Commercial	
2CFS	Coffs Harbour	106.4	FM	2CS	Commercial	
2CH	Sydney	1170	AM	2CH	Commercial	
2CHR	Cessnock/Maitland	096.5	FM	2CHR	Community	
2CHY	Coffs Harbour	104.1	FM	CHY FM	Community	
2CLR	Grafton	104.7	FM	FM 104.7	Commercial	
2CO	Southern New South Wales	0675	AM	ABC Riverina	National	
2COW	Casino	107.9	FM	COW FM	Community	
2CP	Cooma	1602	AM	ABC South East NSW	National	
2CR	Central Tablelands	0549	AM	ABC Central West NSW	National	
2CSF	Coffs Harbour	105.5	FM	Star FM	Commercial	
2CUZ	Bourke	106.5	FM	2CUZ	Community	
2CVC	Grafton	103.1	FM	Life FM	Community	
2DAY	Sydney	104.1	FM	2Day	Commercial	
2DBO	Dubbo	093.5	FM	Star FM	Commercial	
2DCB	Dubbo	094.3	FM	Dubbo's 94.3	Community	
2DRY	Broken Hill	107.7	FM	2DRY	Community	
2DU	Dubbo	1251	AM	2DU	Commercial	
2EA	New South Wales	various	AM	SBS Radio	National	
2EAR	Moruya	107.5	FM	2EARfm	Community	
2EC	Bega	0765	AM	2EC	Commercial	
2EEE	Bega	102.5	FM	Power FM	Commercial	
2EL	Orange	1089	AM	2EL	Commercial	
2EZY	Lithgow	090.5	FM	EZY FM	Community	
2FBI	Sydney	094.5	FM	FBi	Community	
2GB	Sydney	0873	AM	2GB	Commercial	
2GBN	Goulburn	107.7	FM	GNFM	Commercial	
2GCB	Gosford	094.9	FM	Rhema FM	Community	
2GCR	Goulburn	103.3	FM	FM 103.3	Community	
2GEE	Mudgee	093.1	FM	Real FM	Commercial	
2GEM	Inverell	095.1	FM	Gem FM	Commercial	
2GF	Grafton	1206	AM	2GF	Commercial	
2GGG	Gunnedah	097.5	FM	Triple G	Commercial	
2GGO	Gosford	107.7	FM	2GO	Commercial	
2GL	Glen Innes	0819	AM	ABC New England North West	National	
2GLA	Forster	101.5	FM	Great Lakes FM	Community	
2GLF	Liverpool	089.3	FM	89.3 FM	Community	
2GOS	Gosford	104.5	FM	Star 104.5	Commercial	
2GZF	Orange	105.9	FM	2GZ	Commercial	
2HAY	Hay	092.1	FM	2Hay FM	Community	
2HC	Coffs Harbour	0639	AM	Radio 639	Commercial	
2HD	Newcastle	1143	AM	2HD	Commercial	
2HHH	Hornsby	100.1	FM	Triple H	Community	
2HIL	Broken Hill	106.9	FM	Hill FM	Commercial	
2HIM	Tamworth	089.7	FM	Rhema FM	Community	
2HVR	Upper Hunter	105.7	FM	ABC Upper Hunter	National	
2ICE	Lithgow	107.9	FM	Move FM	Commercial	
2ILA	Illawarra	097.3	FM	ABC Illawarra	National	
2JJJ	New South Wales	various	FM	Triple J	National	
2KKO	Newcastle	102.9	FM	KOFM	Commercial	
2KP	Kempsey	0684	AM	ABC Mid North Coast NSW	National	
2KRR	Kandos	098.7	FM	KRR	Community	
2KY	Sydney	1017	AM	Sky Sports Radio	Commercial	
2LF	Young	1350	AM	2LF	Commercial	
2LFF	Young	093.9	FM	ROCCY FM	Commercial	
2LG	Lithgow	1395	AM	ABC Central West NSW	National	
2LIV	Wollongong	094.1	FM	Pulse 94.1	Community	
2LM	Lismore	0900	AM	2LM	Commercial	
2LND	Sydney	093.7	FM	Koori Radio	Community	
2LRR	Lightning Ridge	089.7	FM	Opal FM	Community	
2LT	Lithgow	0900	AM	2LT	Commercial	
2LVR	Parkes	097.9	FM	Valley FM	Community	
2MAC	Campbelltown	091.3	FM	C91.3	Commercial	
2MAX	Narrabri	091.3	FM	2Max FM	Community	
2MBS	Sydney	102.5	FM	Fine Music 102.5	Community	
2MCE	Bathurst	092.3	FM	2MCE	Community	
2MCR	Campbelltown	100.3	FM	2MCR	Community	
2MFM	Sydney	092.1	FM	Muslim Community Radio	Community	
2MG	Mudgee	1449	AM	2MG	Commercial	
2MIA	Griffith	095.1	FM	2MIA	Community	
2ML	Murwillumbah	0720	AM	ABC North Coast NSW	National	
2MMM	Sydney	104.9	FM	Triple M	Commercial	
2MNO	Monaro	093.3	FM	2MNO	Community	
2MO	Gunnedah	1080	AM	2MO	Commercial	
2MOR	Deniliquin	102.5	FM	Classic Rock	Commercial	
2MRR	Mid North Coast	092.3 & 95.5	FM	ABC Mid North Coast NSW	National	
2MTM	Coonamble	091.9	FM	MTM	Community	
2MVB	Taree	107.3	FM	Max FM	Commercial	
2MW	Murwillumbah	0972	AM	Radio 97	Commercial	
2MWM	Manly	088.7	FM	Radio Northern Beaches	Community	
2NAR	Narrandera	091.1	FM	Spirit FM	Community	
2NB	Broken Hill	0999	AM	ABC Broken Hill	National	
2NBC	Narwee	090.1	FM	2NBC	Community	
2NC	Newcastle	1233	AM	ABC Newcastle	National	
2NCR	Lismore	092.9	FM	River FM	Community	
2NEB	Armidale	100.3	FM	FM 100.3	Commercial	
2NEW	Newcastle	105.3	FM	New FM	Commercial	
2NI	Norfolk Island	089.9	FM	Radio Norfolk	Community	
2NIM	Nimbin	102.3	FM	NIM FM	Community	
2NM	Muswellbrook	0981	AM	2NM	Commercial	
2NNR	Richmond and Tweed	094.5	FM	ABC North Coast NSW	National	
2NOW	Moree	098.3	FM	Now FM	Commercial	
2NR	Grafton	0738	AM	ABC North Coast NSW	National	
2NSB	Chatswood	099.3	FM	FM 99.3	Community	
2NU	Tamworth	0648	AM	ABC New England North West	National	
2NUR	Newcastle	103.7	FM	2NUR	Community	
2NVR	Nambucca Heads	105.9	FM	2NVR	Community	
2NWR	Upper Namoi	099.1	FM	ABC New England North West	National	
2NZ	Inverell	1188	AM	2NZ	Commercial	
2OAG	Orange	105.1	FM	Star FM	Commercial	
2OCB	Orange	107.5	FM	FM 107.5	Community	
2OLD	Lake Macquarie	097.3	FM	Radio Yesteryear	Community	
2ONE	Katoomba	096.1	FM	CADA	Commercial	
2OOO	Sydney	098.5	FM	2000 FM	Community	
2PAR	Ballina	101.9	FM	Paradise FM	Community	
2PB	New South Wales	various	AM	ABC NewsRadio	National	
2PK	Parkes	1404	AM	2PK	Commercial	
2PM	Kempsey	0531	AM	Radio 531	Commercial	
2PMQ	Port Macquarie	099.9	FM	Rhema FM	Community	
2PNN	New South Wales	various	FM	ABC NewsRadio	National	
2PQQ	Kempsey	106.7	FM	2MC	Commercial	
2PSR	Port Stephens	100.9	FM	Port Stephens FM	Community	
2PTV	Sydney	095.3	FM	Smooth 95.3	Commercial	
2QBN	Queanbeyan	096.7	FM	QBN-FM	Community	
2QN	Deniliquin	1521	AM	2QN	Commercial	
2RBR	Coraki	088.9	FM	88.9 FM	Community	
2RDJ	Burwood	088.1	FM	2RDJ	Community	
2RE	Taree	1557	AM	2RE	Commercial	
2REM	Albury	107.3	FM	2REM 107.3 FM	Community	
2RES	Waverley	089.7	FM	Eastside FM	Community	
2RFM	Newcastle	099.7	FM	Rhema FM	Community	
2RG	Griffith	0963	AM	2RG	Commercial	
2RGF	Griffith	099.7	FM	Star FM	Commercial	
2RN	New South Wales	various	AM	ABC Radio National	National	
2ROK	Parkes	095.5	FM	ROK FM	Commercial	
2ROX	Kempsey	105.1	FM	Star FM	Commercial	
2RPH	Sydney	1224	AM	2RPH	Community	
2RRR	Ryde	088.5	FM	2RRR	Community	
2RSR	Sydney City	088.9	FM	Radio Skid Row	Community	
2RVR	Riverina	089.9 & 100.5	FM	ABC Riverina	National	
2SBSFM	Sydney	097.7	FM	SBS Radio	National	
2SEA	Eden	104.7	FM	2SEA	Community	
2SER	Sydney	107.3	FM	2SER	Community	
2SKI	Cooma	097.7	FM	Snow FM	Commercial	
2SM	Sydney	1269	AM	2SM	Commercial	
2SNO	Goulburn	093.5	FM	Eagle FM	Commercial	
2SNR	Gosford	093.3	FM	Radio Five-O-Plus	Community	
2SSR	Sutherland	099.7	FM	2SSR	Community	
2ST	Nowra	0999	AM	2ST	Commercial	
2STA	Inverell	091.9	FM	STA FM	Community	
2SWR	Blacktown	099.9	FM	SWR FM	Community	
2SYD	Sydney	096.9	FM	Nova	Commercial	
2TEM	Temora	102.5	FM	TEM-FM	Community	
2TEN	Tenterfield	089.7	FM	Ten FM	Community	
2TLP	Taree	103.3	FM	Ngarralinyi	Community	
2TM	Tamworth	1287	AM	2TM	Commercial	
2TR	Taree	0756	AM	ABC Mid North Coast NSW	National	
2TRR	Dunedoo	096.1	FM	3 Rivers Radio	Community	
2TTT	Tamworth	092.9	FM	92.9	Commercial	
2TVR	Tumut	096.3	FM	Sounds of the Mountains	Community	
2UE	Sydney	0954	AM	2UE	Commercial	
2UH	Muswellbrook	1044	AM	ABC Upper Hunter	National	
2UUL	Wollongong	096.5	FM	Wave FM	Commercial	
2UUS	Sydney	101.7	FM	WSFM	Commercial	
2UUU	Nowra	104.5	FM	Triple U	Community	
2VLY	Muswellbrook	098.1	FM	Power FM	Commercial	
2VM	Moree	1530	AM	2VM	Commercial	
2VOX	Wollongong	106.9	FM	Vox FM	Community	
2VTR	Windsor	089.9	FM	Hawkesbury Radio	Community	
2WA	Wilcannia	1584	AM	ABC Western Plains	National	
2WAR	Gilgandra	098.9	FM	2WAR	Community	
2WAY	Port Macquarie	103.9	FM	2WAY	Community	
2WCR	Coonabarabran	099.5	FM	2WCR	Community	
2WEB	Bourke	0585	AM	2WEB	Community	
2WET	Kempsey	103.1	FM	Tank FM	Community	
2WFM	Sydney	106.5	FM	KIIS 106.5	Commercial	
2WG	Wagga Wagga	1152	AM	2WG	Commercial	
2WIN	Wollongong	098.1	FM	i98FM	Commercial	
2WKT	Bowral	107.1	FM	Highland FM	Community	
2WLF	Wagga Wagga	101.9	FM	Life FM	Community	
2WOW	Penrith	100.7	FM	WOW FM	Community	
2WPR	Central Western Slopes	107.1	FM	ABC Western Plains	National	
2WSK	Nowra	094.9	FM	Power FM	Commercial	
2WYR	Moss Vale	092.5	FM	92.5 FM	Community	
2WZD	Wagga Wagga	093.1	FM	Star FM	Commercial	
2XXL	Cooma	096.1	FM	XLFM	Commercial	
2XXX	Newcastle	106.9	FM	NXFM	Commercial	
2YAS	Yass	100.3	FM	Yass FM	Community	
2YOU	Tamworth	088.9	FM	88.9 FM	Community	
2YYY	Young	092.3	FM	2YYY	Community	
2ZOO	Dubbo	092.7	FM	Zoo FM	Commercial	
2ZZZ	Lismore	100.9	FM	ZZZ FM	Commercial	
WTF	Norfolk Island	87.6	FM	Watawieh FM	Narrowcast	

== Defunct Callsigns ==
Callsign	Area served	Freq.	Band	Fate	Freq currently	Purpose
2AN	Armidale	0720	AM	Moved to FM 101.9 in 1990s as 2NWR	2RN	National
2BCR	Bankstown	100.9	FM	Shut down in 2007	2BAC	Community
2BE	Sydney		AM	Shut down in 1929		Commercial
2BE	Bega	0765	AM	Changed call to 2EC in 1987	2EC	Commercial
2CCH	Gosford	094.1	FM	Shut down in 2007	2CCM	Community
2CK	Cessnock	1460	AM	Moved to Muswellbrook and changed call to 2NM in 1954	2NM	Commercial
2CS	Coffs Harbour	0639	AM	Moved to FM in 2000 as 2CFS	2HC	Commercial
2CT	Campbelltown	1602	AM	Shut down in 1981	silent	Community
2EU (Electrical Utilities)	Sydney	1025	AM	Changed call to 2UE in 1924, after a few months on air	silent	Commercial
2FC	Sydney	0576	AM	Changed call to 2RN in 1991	2RN	National
2GGZ	Muswellbrook/Murrurundi	101.7	FM	Shut down in 2006	silent	Community
2GN	Goulburn	1368	AM	Moved to FM in 2022 as 2GBN	silent	Commercial
2GO	Gosford	0801	AM	Moved to FM in 1992 as 2GGO	Rete Italia (HPON)	Commercial
2GU	Goulburn	1098	AM	Changed call to 2RN in 1991	2RN	National
2GZ	Orange	1089	AM	Moved to FM in 1999 as 2OAG	2EL	Commercial
2HOT	Cobar	102.9	FM	Shut down in 2008	silent	Community
2HR	Maitland	1340	AM	Moved to Newcastle and changed call to 2NX in 1954	see 2NX	Commercial
2JJ	Sydney	1539	AM	Moved to FM in 1980 as 2JJJ	Rete Italia (HPON)	National
2KA	Katoomba	0783	AM	Moved to FM in 1992 as 2ONE	silent	Commercial
2KM	Kempsey	0531	AM	Changed call to 2MC in 1982	see 2MC	Commercial
2KO	Newcastle	1413	AM	Moved to FM in 1992 as 2KKO	2EA	Commercial
2LV	Inverell		AM	Shut down when 2NZ started broadcasting in 1937	2NZ	Commercial
2MAQ	Lake Macquarie	097.3	FM	Shut down in 2005	2OLD	Community
2MC	Kempsey	0531	AM	Moved to FM in 2000 as 2PQQ	2PM	Commercial
		AM	Shut down in 1930		Commercial	
2MV	Moss Vale		AM	Shut down in 1931	silent	Commercial
2MVH	Moss Vale	092.5	FM	Changed call to 2WYR in 2007	2WYR	Community
2NA	Newcastle	1512	AM	Changed call to 2RN in 1991	2RN	National
2NT	Nowra	0603	AM	Changed call to 2RN in 1991	2RN	National
2NX	Newcastle	1341	AM	Moved to FM in 1992 as 2XXX	2KY (HPON)	Commercial
2OO	Wollongong	1575	AM	Moved to FM in 1992 as 2WIN	Rete Italia (HPON)	Commercial
2SB	Sydney	Sealed Set system	AM	Changed call to 2BL in 1924	2BL	limited commercial
2SCR	Barham	089.1	FM	Shut down in 2006	silent	Community
2TCC	Murwillumbah	101.3	FM	Shut down in 2007	TCBL	Community
2TLC	Maclean	100.3	FM	Shut down in 2011	TCBL	Community
2UW	Sydney	1107	AM	Moved to FM in 1994 as 2WFM	2EA	Commercial
2WL	Wollongong	1314	AM	Moved to FM in 1992 as 2UUL	2KY (HPON)	Commercial
2WN	Wollongong	1431	AM	Moved to FM in 1991 as 2ILA	2RN	National
2WS	Sydney Western Suburbs	1224	AM	Moved to FM in 1993 now Gold 101.7	2RPH (Sydney)	Commercial
2XL	Broken Hill		AM	Shut down in 1932		Commercial
2XL	Cooma		AM	Changed to 2XXL, then to FM		Commercial
2XN	Lismore		AM	Shut down when 2LM started broadcasting in 1936	2LM	Commercial
