= 2015 New South Wales Cup =

- League: NSW Rugby League
- Duration: March 7 to September 27
- Teams: 12
- Premiers: Newcastle Knights
- Minor Premiers: Mount Pritchard Mounties
- Runners-up: Wyong Roos
- Wooden spoon: Wentworthville Magpies
- Man of Steel: Mitchell Barnett (NSW Cup Player of the Year)
- Top point-scorer(s): Mitch Cornish 162 (10 tries, 61 goals)
- Top try-scorer: Tyrone Phillips 23

Ron Massey Cup
- Number of teams: 11
- Premiers: Mount Pritchard Mounties
- Minor Premiers: Mount Pritchard Mounties
- Runners-up: Asquith Magpies
- Player of the year: Alofi Mataele (Concord Burwood)
- Top point-scorer(s): Sam Aiga (Mounties) 212 (15 tries, 76 goals)
- Top try-scorer: Mick Pearsall (Asquith) 30

Sydney Shield
- Number of teams: 13
- Premiers: Wentworthville Magpies
- Minor Premiers: Wentworthville Magpies
- Runners-up: Hills District Bulls
- Player of the year: Ben Baker (East Campbelltown)
- Top point-scorer(s): Ben Baker (East Campbelltown) 254 (26 tries, 75 goals)
- Top try-scorer: Ben Baker (East Campbelltown) 26

The 2015 New South Wales Cup season, was the second tier rugby league competition held in New South Wales, after the National Rugby League. The 2015 season kicked off on 7 March 2015 and was won by the Newcastle Knights.

== Clubs ==
In 2015, 12 clubs were fielding teams in the New South Wales Cup.

It was announced in 2014 that the longstanding relationship between the Sydney Roosters and the Newtown Jets had come to an end, with the NRL Club deciding to link with the Wyong Roos in the NSW Cup as their feeder club. The Cronulla Sharks decided to pull their own team from the competition opting into taking the Newtown Jets on as their feeder club, forming a new relationship with a 3-year agreement between the clubs.

Colors	Club	Location	Stadium	Founded	Joined*	A-Grade Team
	Canterbury-Bankstown Bulldogs	Belmore, NSW, Australia	Belmore Sports Ground	1934	2008	Canterbury-Bankstown Bulldogs
	Illawarra Cutters	Wollongong, NSW, Australia	WIN Stadium	2012	2012	St. George-Illawarra Dragons
	Manly-Warringah Sea Eagles	Manly, NSW, Australia	Brookvale Oval	1946	2008	Manly-Warringah Sea Eagles
	Mount Pritchard Mounties	Mount Pritchard, NSW, Australia	Mount Pritchard Oval	1927	2012	Canberra Raiders
	Newcastle Knights	Newcastle, NSW, Australia	Hunter Stadium	1988	2012	Newcastle Knights
	Newtown Jets	Newtown, NSW, Australia	Henson Park	1908	2008	Cronulla-Sutherland Sharks
	New Zealand Warriors	Penrose, Auckland	Mount Smart Stadium	1995	2014	New Zealand Warriors
	North Sydney Bears	Sydney, NSW, Australia	North Sydney Oval	1908	2008	South Sydney Rabbitohs
	Penrith Panthers	Penrith, NSW, Australia	Sportingbet Stadium	1966	2014	Penrith Panthers
	Wentworthville Magpies	Wentworthville, NSW, Australia	Ringrose Park	1963	2008	Parramatta Eels
	Wests Tigers	Campbelltown, NSW, Australia	Campbelltown Stadium; Leichhardt Oval	1999	2013	Wests Tigers
	Wyong Roos	Kanwal, NSW, Australia	Morrie Breen Oval	1910	2013	Sydney Roosters

*: The season the team joined is in the NSW Cup, not any other competition before this.

== Ladder ==
2015 New South Wales Cup season - Final Table
	Team	Pld	W	D	L	B	PF	PA	PD	Pts
1	Mount Pritchard Mounties	22	14	2	6	3	653	493	+160	36
2	Wyong Roos	22	15	0	7	3	581	422	+159	36
3	Penrith Panthers	22	15	0	7	3	489	387	+102	36
4	New Zealand Warriors	22	13	0	9	3	516	556	-40	32
5	Canterbury-Bankstown Bulldogs	22	12	0	10	3	578	524	+54	30
6	Manly-Warringah Sea Eagles	22	11	0	11	3	584	571	+13	28
7	Newcastle Knights	22	11	0	11	3	552	542	+10	28
8	North Sydney Bears	22	9	2	11	3	550	563	-13	26
9	Newtown Jets	22	8	1	13	3	492	560	-68	23
10	Illawarra Cutters	22	8	0	14	3	526	552	-26	22
11	Wests Tigers	22	7	1	14	3	460	586	-126	21
12	Wentworthville Magpies	22	6	0	16	3	402	627	-225	18

== Finals series ==
For the fourth year in a row, the NSWRL used the finals system previously implemented by the ARL competition from the 1990s and the NRL from 2012 to decide the grand finalists from the top eight finishing teams.

Home	Score	Away	Match information
Home	Score	Away	Date and time (local)	Venue	Referees	Crowd
QUALIFYING & ELIMINATION FINALS
Wyong Roos	28 10	Penrith Panthers	5 September	Penrith Stadium
Mount Pritchard Mounties	43 – 10	New Zealand Warriors	5 September	Belmore Sports Ground
Canterbury-Bankstown Bulldogs	22 – 4	North Sydney Bears	5 September	Belmore Sports Ground
Manly-Warringah Sea Eagles	6 – 45	Newcastle Knights	5 September	Belmore Sports Ground
SEMI FINALS
Newcastle Knights	44 12	Manly-Warringah Sea Eagles	12 September	Jubilee Oval, Kogarah
Canterbury-Bankstown Bulldogs	33 – 20	New Zealand Warriors	12 September	Jubilee Oval, Kogarah
PRELIMINARY FINALS
Mount Pritchard Mounties	26 – 30	Newcastle Knights	19 September	Leichhardt Oval
Wyong Roos	44 – 20	Canterbury-Bankstown Bulldogs	19 September	Leichhardt Oval
GRAND FINAL
Newcastle Knights	20 – 10	Wyong Roos	27 September	Pirtek Stadium

=== Chart ===
Qualifying and elimination finals
Belmore Sports Ground
1	Mount Pritchard Mounties	43
4	New Zealand	10
Belmore Sports Ground
5	Canterbury-Bankstown	22
8	North Sydney	4
Belmore Sports Ground
6	Manly-Warringah	6
7	Newcastle	45
Penrith Stadium
2	Wyong	28
3	Penrith	10

Semi-finals
Kogarah Jubilee Oval
New Zealand	20
Canterbury-Bankstown	33
Kogarah Jubilee Oval
Newcastle	44
Penrith	12

Preliminary finals
Leichhardt Oval
Mount Pritchard Mounties	26
Newcastle	30
Leichhardt Oval
Wyong	44
Canterbury-Bankstown	20

Grand final
27 Sept, Pirtek Stadium
Newcastle	20
Wyong	10

== 2015 NRL State Championship match ==
From 2014 onwards, New South Wales Cup Premiers play against the Queensland Cup Premiers with the winner to be crowned the NRL State Champions.

Sunday, 4 October
3:40pm (AEDT)

Newcastle Knights

2015 NSW Cup Premiers

Tries:
G Ndaira (28')
J Feeney(42')
Goals:
G Ndaira 2/2
12–26
Report

Ipswich Jets

2015 QLD Cup Premiers

Tries:
M Parcell (1')
B McConnachie (10')
M Barba (37')
R Griffin(63')
Goals:
C Anderson 5/5

ANZ Stadium, Sydney
Referee: Matt Noyen

== Broadcast Information ==
=== Television ===
==== Fox Sports (Australia) ====
Fox Sports 1 provide live coverage of at least one match each week throughout the regular season along with selected finals.

==== Sky Sport (New Zealand) ====
Sky Sports NZ cover a number of New Zealand Warriors home matches. Some of these matches will be simulcast in Australia on Fox Sports 1 at their discretion.

=== Radio ===
==== Hawkesbury Radio ====
Hawkesbury Radio call a number of Panthers VB NSW Cup games and some of Windsor Wolves games in the Ron Massey Cup where possible.

==== SteeleSports.com.au ====
Covering predominantly Newtown Jets home fixtures.

==== 2GLF ====
2GLF provide coverage of a host of VB NSW Cup games with a specific charter of servicing teams such as the Tigers, Mounties, Bulldogs and Magpies.

==== Alive 90.5 ====
ALIVE fm call selected Wentworthville Magpies home fixtures from Ringrose Park.

==== Triple H 100.1FM ====
Triple H call a few VB NSW Cup games from time to time where possible.

==== 2GB ====
Provide score updates where possible during the regular season.

==== ABC Radio Grandstand ====
Provide Full Time scores to their listeners as they become available throughout the weekend.

== Ron Massey Cup ==
=== Ladder ===
2015 Ron Massey Cup season - Final Table
	Team	Pld	W	D	L	B	PF	PA	PD	Pts
1	Mount Pritchard Mounties	20	18	0	2	2	722	322	+400	40
2	Wentworthville Magpies	20	14	0	6	2	602	343	+259	32
3	Asquith Magpies	20	12	0	8	2	607	460	+147	28
4	Windsor Wolves	20	12	0	8	2	486	510	-24	28
5	Guildford Owls	20	9	1	10	2	529	543	-14	23
6	Concord Burwood Wolves	20	9	1	10	2	540	572	-32	23
7	Blacktown Workers	20	9	0	11	2	558	455	+103	22
8	Auburn Warriors	20	9	0	11	2	619	558	+61	22
9	Western Suburbs Magpies	20	9	0	11	2	477	518	-41	22
10	Cabramatta Two Blues	20	8	0	12	2	586	563	+23	20
11	Kingsgrove Colts	20	0	0	20	2	232	1114	-882	4

=== Finals ===
Qualifying and elimination finals
1	Mounties	24
4	Windsor	34
5	Guildford	22
8	Auburn	24
6	Concord Burwood	6
7	Blacktown	50
2	Wentworthville	34
3	Asquith	6

Semi-finals
Mounties	36
Auburn	4
Asquith	38
Blacktown	14

Preliminary finals
New Era Stadium, Cabramatta
Windsor	30
Asquith	32
Leichhardt Oval
Wentworthville	2
Mounties	12

Grand final
27 Sept, Pirtek Stadium
Asquith	14
Mounties	30

== Sydney Shield ==
=== Ladder ===
2015 Sydney Shield season - Final Table
	Team	Pld	W	D	L	B	PF	PA	PD	Pts
1	Wentworthville Magpies	20	17	0	3	2	670	412	+258	38
2	Windsor Wolves	20	13	2	5	2	652	474	+178	30
3	Peninsula Seagulls	20	13	0	7	2	602	474	+128	30
4	Mounties	20	13	0	7	2	608	503	+105	30
5	Hills District Bulls	20	12	1	7	2	602	424	+178	29
6	East Campbelltown Eagles	20	11	1	8	2	592	450	+142	27
7	Belrose Eagles	20	9	0	11	2	504	466	+38	22
8	Guildford Owls	20	8	2	10	2	479	514	-35	22
9	Blacktown Workers	20	7	1	12	2	554	573	-19	19
10	Auburn Warriors	20	7	1	12	2	532	684	-152	19
11	Cabramatta Two Blues	20	5	2	13	2	524	818	-294	16
12	Asquith Magpies	20	5	1	14	2	421	616	-195	15
13	Western Suburbs Magpies	20	4	1	15	2	431	763	-332	13

Two points deducted from Windsor for playing an unregistered player.

=== Finals ===
Qualifying and elimination finals
1	Wentworthville	34
4	Mounties	30
5	Hills District	38
8	Guildford	8
6	East Campbelltown	14
7	Belrose	26
2	Windsor	24
3	Peninsula	30

Semi-finals
Mounties	24
Hills District	30
Windsor	34
Belrose	16

Preliminary finals
New Era Stadium, Cabramatta
Wentworthville	68
Windsor	6
Leichhardt Oval
Peninsula	18
Hills District	26

Grand final
27 Sept, Pirtek Stadium
Wentworthville	26
Hills District	22
