= The Scone Advocate =

- Front page of The Scone Advocate on 22 December 2005
- Type: Weekly newspaper
- Format: Tabloid
- Owner(s): Australian Community Media
- Editor: N/A
- Founded: 7 October 1887
- Headquarters: 206 Kelly Street, Scone, NSW, Australia
- Website: www.scone.yourguide.com.au

The Scone Advocate is an Australian local newspaper, serving the communities of Scone, Aberdeen and Murrurundi in the Upper Hunter Valley. It is owned by Australian Community Media, and goes on sale each Thursday for $1.40. The newspaper was founded in 1887, the same year Scone was declared a municipality.

== History ==
The Advocate began publication on 7 October 1887 as a weekly broadsheet newspaper, under the ownership of founder Arthur "Advocate" Smith. Five years later, it became a twice-weekly publication, and in 1898, the paper purchased their first typewriter. In 1933, Smith died, and was replaced by his son Arthur Fleming "Tod" Smith. The paper commenced construction of a new building in 1935, and later soon moved to a new location in Kelly Street, replacing the original offices at the corner of Liverpool and Guernsey Streets, which were destroyed by fire in 1942.

A year later, John Arthur "Jack" Smith replaced his father as editor of the Advocate. In 1954, publication days were changed to Tuesdays and Fridays. Also in 1954, the paper is sold to a locally owned company, Scone Advocate Limited, with local businessman J.M. "Mick" Flint as managing director. Later that year, then-editor Vern Hennessy left the paper, and the paper switched to a tabloid format.

Between 1957 and 1975, the Advocate had three editors: Joseph Charles "Joe" Court, William E.M "Mac" Abbott, and James "Jim" Brundson. In 1974, the newspaper was purchased by Western Newspapers Ltd., a subsidiary of Consolidated Press Group, controlled by the Packer family. The next year, Mike Pritchard was appointed as editor, and continued in that role until 1990. In 1976, the newspaper changed to a weekly publication, released Wednesdays.

In 1982, a move to develop the paper into a regional newspaper called The Valley Advocate with a wider-circulation proved unsuccessful. The paper was given away free outside of Scone, but local residents were still required to pay twenty five cents to buy a copy. In 1984, the Scone Advocate banner was restored, with a new publication date of Thursday (which is still the case today. Also in that year, the Packer-controlled Regional Publishers Pty. Ltd. was merged with Upper Hunter Newspapers, owned by the McClintock family of Muswellbrook, to form Upper Hunter Publishers Pty. Ltd. This led to the paper being published off-site in Muswellbrook, with its commercial printing division sold to a private company in 1986.

In 1987, Rural Press Limited purchased Regional Newspapers' group of publications, including the Advocate, and printing moved again, this time to the Maitland Mercury site. In 1990, Anthony "Tony" Newman takes over from Pritchard as editor for the next two and a half years. In 1991, the newspaper launched its first complimentary magazine for that year's Scone Horse Week. A succession of female editors soon followed, with Annella "Nella" Powell taking control in 1993, and Rhonda Turner in 1994.

In 1996, the Advocate was compiled on site for the first time using the Quark Xpress system, replacing the Atex system that had to be accessed in Muswellbrook. In 1997, the publication began to use colour on a regular basis for the first time starting on 4 December. The Advocate acquired a digital camera in 2000, and also launched their website that year. Also in 2000, Rural Press sold off the Advocate's long-time headquarters to local businessmen, and moved into rented premises in 2001. Turner resigned as editor in 2002, and since then a number of journalists have worked at the Advocate.

In 2005, the printing facilities were moved, this time to Tamworth at the Northern Daily Leader site. In 2007, Fairfax Media acquired Rural Press in an agreed merger, while locally, the paper's Macintosh computers were replaced with PCs. The paper celebrated its 120th anniversary in October with the discovery of old film footage from the first few months of transmission of NBN Television, which looked at the operations of a local newspaper.

== National attention ==
The newspaper drew national media attention for its coverage of a gruesome murder in Aberdeen in the late 1990s, particularly from the ABC program Media Watch in 2000. The newspaper was criticised by the program, local readers and the victim's family for its graphic coverage. The editor at the time, Rhonda Turner, defended the newspaper and its reporting of the incident.

Prior to this, the newspaper's articles had appeared as part of the game show Don't Forget Your Toothbrush.

== Alumni ==
- Mike Pritchard (editor, 1975–1990, now breakfast presenter at ABC Upper Hunter)
- David Bauche (journalist, 2007, now at 2NM/Power FM Muswellbrook)

== Digitisation ==
The paper has been digitised as part of the Australian Newspapers Digitisation Program project of the National Library of Australia.

== See also ==
- List of newspapers in Australia
- List of newspapers in New South Wales
