= Planet Country with Big Stu & MJ =

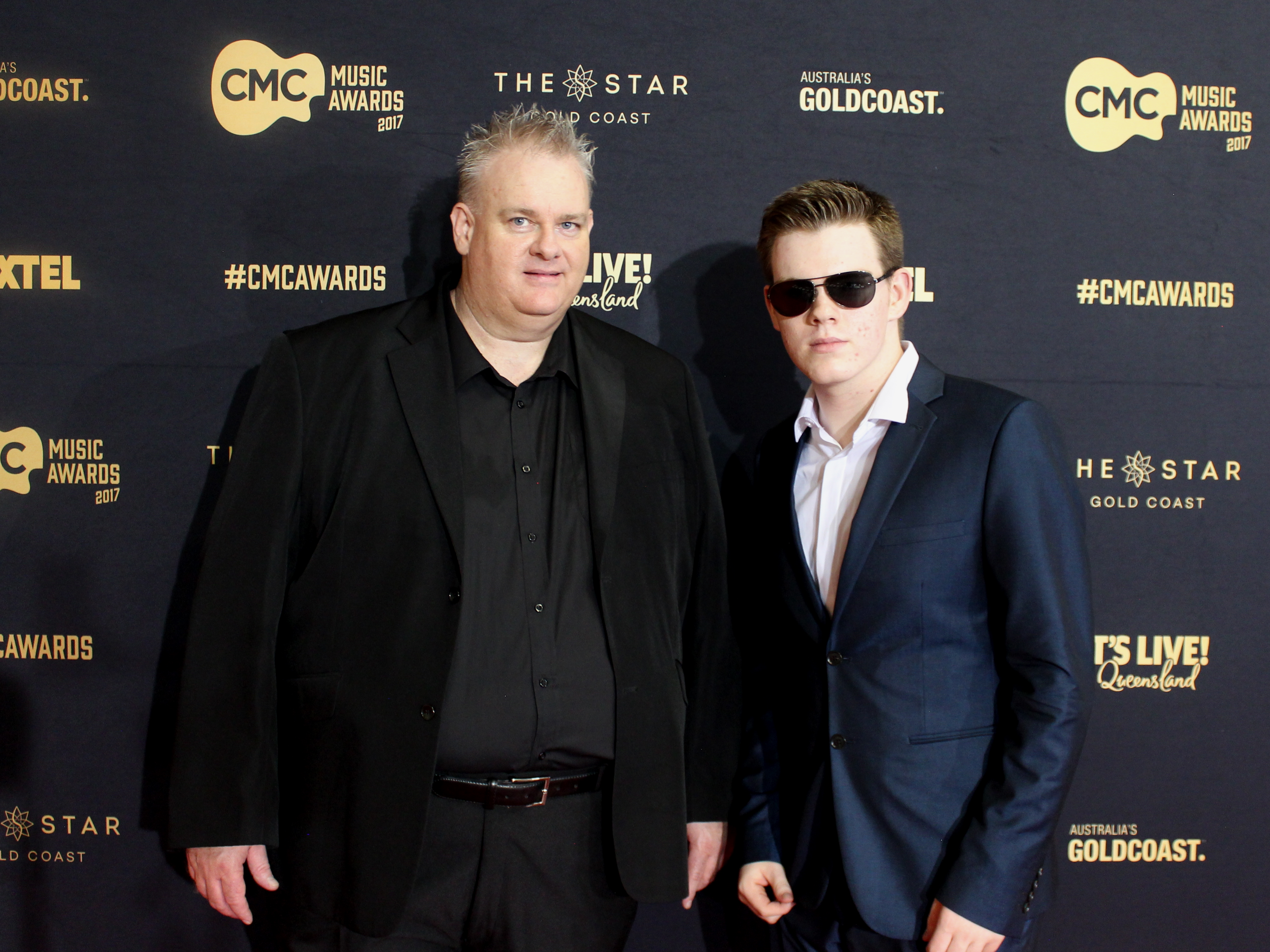
- Big Stu and MJ on the red carpet at the CMC Awards 2017
- Genre: Country music
- Running time: 115 minutes approx.
- Country of origin: Australia
- Language(s): English
- Home station: SWR Triple 9
- Syndicates: The Wolf Australia, Hawkesbury Gold 89.9 FM
- Hosted by: Stuart 'Big Stu' Brokenbrough, Matthew 'MJ' Brokenbrough
- Recording studio: Blacktown, Sydney
- Original release: 5 June 2014
- Website: Official Website
- Podcast: Spotify, Spreaker, iTunes, iHeartRadio

Planet Country is a country music radio and video program based in Sydney, Australia and presented by Big Stu and MJ. The program airs a country music format focusing on modern, crossover country. The radio show aired live on SWR Triple 9, broadcasting on 99.9 FM to the Sydney metropolitan every Monday night from 6 pm to 8 pm local time.

== About ==
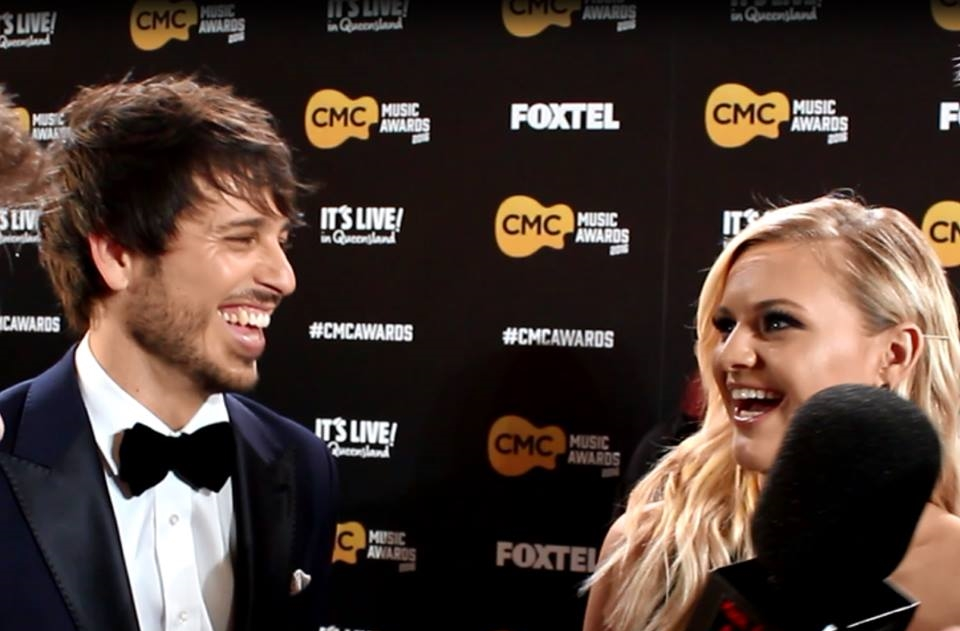
Planet Country interviewing Kelsea Ballerini and Morgan Evans when they first begun dating, at the CMC Music Awards 2016.

Planet Country is a dual music radio and video talk show hosted by Big Stu and MJ. The radio show made its debuted on 5 June 2014. Originally airing on community radio station Alive 90.5 FM from 6 pm to 7 pm, the show moved to neighbouring station SWR Triple 9 FM in April 2018.

The move to SWR Triple 9 also saw the radio show move into live video broadcasting through Facebook. The radio show was airing simultaneously on radio and Facebook live. Music continued to air on radio while Facebook received 'off air' behind the scenes talk with studio guests.

During its original run on radio, the program saw syndication on The Wolf Australia and Hawkesbury Gold 89.9 FM.

On 15 April 2019, Planet Country went to air for its 250th episode of the show. The following month however saw the radio show be placed on hiatus for personal reasons (see below).

=== Alive 90.5 (2014–2018) ===
The show made its debut on 5 June 2014 at community radio station Alive 90.5 FM, airing on Thursdays from 6 pm to 7 pm.

While at Alive 90.5, the program begun live syndication and airing replays on internet radio station, The Wolf Australia.

The show departed Alive 90.5 in April 2018 to join neighbouring community station SWR Triple 9 FM. Following the move, Big Stu begun presenting a spin-off program on Alive 90.5 in the original time slot called 'Big Stu's Country Universe'. MJ also continued at Alive 90.5, working as a board member and the chair of the station's Digital Content Committee. The program ran until the end of 2018 and MJ remained on the board until April 2018.

=== SWR Triple 9 (2018–2019) ===
The radio show moved to SWR Triple 9 in April 2018, broadcasting on 99.9 FM to the Sydney metropolitan every Monday night from 6 pm to 8 pm local time. The move to SWR Triple 9 saw the show extended by an hour to a 2-hour time slot and experiment with a simultaneous live video format.

The move from Thursdays on Alive 90.5 to Mondays on SWR Triple 9 allowed MJ to undertake studies at the Australian Film Television Radio School.

On 25 June 2018, Hawkesbury Gold 89.9 FM begun syndicating Planet Country on Tuesday afternoons from 4 pm.

=== Hiatus (2019–2020) ===
On 6 May 2019, Big Stu & MJ announced a temporary hiatus of the show so MJ could take up work in commercial radio, as the new Breakfast Announcer at 93.5 Eagle FM in Goulburn.

Planet Country returned for one pre-recorded episode later in the month before returning to hiatus. It was revealed on their website that a family member of the hosts suffered a medical emergency and as a result the show would continue on hiatus. The show remained on hiatus until May the following year when they returned for a live video special.

=== Live at the Ranch (May 2020) ===
Big Stu & MJ returned for a one-off live video talk show on 16 May 2020, close to a year since the hiatus began. The show was presented at 'The Ranch', a video production facility in south-west Sydney. This video special followed a similar format to the SWR Triple 9 radio show. Audio from the live video was simulcast on The Wolf Australia. No plans for a full-time return have been confirmed.

== Commercial Radio ==
The show entered a broadcast hiatus when co-host MJ moved into commercial radio. Between 2019 and 2021 he hosted the Breakfast show on 93.5 Eagle FM in Goulburn. In 2021 he was the Production Manager at 2CC and 2CA in Canberra. Since 2022 he has been the Workday Announcer & Operations Manager at 96.5 Wave FM in Wollongong.

== On demand ==
Full episodes of Planet Country can be streamed on demand through podcasting platforms spotify, iHeartRadio, iTunes, Tune In and Spreaker.

== Music for a New Generation Awards ==
Planet Country present their own awards program called the 'Music for a New Generation Awards', colloquially known as 'The M-Fangs'. The awards recognise modern crossover country artists for their efforts throughout the year. The awards have run annually every December since 2015.

The first year of the awards was 2015 and featured 7 categories with finalists and winners chosen by Big Stu and MJ. The awards are split into International industry and Australian industry categories. Eligibility is based on where an artist primarily tours or promotes themselves. For example, Keith Urban is placed in the International industry despite his Australian nationality.

In 2016, the awards continued with the addition of an 8th category (New Artist of The Year was split into International and Australian) and the addition of two fan voted categories: Fan's International Artist of The Year and Fan's Australian Artist of The Year. Keith Urban and Troy Kemp won each vote respectively.

In 2017, the award process was reversed with 8 categories all becoming fan voted and the introduction of two 'Impact Award' categories being awarded by Big Stu and MJ. The two Impact Award categories were 'Industry Impact Award' and 'Media Impact Award'.

In 2018, the awards continued as is but with the 'New Artist' categories renamed to 'Emerging Artist'. The 2018 awards were the final awards to be given out to date, due to the show's hiatus between 2019 and 2020.

The trophy won by award winners is dubbed the 'shattered CD'. A metaphor for crossover artists revolutionising country music and the compact disc becoming out-dated technology.

As of the 2018 awards, the categories and winners are:

Music for a New Generation Award Categories & Winners
| Award | Process | 2018 Winners | 2017 Winners | 2016 Winners | 2015 Winners |
|---|---|---|---|---|---|
| Australian Male Artist of The Year | A | Casey Barnes | Lee Kernaghan | Troy Kemp | Troy Kemp |
| Australian Female Artist of The Year | A | Hayley Jensen | Christie Lamb | Caitlyn Shadbolt | Tori Darke |
| Australian Group/Duo of The Year | A | The Wolfe Brothers | The Wolfe Brothers | Deep Creek Road | Victoria Avenue |
| Australian New Artist of The Year | A | N/A | Cassidy Rae Gaiter | Missy Lancaster | N/A |
| Australian Emerging Artist of The Year | B | Jase Lansky | N/A | | |
| International Male Artist of The Year | A | Keith Urban | Luke Bryan | Keith Urban | Brett Eldredge |
| International Female Artist of The Year | A | Carrie Underwood | Kelsea Ballerini | Carrie Underwood | Kelsea Ballerini |
| International Group/Duo of The Year | A | Florida Georgia Line | Lady Antebellum | Florida Georgia Line | Florida Georgia Line |
| International New Artist of The Year | A | N/A | Brett Young | Maren Morris | Clare Dunn* |
| International Emerging Artist of The Year | B | Catherine McGrath | N/A | | |
| Fan Voted Australian Artist of The Year | B | N/A | | Troy Kemp | N/A |
| Fan Voted International Artist of The Year | B | N/A | | Keith Urban | N/A |
| Media Impact Award | C | Kora Naughton | Casey Barnes | N/A | |
| Industry Impact Award | C | Jase Lansky | Josh Setterfield | N/A | |

A = Fan voted but previously awarded by Big Stu and MJ. B = Fan Voted. C = Awarded by Big Stu and MJ.

*The award was for both international and Australian industry artists in 2015.

== Recognition ==
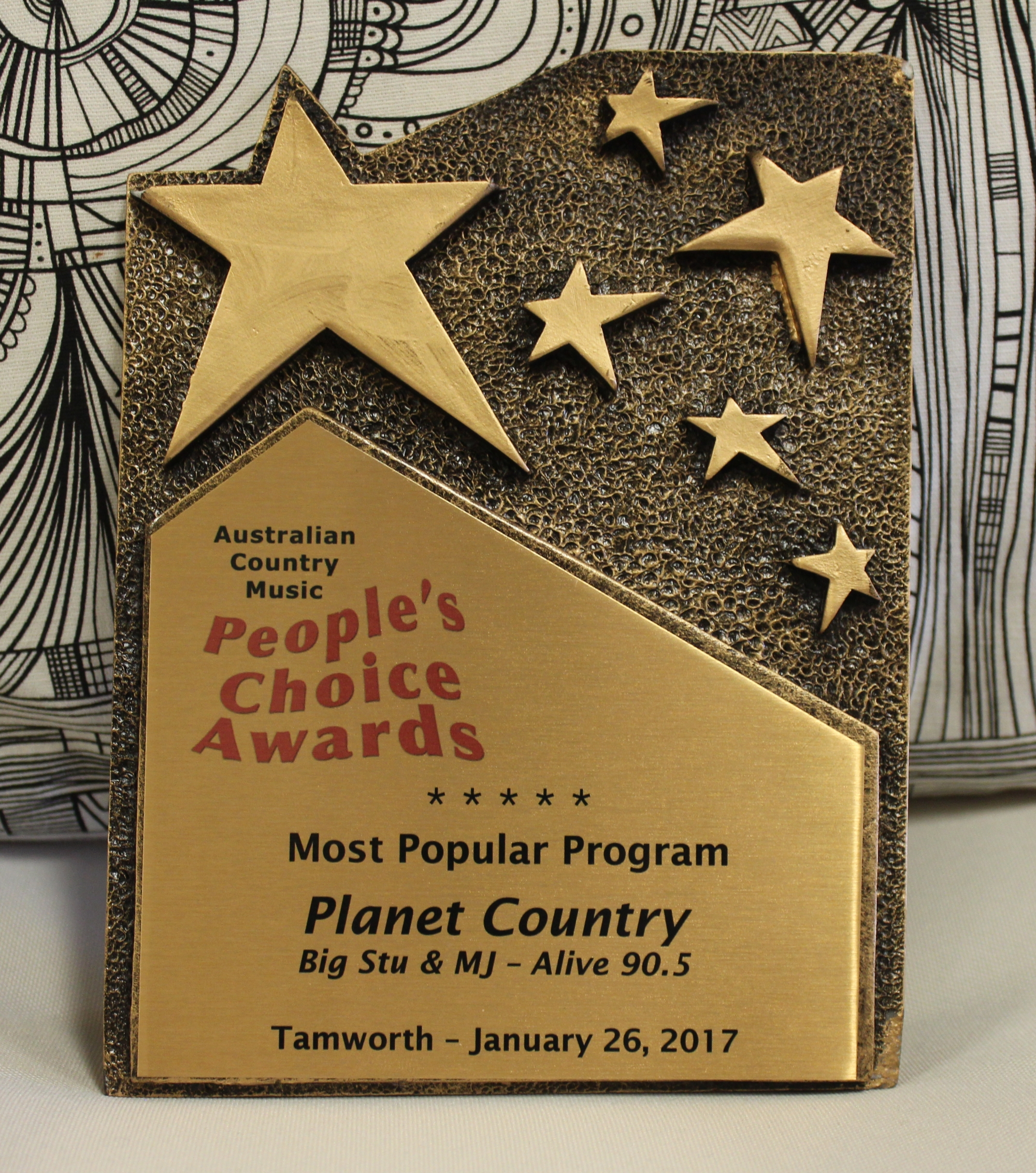
A photo of the 2017 Australian Country Music People's Choice Award for Most Popular Radio Program won by Planet Country.

In January 2017, the program won a people's choice award at the Tamworth Country Music Festival. The award was for Most Popular Country Music Station or Program.

Planet Country had been finalists in 2016 and 2018 as well.

In August 2019, it was announced that MJ was a finalist in the CBAA Awards for 2019, in the 'Excellence in Technical Services' category for his continued work at the program's former station Alive 90.5, where he was a board member. The award winners will be announced at a gala dinner in Melbourne in late October 2019.

| Year | Nominee / work | Award | Result |
|---|---|---|---|
| 2016 | Planet Country | Australian Country Music People's Choice: Favourite Radio Program/Station | Finalist |
| 2016 | Planet Country | Australian Country Music People's Choice: Favourite Radio Presenters | Finalist |
| 2017 | Planet Country | Australian Country Music People's Choice: Favourite Radio Program/Station | Won |
| 2017 | Planet Country | Australian Country Music People's Choice: Favourite Radio Presenters | Finalist |
| 2018 | Planet Country | Australian Country Music People's Choice: Favourite Radio Program/Station | Finalist |
| 2018 | Planet Country | Australian Country Music People's Choice: Favourite Radio Presenters | Finalist |
| 2019 | Matthew 'MJ' Brokenbrough | CBAA Award for Excellence in Technical Services | Finalist |

== Appearances ==
In 2017, both Big Stu and MJ made cameo appearances in the music video for 'Right Next To Me' by Australian country-rock artist Jay Seeney.

In 2018, country-rock artist Benn Gunn unveiled the album cover for 'Only in Australia' which featured many different media personalities from the Australian country music scene including a photo of MJ in one of the radio studios at the Australian Film Television and Radio School where he studies.

== See also ==
- Australian country music
- Australian radio
- Planet Country, album by Lee Kernaghan
