= 2GL =

2GL may refer to:

- Second-generation programming language, a form of computer language
- 2GL (Radio), a radio station in Australia
