= Alive 90.5 =

Radio station in Baulkham Hills, Sydney, Australia

Coordinates: 33.775477°S 150.934257°E

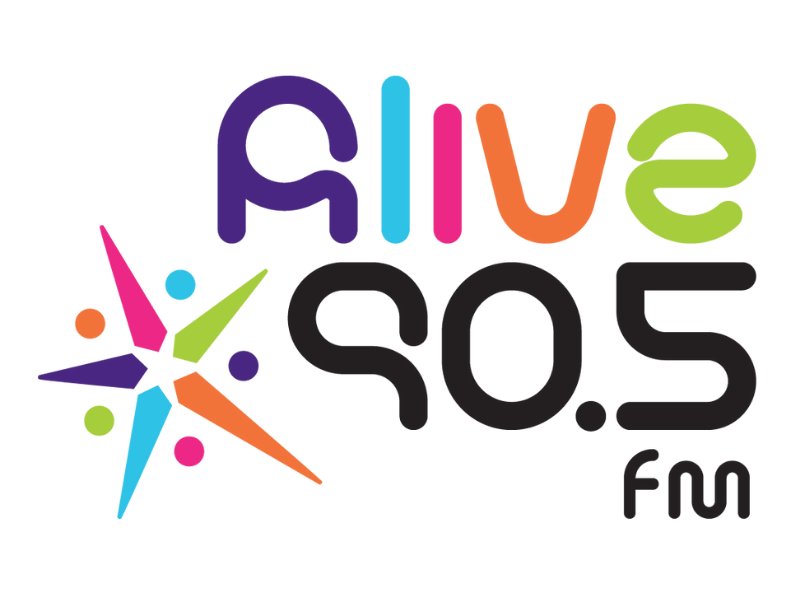
- Baulkham Hills, New South Wales; Australia
- Broadcast area: Parramatta, Cumberland and the Hills
- Frequency: 90.5 MHz

Programming
- Format: Adult contemporary, Community radio
- Affiliations: CBAA

Ownership
- Owner: Cumberland Community Radio Inc.

History
- First air date: 12 December 1992
- Call sign meaning: 2 for New South Wales Cumberland Community Radio

Technical information
- Licensing authority: ACMA
- ERP: 200 watts

Links
- Public licence information: Profile
- Webcast: Listen live
- Website: Official website

Alive 90.5 (call sign 2CCR) is a community radio station based in Baulkham Hills in Sydney. The station broadcasts to the Hills District and parts of Greater Western Sydney. This includes the City of Parramatta, Cumberland City Council and The Hills Shire. The traditional custodians of this land are the Bidjigal people, a clan of the Darug nation.

== About ==
Since 1992, Cumberland Community Radio has been broadcasting on 90.5 MHz FM. Originally branded on air as 'The Sound of Style' and later just '2CCR', the station has been known as Alive 90.5 since 4 November 2011.

The mission of Alive is to serve its community by broadcasting a diverse range of programs, suited for all groups in the community. Alive 90.5 is a volunteer run organisation and is funded through listener support, grants and limited commercial sponsorship.

The station airs a predominately Adult Contemporary music format on weekdays between 6am and 6pm local time with public access programs between 6pm and midnight on weekdays and various times on weekends. Overnight is a mix of Adult Contemporary and Oldies. Occasionally live sports commentary will replace weeknight programming and weekend programming.

== History ==
In the 1980s, Cumberland Community Radio was formed from the amalgamation of two groups attempting to set up community radio stations. One group in the Hills and the other in the Parramatta/ Holroyd region. Between 1987 and 1989, the organisation begun test broadcasts. In 1988, Baulkham Hills Shire Council allocated Building 9 in the Balcombe Heights Estate to the organisation, the station has remained in this location since. In October 1992, the organisation was granted a community radio licence and on 12 December 1992 begun broadcasting on 90.5 FM.

From April 2009, Alive 90.5 commenced streaming of its programs live, over the internet. There are two internet streams: 128 kbit/s Joint Sterero MP3 and 64 kbit/s stereo AAC, to support a variety of listening client programs.

The broadcast area originally served by Alive 90.5 included the City of Holroyd. In late 2017, Alive 90.5 updated their logo and broadcast area to include the newly formed Cumberland Council. The new council was formed in May 2016 from the merger of City of Holroyd with its neighbours.

Alive 90.5 reached its 25th anniversary on 12 December 2017.

== Current programming ==
The station's current programs cover a wide range of music styles including adult contemporary, jazz, country and easy listening. Alive 90.5 also broadcasts programs that are presented by special interest groups representing interests in Australian music, sport and broadcast in languages other than English. Interview style programs are also included during the day in the week.

Examples of these programs include:

- Rajesh Batra
- Hit Mix
- The Australian Spectrum Show
- Sunday Sports Roundup
- Positive Energy Show
- Pick 'n' Mix
- The HDD Show

== Recognition ==
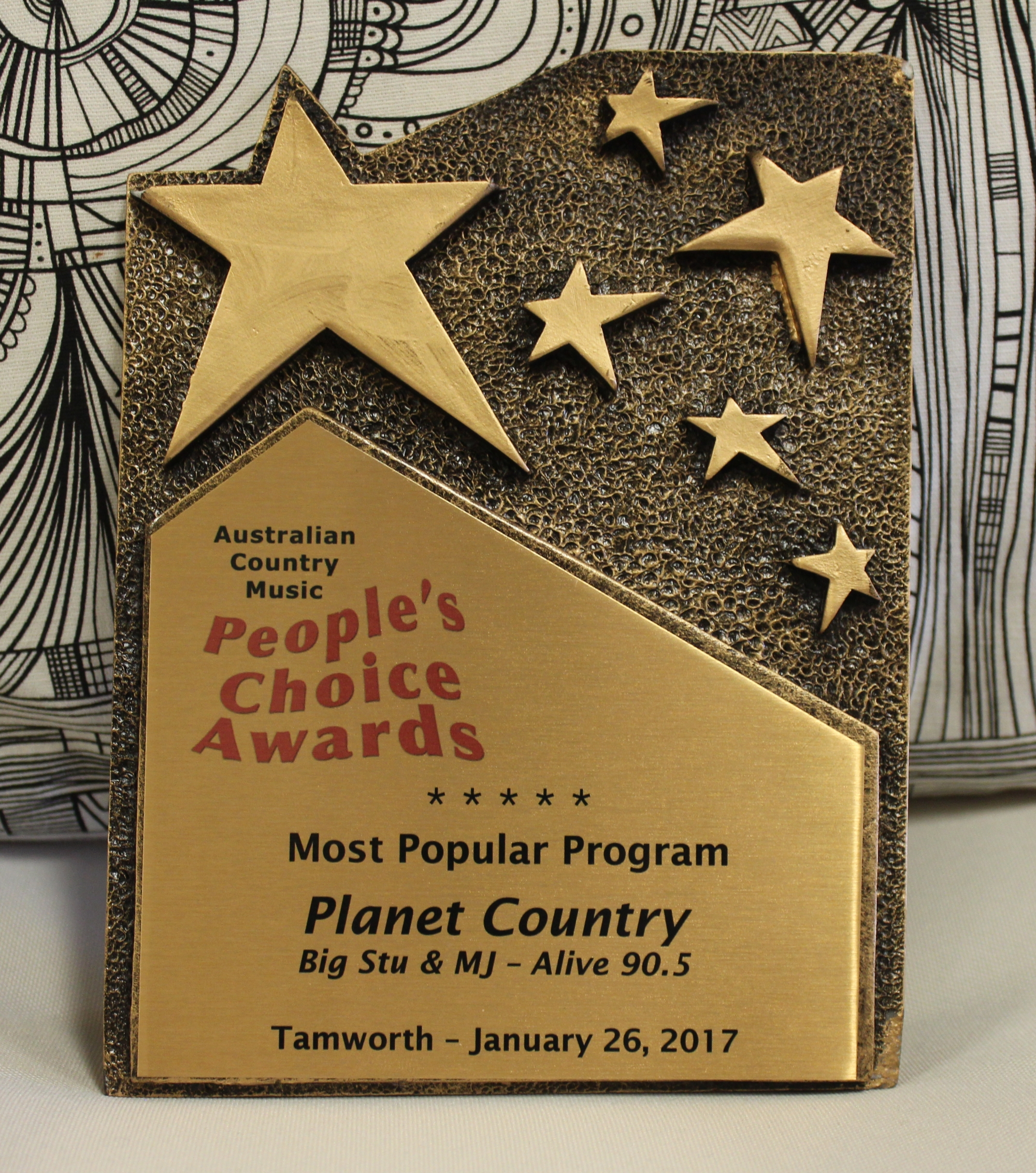
The Planet Country People's Choice Award trophy

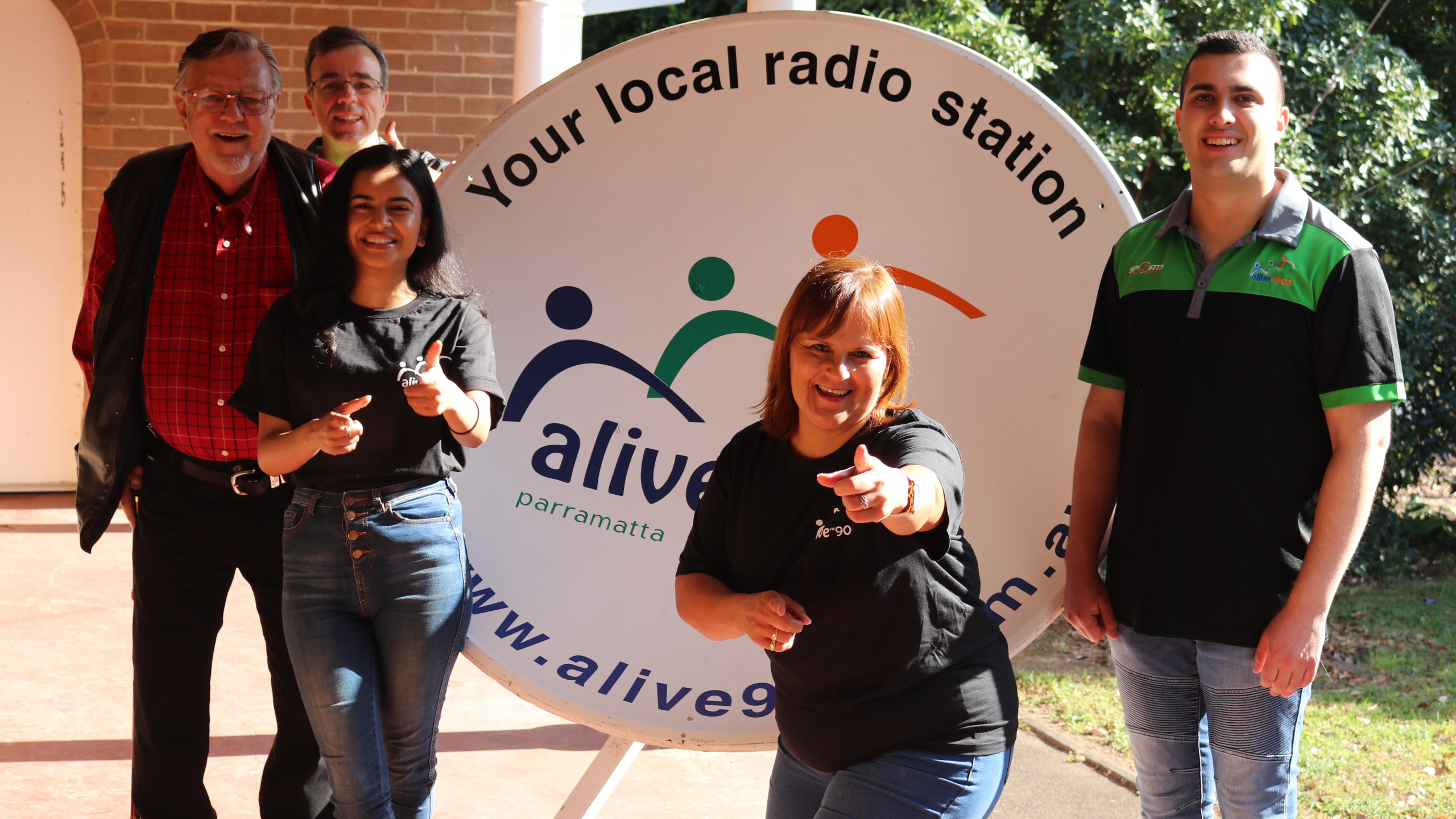
Radio Award Finalists

On 26 January 1995, 2CCR was awarded an Australia Day award for 'Outstanding Community Service'.

In January 2017, Planet Country with Big Stu & MJ, won a people's choice award at the Tamworth Country Music Festival. The award was for Most Popular Country Music Station or Program. Planet Country had been finalists in 2016 and 2018 as well.

In November 2018, Alive 90.5 program Sunday Sports Roundup were announced as winners of the 'Troy Garner Excellence in Sports Programming' award in the 2018 CBAA Awards, held on the Gold Coast.

In August 2019, Alive 90.5 continued their recognition at the CBAA Awards with two finalists announced. Former board member Matthew Brokenbrough, was announced as a finalist for in the 'Excellence in Technical Services' category whilst program Mediterranean Mix was a finalist in the 'Best Radio Program: Music' category. The awards will be held in Melbourne in October 2019.

In 2020 Alive 90.5 were again recognised in the CBAA Awards with 5 finalists announced.

In 2021 Darryn Capes-Davis was a finalist in the CBAA Community Radio Volunteer of the Year - People's Choice Award.

In 2021 Alive 90.5 FM returned to the winners circle in the CBAA Awards with the station winning the Outstanding Small Station Award and Darryn Capes-Davis winning the Outstanding Volunteer Contribution Award.

== Former presenters and programming ==
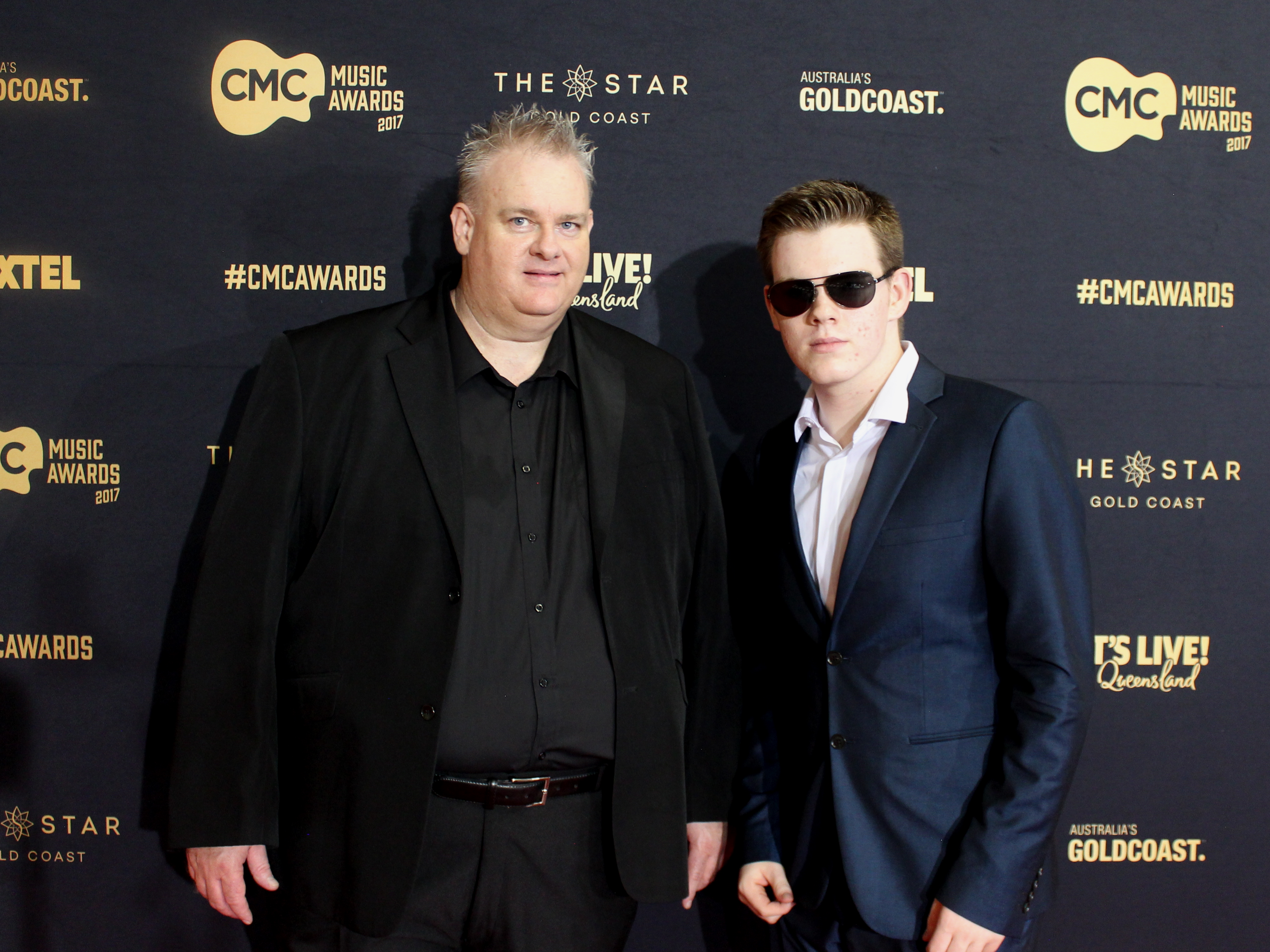
Big Stu & MJ, hosts of former Alive program Planet Country with Big Stu & MJ

=== Tim Wong See ===
Tim Wong See was a former presenter and board member with Alive 90.5 before moving to Brisbane to work as an announcer on Nova 106.9. Before joining Alive 90.5, Wong-See made news for operating his own pirate radio station from his home. He now works for ABC Sunshine Coast as a morning show producer after briefly working with ABC Gold Coast and SBS.

=== Planet Country ===
Alive 90.5 was originally home to country music program Planet Country with Big Stu & MJ. During its time on Alive 90.5, the program was finalists in and won a People's Choice Award (see Recognition). The program moved to SWR Triple 9 in 2018 to accommodate MJ's study schedule at the Australian Film Television Radio School. Both continued as members of Alive 90.5 and Big Stu briefly presented a spin-off program in the original time slot called Country Universe. MJ has since moved into commercial radio.

=== MJ ===
Matthew Brokenbrough, known on air as 'MJ' was former Alive 90.5 presenter and board member. A graduate of AFTRS, MJ has moved into commercial radio. Starting out as the Breakfast Announcer on 93.5 Eagle FM in Goulburn, he then was a commercial producer at Canberra's 2CC and 2CA and remotely announcing on Eagle FM and Snow FM. Following Canberra, MJ moved to Wollongong's 96.5 Wave FM where he is currently the Workday Announcer & Operations Manager.

At Alive 90.5, MJ coordinated the move to new playout software including training presenters and programming requirements. This earned him a nomination in the 2019 CBAA Awards in the 'Excellence in Technical Services' category. MJ also designed and built a new station website.

== Notable Past Announcers ==
Former presenters who have gone on to work professionally in radio include:

- Matthew 'MJ' Brokenbrough, currently the Workday Announcer on 96.5 Wave FM.
- Brooke Taylor, Drive Producer for CADA.
- Tim Wong See, Producer from ABC Sunshine Coast
- Scott Frappell - Drive Announcer at C91.3FM (Former Traffic Reporter for Australian Traffic Network).
- Dan Jones, formerly an Announcer with i98
- James Preston, formerly the Workday Announcer for Triple M (Port Macquarie)
- Mitchell Farrugia, Fox Sports

== Association and Membership ==
Alive 90.5 is run by Cumberland Community Radio Inc. and governed by its constitution.

In 2021 Alive 90.5 introduced Perkbox as a benefit to members. This allows discounts to many businesses including grocery, electrical and homeware stores, as well as other benefits which are known as Perks.

From 2020 members have been able to join and renew online.

=== Board ===
The board of Alive 90.5 consists of chair, deputy chair, treasurer, secretary and 5 general members of the board.

Board as of November 2022

- Andsley Dennis (Chair)
- Steven Gabris (Deputy chair)
- Julie Jordan (Secretary)
- Rima Saba (Treasurer)
- Jason Spindlow
- Nathan Cassar
- Leonie Dixon
- Angelina Rossi

== Funding ==
Alive 90.5 is funded from three main sources: membership fees, air fees, partnership/sponsorship income.

Alive 90.5 has 15 or more active partners at any one time including local business and sports teams. Partnership levels are divided into 3 main levels (Grow, Explore, Establish) and 3 sub levels (Tactical, Strategic, Visionary), providing for partnership durations from 3 months through to 12 months.

== See also ==
- List of Sydney radio stations
