= GGZ =

GGZ may refer to:

- GGZ Nederland, Dutch Association of Mental Health and Addiction Care
- Global Georgian Airways (ICAO: GGZ), defunct airline

== See also ==
- 2GGZ, callsign of community radio station, Mount Helen FM 101.7/107.3
