= Catholic Broadcasting Company =

Catholic Broadcasting Company is an Australian media company that owned various radio stations between 1937 and the 1990s.

It was a part of the Catholic Archdiocese of Sydney.

== Stations ==
Its flagship station, 2SM, was named after St Mark's Church in the archdiocese.

Other stations owned by the CBC included 2NX Newcastle and 2NM Muswellbrook.
