= 2EARfm =

Australian community radio station

Coordinates: 35°55′23.9″S 150°4′36.6″E

2EARfm is a community radio station, based in Moruya, on the Far South Coast of New South Wales, Australia.

EAR, an acronym for "Eurobodalla Access Radio", is located in the Eurobodalla Shire and has been broadcasting on frequencies 107.5 and 102.9 MHz for more than 30 years.

The station's broadcasters, presenters and all other staff are volunteers. Funds to operate the station are generated through sponsorship, fund raising events, donations and annual membership subscriptions.

2EARfm is owned and operated by EAR Inc, a not for profit community organisation. The organisation is controlled by an annually elected Management Committee and all volunteers must be members of EAR Inc. Membership is open to anybody who lives in or works in the Eurobodalla Shire or has an interest in promoting the region through community radio. The station is a member of the Community Broadcasting Association of Australia (CBAA).

== See also ==
- List of radio station callsigns in New South Wales
