= ABC Western Plains =

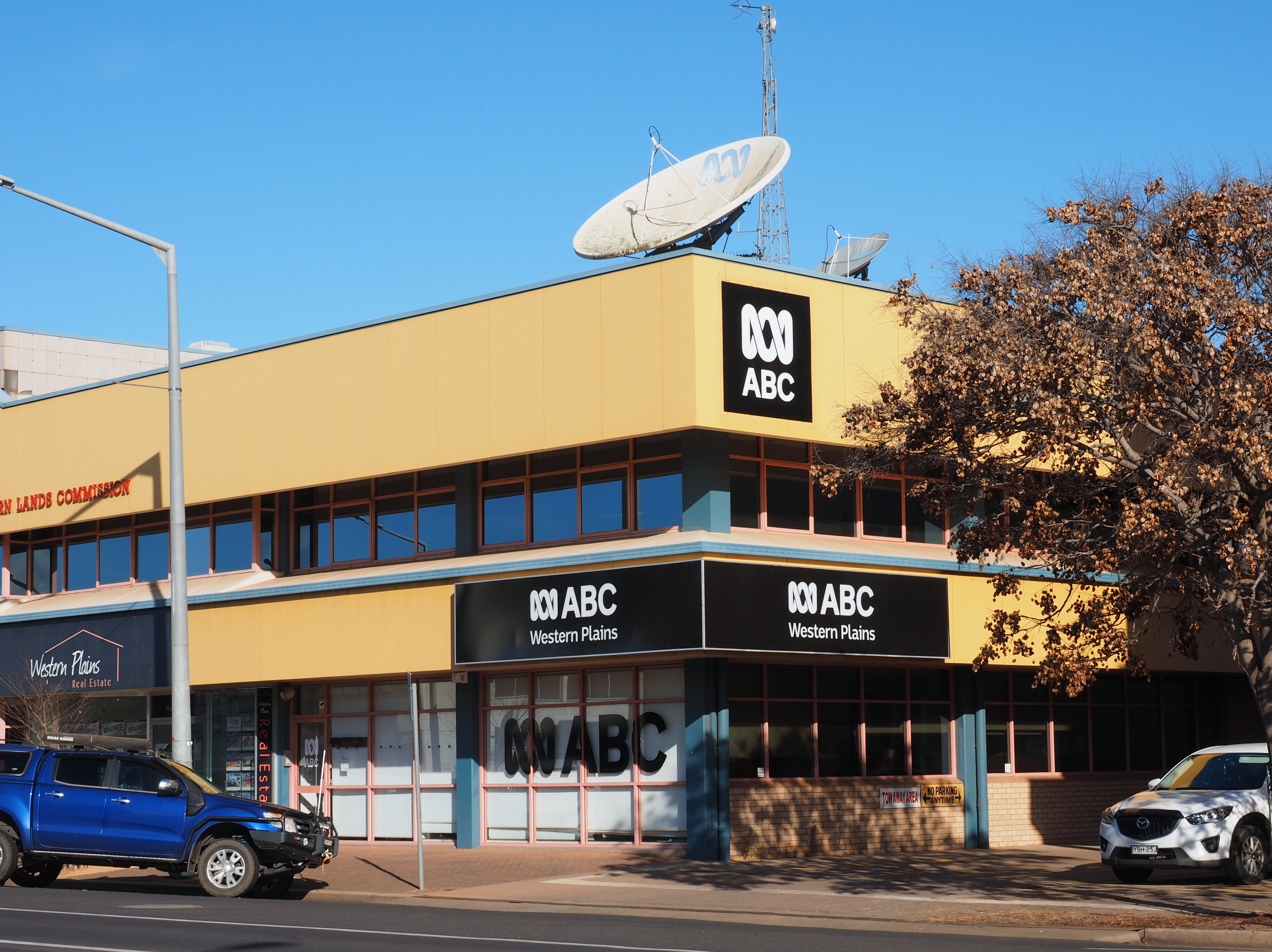
- Australia
- Broadcast area: Western Plains and Norfolk Island
- Frequencies: 95.9 mHz FM Dubbo and Norfolk Island; 107.1 mHz FM Central Western Slopes; 657 kHz AM Far West; 1584 kHz AM Far West

Programming
- Format: Talk

Ownership
- Owner: Australian Broadcasting Corporation

History
- First air date: 17 May 1993

Technical information
- Transmitter coordinates: 32°14′58.33″S 148°36′07.15″E

Links
- Website: https://www.abc.net.au/westernplains/

ABC Western Plains is an ABC Local Radio station based in Dubbo, New South Wales. The broadcast region stretches from Wellington north to Goodooga and west from Coonabarabran to Wilcannia. The station covers the top half of the Far West region and part of the Orana region of New South Wales. This includes Dubbo City and the towns of Bourke, Cobar, Nyngan, Walgett, Lightning Ridge, Gilgandra, Coonamble and Warren as well as Norfolk Island.

The station also provides services to isolated communities via satellite such as Ivanhoe, Menindee, Talbingo, Khancoban and even Norfolk Island.

ABC Western Plains began operating in 1993 taking over the western and outback region previously covered from Orange by ABC Central West.

In 2008 the station gained full regional status and is now self managed. This saw the establishment of a local morning show.

The station is heard on these main FM and AM frequencies along with a number of low-power FM repeaters:

- 2WPR 95.9 and 107.1 FM
- 2BY 657 AM
- 2WA 1584 AM

== See also ==
- List of radio stations in Australia
