= ABC Upper Hunter =

- Australia
- Broadcast area: Upper Hunter
- Frequencies: 1044 kHz AM and 105.7 mHz FM Upper Hunter; 101.9 mHz FM Merriwa; 96.9 mHz FM Murrurundi

Programming
- Format: Talk

Ownership
- Owner: Australian Broadcasting Corporation

History
- First air date: 1964 (as relay of 2NC); 1990 (local programs commenced)

Technical information
- Transmitter coordinates: 32°15′46.94″S 150°53′17.53″E

Links
- Website: ABC Upper Hunter

ABC Upper Hunter (call sign: 2UH) is an Australian radio station. It is the Upper Hunter service of the ABC Local Radio network, and serves Muswellbrook and surrounding areas.

== History ==
ABC Upper Hunter commenced as a local relay of Newcastle's 2NC (now ABC Newcastle) in 1964. While there was some local information on the station, the reporter responsible was based in Newcastle. It wasn't until 1990 when a local office of the ABC was established in the Upper Hunter, basing itself in Market Lane Muswellbrook. Mike Pritchard joined the broadcaster from the Scone Advocate newspaper, and was the station's rural reporter until his retirement in 2021, even acting as the lone employee in the region on occasion. In 1997, the station moved to its current facilities in Brook Street.

Throughout 2009, the station's programming went on hiatus while the studios were upgraded with digital equipment. Rural programming came from ABC New England North West, while local news and other programming continued to originate from ABC Newcastle. Regular programming resumed mid-year once the upgrade was complete.

== Frequencies ==
ABC Upper Hunter transmits on both the AM and FM bands from four transmitter sites in the Upper Hunter.

The main AM signal, with the callsign 2UH (as in Upper Hunter), operates on 1044 kHz, and reaches most of the Upper Hunter. This signal is transmitted from the Broadcast Australia site on Sandy Creek Road just outside Muswellbrook.

The station relays its programs on the FM band from three transmitter sites, all using the callsign 2HVR (as in Hunter Valley Radio).

FM Frequency	Transmitter Site	Area Served
105.7 MHz	Rossgole Lookout, Aberdeen	Muswellbrook, Scone, Aberdeen and Singleton
101.9 MHz	Banderra Downs, Merriwa	Merriwa
96.9 MHz	Mt Helen, Murrurundi	Murrurundi

== Programming ==
The station produces a daily breakfast program between 6:30 am and 8:00 am weekdays, with local news bulletins at 6:30 am and 7:30 am. Supplementary news bulletins are provided by ABC Newcastle until 9 am.

The bureau's rural reporter also co-produces the daily Upper Hunter New England North West Rural Report with ABC New England North West's rural reporter, which airs from 6:15 am to 6:30 am weekdays.

The station broadcasts ABC Newcastle's Mornings and Drive programs, but diverts at midday to broadcast The Country Hour, followed by The World Today on a one-hour delay at 1.00 pm.

In mid-2009, the station broadcast an hour-long program called Upper Hunter Weekend, which previewed events in the Upper Hunter for the coming weekend. It was hosted by Silas Moss and Niav Owens. The station now broadcasts ABC Newcastle's Saturday Breakfast program, hosted by Craig Hamilton, between 6 am and midday.

In 2021, ABC Upper Hunter commenced streaming capabilities via a podcast service on its website.

The Radio National program Late Night Live occasionally broadcasts from these studios, as presenter Phillip Adams and his partner Patrice Newell own an organic farm in the area.

== On-Air Staff ==
- Amelia Bernasconi – Hunter Rural Reporter and Upper Hunter Breakfast presenter.

== Former Staff ==
- Mike Pritchard – Hunter Rural and Resources Report and breakfast presenter from 1990 to June 2021.

== See also ==
- 1233 ABC Newcastle

== Sources ==
- ABC Upper Hunter
- ACMA technical documents
