= Triple M The Border =

- Albury, New South Wales; Australia
- Frequency: FM: 105.7 MHz
- Branding: 105.7 Triple M

Programming
- Format: Mainstream rock
- Network: Triple M

Ownership
- Owner: Southern Cross Austereo; (Goulburn and Border Broadcasters Pty Ltd)
- Sister stations: Hit 104.9 The Border

History
- First air date: 31 July 1998 (as The River)
- Call sign meaning: BorDeR

Technical information
- Licensing authority: ACMA
- Class: Commercial
- ERP: 100,000 watts
- Transmitter coordinates: 36.253620°S 146.855115°E
- Repeaters: FM: 90.1 MHz Omeo; FM: 94.1 MHz Falls Creek; FM: 96.5 MHz Corryong

Links
- Website: www.triplem.com.au/theborder

Triple M The Border (ACMA callsign: 2BDR) is a commercial radio station owned and operated by Southern Cross Austereo as part of the Triple M network. The station is broadcast to townships along the New South Wales/Victoria border from studios in Albury.

The station commenced broadcasting on 31 July 1998 as The River, with its first song being Many Rivers to Cross by Toni Childs. On 15 December 2016, the station was relaunched as Triple M.

Current line-up:

6:00am-9:00am: Lu & Al

9:00am-2:00pm: Alo Baker

2:00pm-4:00pm: Lu & Jarch

4:00pm-6:00pm: The Rush Hour with JB & Billy

7:00pm-10:00pm: Triple M Nights with Dave Gleeson

10:00pm-1:00am: Homegrown with Matty O
