= Hit106.9 Newcastle =

Radio station in Newcastle, New South Wales, Australia

hit106.9
- Newcastle, New South Wales; Australia
- Broadcast area: Newcastle; Lake Macquarie; Hunter Valley; Central Coast
- Frequency: 106.9 MHz FM (1992–present)
- Branding: hit106.9

Programming
- Language: English
- Format: Hot AC
- Affiliations: Hit Network

Ownership
- Owner: Southern Cross Austereo; (Radio Newcastle Pty Ltd)
- Sister stations: Triple M

History
- First air date: 30 August 1937 (as 2HR); 1950s (as 2NX); 1990s (as 2XXX)
- Former call signs: 2HR (1937–1954); 2NX (1954–1992)
- Former frequencies: 1341 kHz AM (1978–1992)
- Call sign meaning: NXFM came from former 2NX callsign

Links
- Website: Official website

Hit106.9 (call sign: 2XXX) is a commercial FM radio station broadcasting in Newcastle, New South Wales, Australia, on a frequency of 106.9 MHz, and is part of Southern Cross Austereo's Hit Network.

== History ==
NXFM logo from 2005 to 2016

Hit106.9's history can be traced back to Singleton radio station 2SI, owned by Alex Mather (VK2JZ) and the Singleton Argus newspaper which never went to air. The licence was obtained by Hunter River Broadcasters Pty Ltd and changed to 2HR. The station launched on 30 August 1937. Shareholders included the Singleton Argus and the Robinson Family. Three years later, the station was moved to Maitland, with transmitter at Lochinvar.

In those days, 2HR operated on 680 kHz with 300 watts of power, and was affiliated with the Macquarie Broadcasting Network. Programs were originated locally between 6:30 am and 6:30 pm, before taking the Macquarie feed at 6:30 pm.

In the 1950s, 2HR was relocated to Newcastle, with its transmitter located in Bolwarra. Station manager Ken Robinson was a former Australian Army officer, and his identification number had the letters NX. Therefore, the station was given the callsign 2NX, and a new frequency at 1360 kHz .

In 1971, 2NX's owners Hunter Broadcasters were purchased by the Catholic Broadcasting Company, owned by the Catholic Church. 2NX programming still was relayed to 2NM overnight during this time, and was identified as 2NXNM.

In the early 1990s, the Catholic Church sold 2NX to Radio Newcastle, which was later taken over by Austereo, and then sold a 50% stake to RG Capital (which was taken over by Macquarie Bank). 2NX was granted a license to convert to FM in the 1990s and moved to 106.9 MHz, branding itself originally as X107, before changing to NXFM. In April 2011 Southern Cross Media bought out Austereo giving Southern Cross Media full ownership of NXFM.

On 15 December 2016, NXFM became known as hit106.9 in Southern Cross Austereo's mass re-branding of its regional radio network.

Hit 106.9 are a sponsor of local A-League team the Newcastle Jets.

== Current On-Air Schedule ==
Weekdays:

- Jess & Rohan, 6:00am to 9:00am
- Carrie & Tommy, 3:00pm to 6:00pm
- The Hot Hits, 7pm to 10pm (Monday-Thursday)
- RnB Fridays, 12:00pm to 3:00pm (Fridays)

Saturdays:

- Various Announcers, 9:00am to 7:00pm
- Saturday Night Party Playlist, 7:00pm to 12:00am

Sundays:

- Various Announcers, 9:00am to 7:00pm
- Australian Music, 7:00pm to 12:00am
