= ABC North Coast =

- Australia
- Broadcast area: Northern Rivers
- Frequencies: 738 kHz AM Grafton and Clarence Valley; 720 kHz AM Tweed Valley; 94.5 mHz FM Lismore and Northern Rivers; 91.3 MHz FM Bonalbo

Programming
- Format: Talk

Ownership
- Owner: Australian Broadcasting Corporation

History
- First air date: 17 July 1936

Technical information
- Transmitter coordinates: 28°48′09.32″S 153°17′31.10″E

Links
- Website: https://www.abc.net.au/northcoast/

ABC North Coast is an ABC Local Radio station based in Lismore and broadcasting to the Northern Rivers region in New South Wales. This includes the towns and cities of Grafton, Ballina, Byron Bay, Casino and Murwillumbah.

Even though Tweed Heads is in the Northern Rivers region, the city is covered by ABC Gold Coast since Tweed Heads is on the border with the Gold Coast.

The station began as 2NR in 1936 originally based in Grafton, moving to Lismore in 1989. It is heard on these main AM and FM frequencies:

- 2NR 738 AM (Grafton and Clarence Valley)
- 2ML 720 AM (Tweed Valley)
- 2NNR 94.5 FM (Richmond and the Tweed)
- 2WPR 91,3 FM (Bonalbo)

The station airs locally focused programming from 6 am to 11 am. At all other times, it airs programming relayed from ABC Radio Sydney, or regional programming that airs on all provincial Local Radio stations.

Technical information

2NR 738 AM 50,000 watts

2ML 720 AM 400 watts

2NNR 94.5 FM 100,000 watts

2WPR 91.3 FM 50 watts

== See also ==
- List of radio stations in Australia
