= ABC Newcastle =

- Newcastle, New South Wales; Australia
- Broadcast area: Newcastle; Maitland; Port Stephens; Cessnock; Lake Macquarie
- Frequencies: 1233 kHz; 95.9 MHz (Port Stephens)

Programming
- Language: English
- Format: News, talk, sports

Ownership
- Owner: Australian Broadcasting Corporation
- Sister stations: ABC Local Radio, ABC Upper Hunter

History
- First air date: 19 December 1930
- Former call signs: 2NC
- Call sign meaning: 2 – New South Wales; NC – Newcastle

Technical information
- Transmitter coordinates: 32°47′59.508″S 164°45′15″E

Links
- Webcast: Listen Live
- Website: www.abc.net.au/newcastle/

ABC Newcastle (call sign: 2NC) is an Australian radio station. It is the Newcastle station of the ABC local radio network, and is licensed to, and serving Newcastle and surrounding areas. It operates on the AM band at 1233 kilohertz. Formerly known by its callsign 2NC, the NC in the callsign is short for Newcastle, while the 2 represents the state of New South Wales. The station was established in 1930.

== History ==
2NC was the very first regional radio station in Australia outside a capital city. It was set up by Adrian Jose. The first broadcast occurred 19 December 1930, and played the Newcastle Symphony Orchestra playing the William Tell Overture. James Fenton acting as the prime minister of Australia gave a speech. Local Newcastle content was limited to an hour a week and included news, market reports and church services. The station was heard in New Zealand. Its original frequency was 1245 kHz or wavelength of 241 metres. The power was 2 kW with a modulation of 85%. The transmitting equipment was established by Keith Thow of STC. The transmitting antenna is at Beresfield. It was designed to have a range of 25 miles, covering a population of 200,000.

In 1931 2YB in New Plymouth, New Zealand was interfering with 2NC causing a heterodyne whistle.

Other early local content included the Newcastle Steel Works Band, the Newcastle Choral Society and the Newcastle Revellers.

For a time in the early 2000s, the ABC Newcastle website included a 5-day-a-week 5-minute TV news bulletin dedicated to Newcastle, shot in the ABC NSW studio.

The first studios were located behind the Old Strand Theatre on Market Street, before moving to 24 Wood Street.

== Programs ==
Its programs are also heard on ABC Upper Hunter, the ABC's station serving the Upper Hunter.

== Sports coverage ==
In addition to Grandstand's national coverage, ABC Newcastle and ABC Upper Hunter also broadcast Newcastle Knights rugby league and Newcastle Jets football games as well.

== See also ==
- ABC Upper Hunter
