= 2NM =

Coordinates: 32.263323°S 150.888821°E

- Muswellbrook, New South Wales; Australia
- Broadcast area: Upper Hunter Valley
- Frequency: 981 kHz AM
- Branding: 981 2NM

Programming
- Format: Classic hits Adult contemporary Talk radio Sports radio

Ownership
- Owner: ARN; (Radio Hunter Valley Pty Ltd)
- Sister stations: Power FM 98.1; 94.5 Hot Country

History
- First air date: 9 January 1937 (as 2CK); 14 January 1954 (as 2NM)
- Former call signs: 2CZ (proposed); 2CK (1937–1954)
- Former frequencies: 1460 kHz (1937–1978); 1458 kHz (1978–1980)
- Call sign meaning: derived from former sister station 2NX, also could stand for 2 Newcastle Muswellbrook

Technical information
- Power: 5 kW

Links
- Webcast: 2NM Online Stream
- Website: 2NM.com.au

2NM (branded as 981 2NM) is a local radio station in the Upper Hunter Valley of New South Wales, Australia. It is based in Muswellbrook and serves listeners in Muswellbrook, Singleton, Scone, Aberdeen, Merriwa, Murrurundi and surrounding areas.

The station transmits on 981 kHz on the AM band from a transmitter site located along Bengalla Road near Muswellbrook, near the Bengalla coal mine. Its studios, shared with sister stations 98.1 Power FM and low-powered narrowcast station 87.6MHz KIX Country, are located at 56 Brook Street, Muswellbrook. The Station moved from its old location at 100 Bridge Street in October 2018. The first live broadcast from the new studios was on Monday 29 October 2018. The station is owned by ARN.

2NM broadcasts an adult contemporary/classic hits music format, typically covering music from the 1960s through to today, focusing on 1970s to 1990s hits, aimed at an older audience. This is supplemented by local, rural and national news bulletins, a daily local affairs program, and programs sourced from Sydney station 2GB and from syndicated Nine Radio stations. All programs from 6am to 6pm weekdays and 6am to 12pm weekends are broadcast from the Muswellbrook studios, with longer hours of automated music during the summer months and public holidays.

== History ==
=== 1937–1950s – 2CK Cessnock ===
2NM was originally licensed to Cessnock as 2CZ, owned by Coalfields Broadcasting Co Pty Ltd, but the station's call letters were changed to 2CK prior to its launch on 9 January 1937. The station operated on 1460 kHz, with a power output of 300 watts, and was managed by Albert Ryan.

The station catered for the mining community of Cessnock and surrounding areas, and was the official station of the Australian Coal and Shale Employees' Federation. A feature of their programme was a mining news bulletin, transmitted at 5.34am, 6.15pm and 9.00pm, relying on information from mine officials and managements. Because of the working hours of the local industry, the station commenced operations at 5.30am, with the first national news program in the country for the day transmitted at 5.45am, using the resources of the Newcastle Herald.

This was complemented with local and district news, racing programs from 2UW, the Daily Telegraph Sports Parade program (exclusive to 2CK in the region) and other programs of local interest. The station transmitted between the hours of 5.30am and 11am and from 5.30pm to 10pm weekdays, 5.30am to 11pm Saturdays and 9.00am to 10.00pm Sundays.

2CK was closed down after a fire burnt the studios down late one night after the announcer had finished the station's transmission for the night at 10pm, and left in a rush for his bus back to Maitland, leaving the electric heater on.

=== 1937–1950s – 2HR Singleton/Maitland ===
The Upper Hunter had its own station based in Singleton, 2HR, owned by Hunter River Broadcasters Pty. Ltd. The station launched on 30 August 1937. The owners included the Singleton Argus and the Robinson family. Three years later, they moved to Lochinvar, near Maitland.

=== 1954–1980s – 2NM Muswellbrook / 2NX Newcastle ===
Hunter Broadcasters had purchased the two stations during the early to mid-1950s, and decided to move both stations away from their existing locations. The 2HR license and transmitter was moved to Bolwarra, in order to serve the Newcastle market. 2HR was given a new callsign, 2NX. The 2CK license and frequency was moved to Muswellbrook, and also received a new callsign, 2NM.

The callsigns were devised by station manager Ken Robinson, who had served in the Australian Army. His army identification number included the letters NX. Therefore, the Newcastle station was given the 2NX name. 2NM's callsign was created only after trying out other combinations that could smoothly follow 2NX. 2NM could also represent 2 Newcastle Muswellbrook.

2NM was launched on 14 January 1954, from facilities located along the McCully's Gap road just outside Muswellbrook.

In 1971, Hunter Broadcasters were taken over by Catholic Broadcasting Company, a division of the Catholic Archdiocese of Sydney. During this time, while during the day 2NX and 2NM were operated separately, from 6pm overnight, 2NM relayed 2NX's programming, and was identified as 2NXNM and as Upper Hunter 2NX.

In 1978, the station moved from 1460 to 1458 kHz, as part of a nationwide radio frequency adjustment. Two years later, on 2 August 1980, 2NM changed its frequency again from 1458 kHz to 981 kHz to improve reception in parts of the Upper Hunter. A new 5000 watt transmitter site was commissioned on Begalla Road, next to the Bengalla coal mine. The old 2NM tower on McCullys Gap Road was not torn down until 2009. The old transmitter building still stands to this day. 1458 kHz was reassigned as the Newcastle frequency for ABC NewsRadio.

The overnight simulcast of 2NX came to an end in July 1989, due to the opening of Newcastle's first FM station, New FM, which was taking listeners away from 2NX, and as a result, 2NX changed formats to compete.

=== 1990s–2021 – Independence and expansion ===
In the early 1990s, the station was sold to Grant Broadcasters, and moved to new studios in Muswellbrook. It is a breeding ground for young radio talent, names to come out of 2NM include: Brendan Jones 4MMM, 2MMM, and breakfast "Jonesy and Amanda" WSFM, Jamie Angel 2MMM Content director and Paul "The bull" Stanley. In the mid-1990s, the station opened a supplementary FM station, Power FM, on 98.1 kHz (coincidentally sharing the same numbers in its frequency as 2NM), which lead to 2NM focusing on an older demographic.

In 2009, the station began an online stream of its programming, along with sister station Power FM.

=== 2021–present – New ownership under ARN ===
In November 2021, 2NM, along with other stations owned by Grant Broadcasters, were acquired by the Australian Radio Network. This deal will allow Grant's stations, including 2NM, to access ARN's iHeartRadio platform in regional areas. The deal was finalized on 4 January 2022. It is expected 2NM will integrate with ARN's Pure Gold Network, but will retain its current name according to the press release from ARN.

== Programming ==
Weekdays

Time	Show
6.00am–10.00am	Breakfast with Bear
10.00am–12.00pm	The Morning Show with Al
1.00pm–5.00pm	The Drive Home with Pete
4.00pm–7.00pm	Jonesy & Amanda
7.00pm–8.00pm	The Christian O'Connell Show

Weekends

Time	Show
8.00am (Saturday)	Morning Glory with Matty Johns
3.00pm–6.00pm (Saturday) 7.00am–10.00am (Sunday)	This Week in Music

== Coverage area ==
2NM's primary coverage area is the Upper Hunter Valley of New South Wales, with its 5 kilowatt transmitter serving the shires of Muswellbrook, Singleton and the Upper Hunter Shire and surrounding areas. The signal reaches as far east as Maitland, and was even promoted as an alternative source of rugby league coverage by 2GB when former affiliate 2HD dropped the Continuous Call Team program in 2006. Even a local resident, "Elsie", had her transistor radio hooked up to receive 2NM by 2GB technical staff in a stunt run that year.

Those involved in distance reception of radio signals often note the ability of 2NM's signal to travel long distances in favourable conditions, with reports of reception in New Zealand (blocking out state radio services on occasion), as well as many parts of New South Wales and beyond.

== Former jingles and slogans ==
- In the Hunter Valley, north to Tamworth, east to the Barrington Tops and west to Cassilis, this is 981 2NM – used at the time of the 1980 frequency switch
- Upper Hunter 2NX – used during 2NX simulcast periods
- 2NXNM – used during 2NX simulcast periods
