= 2LM =

- Australia
- Frequencies: 900 KHz (AM); 104.3 MHz (FM)

Ownership
- Owner: Broadcast Operations Group

History
- First air date: 21 September 1936

Technical information
- Power: 5 KW
- Transmitter coordinates: 28.7655°S 153.3583°E (AM); 28.5725°S 153.0697°E (FM)

Links
- Website: www.zzz2lm.net.au

2LM is an Australian radio station serving Lismore, New South Wales. It opened in September 1936.

== History ==
=== 2CZ ===
2LM originated with the experimental transmitting station (callsign: 2CZ) operated by George Walter Exton. 2CZ was licensed from 1922 and transmitted amateur broadcasting programmes intermittently at low power from the mid 1920s. Exton claimed to have been experimenting with wireless since 1896, which, if correct would make him one of Australia's earliest wireless experimenters.

=== 2XN ===
Exton had been seeking a "B" class licence for Lismore since at least 1928. However, his application was not granted until the Postmaster-General's Department finalised its new two tier policy for Australian broadcasting following the 1927 Royal Commission into Wireless. The licence was eventually granted (callsign: 2XN) in 1930 and the licence was issued to Exton personally. The home town of the then Controller of Wireless (James Joseph Malone) in the PMG's Department was Lismore and during his many visits to the town, made acquaintance with Exton.

=== 2LM ===
2LM was founded by Richmond Rivers Broadcasters and supplanted 2XN Lismore (founded 1930 and operated on 1340 kHz), which the company purchased and closed down. As at 1987, it was owned by Hoyts.
