= C91.3 =

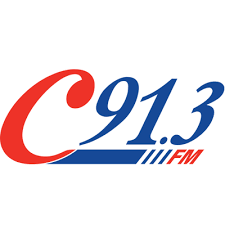
- The logo of C91.3

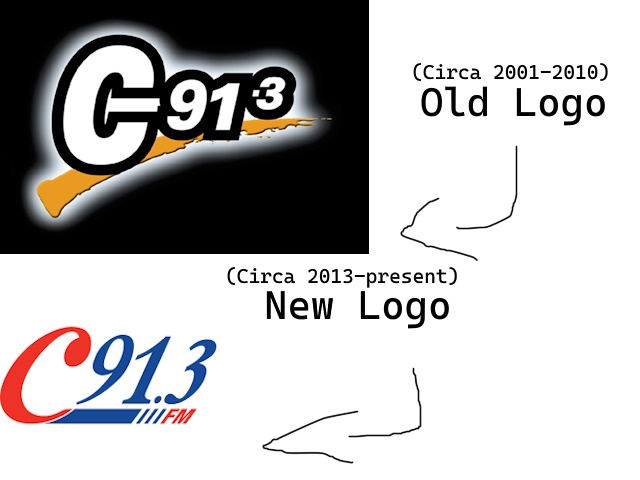
- Comparison of the old and new C91.3 logo
- Campbelltown, New South Wales; Australia
- Broadcast area: Campbelltown RA1
- Frequency: 91.3 MHz

Programming
- Language: English
- Format: Hot adult contemporary

Ownership
- Owner: WIN Corporation; (Campbelltown Radio Pty Ltd)
- Sister stations: i98FM

History
- First air date: 2001
- Call sign meaning: 2 – New South Wales; MACarthur Region

Technical information
- Licensing authority: Australian Communications and Media Authority

Links
- Website: c913.com.au

C91.3FM (ACMA callsign: 2MAC) is a commercial radio station broadcasting on the FM band at a frequency of 91.3 MHz to the Macarthur region of New South Wales in Australia. This area includes the major centres of Campbelltown and Camden. The station is owned by WIN Corporation, the parent company of WIN Television. Due to government regulations, it can only broadcast at 1 kW ERP so as to limit its broadcast area.

Many people feel that the station filled the gap left by the departure of Edge 96.1 and WSFM from Western Sydney studios. Studios for both supposed Western Sydney stations are now in North Ryde. C91.3 is the only commercial station left truly broadcasting from Western Sydney studios.

== History ==
Originally, when it started in 2001, the station played classic rock hits, with a little bit of current pop tracks, using the positioner "The Biggest Variety of Rock & Pop". In 2004, its music format shifted more towards CHR, and with it came a change of its positioner to "The Best Music in Macarthur". In early 2006, when Rob Doorey replaced Mal Lees (formerly of Triple M's Club Veg) & Mardi Cole, both now at other stations, for its breakfast slot, their positioner was changed to "Macarthur First".

The station features former Triple M jock, Stuart Cranney. From 2001 to 2005, he presented the "Classic 9 @ 9", in which he played 9 songs with a common theme. During 2006, the 9 to 10 am slot was taken up by the final hour of Rob Doorey's "Macarthur Breakfast" program, in which it is the "At Work Network" and therefore, the "Classic 9 @ 9" was dropped from the station's schedule. Despite the dropping of his famous program, Stuart Cranney remained on the station, in the 10 am to 2 pm slot, which was then moved back to 9 am to 12 pm in 2007, as the finishing time for "Macarthur Breakfast" was brought back earlier to 9 am. Stuart Cranney was made redundant by station management on 11 September 2008, but returned to the station in January 2011, presenting "Macarthur Breakfast" with Shano. Since his breakfast program finishes at 10 am, his popular 9 am music feature has also returned, now renamed "Cranney's 9 @ 9", since the "Classic 9 @ 9" name has been taken up by Sydney's classic hits station, WSFM. Chantel Armstrong replaced Stuart Cranney for the 9 am to 12 pm slot, before being replaced by Rob Doorey in 2010, who has moved from "Macarthur Breakfast".

During 2010, Jabba presented "Macarthur Breakfast" with Shano & Mike Goldman presented the local drive program. Both left the station by the end of the year, as they have refused to move to Campbelltown, as it was important for the station to be as local as possible.

In 2012 Christian McEwan was brought in from sister station i98FM to replace Glenn 'Stolzy' Stolzenhein on the After Hours Show. In early 2014 he was then promoted to Drive.

== Networking with i98FM ==
The station began increased networking with its sister station i98FM in the mid-2000s, however this has since largely come to an end. C91.3 has returned to live and local broadcasting in the last few years with i98's "The Backseat" replaced by a local drive program, presented by Mike Goldman. Mornings are now presented by Rob Doorey, Afternoons with Lyndal Rogers and March 2010 saw a new host for C91.3's Breakfast show – Jabba (formerly of Nova) with Shano.

In January 2012, the station dropped "After Hours with Stolzy" from i98 in favour of its local nights program, presented by Lyndal Rogers, who has moved from Afternoons. Come February 2012, Lyndal moved to do nights on C91.3's Wollongong sister station, i98FM.

In July 2012, Christian McEwan became full-time nights presenter replacing Glenn "Stolzy" Stolzenhein.

== Presenters ==
- Ally Redondo – Breakfast (5 am to 10 am)
- David Archer – Days (10 am to 3 pm)
- Scott Frappell – Drive (3 pm to 8 pm)
- Shano – weekends/fill in
- – Morning Traffic
- Erin Healey – Afternoon Traffic

News

Former C91.3FM journalists: Kate Zifovich, Bron Matherson, Michelle Wildner, Peter Hand, Lindsay Fisher, Kathy Koutzas, Greg (Hendo) Hendricks, Meredith Marks, Michelle Zydower, Renee Criddle, Krista Thomas, Mia Agius, Julieanne Horsman, Sally Prosser, Tracey Callaghan, Loni Cooper, James Cregan, Angela Anderson, Kate Mitchel, Paul Glover, Jonathan Lea, Beth Link, Michelle Taverniti & Kim Sexty

Hosts

Former C91.3FM announcers:

Silvio Roldan Christian McEwan, Annabella Leone, Stuart Cranney, Josh Webster, Lyndal Rogers, Chris Jarrold, Brad 'Coasty' Hunter, Mal Lees, Rob Duckworth, Marcus Paul, Maje Saba, Fairlie Hamilton, Bianca Dye, Jabba, Mike Goldman, Ryan Cram, Glenn "Stolzy" Stolzenhein, Greg Dimon, Jem Gold, Patrick "Captain Pat" McGeown, Byron Webb & John Backer.
