= Hit104.9 The Border =

Radio station in Albury, New South Wales, Australia

- Australia
- Broadcast area: Albury RA1
- Frequency: FM: 104.9 MHz Albury
- Branding: The Border's Hit104.9

Programming
- Language: English
- Format: Contemporary hit radio
- Affiliations: Hit Network

Ownership
- Owner: Southern Cross Austereo; (Radio Albury Wodonga Pty Ltd)
- Sister stations: Triple M 105.7 The Border

Technical information
- Licensing authority: ACMA
- ERP: 100,000 watts
- Transmitter coordinates: 36.253620°S 146.855115°E
- Repeaters: FM: 95.7 MHz Corryong; FM: 100.5 MHz Falls Creek

Links
- Public licence information: Profile
- Website: Official website

hit104.9 The Border (ACMA callsign: 2AAY) is an Australian radio station owned by Southern Cross Media. The station is based in Albury, New South Wales. Some programs based in Albury are simulcast to other Hit Network regional radio stations across the country.

On 14 December 2016, Southern Cross Austereo rebranded all of their regional Hit Network affiliated stations to one centralised "Hit" brand.

Current line-up:

6:00am-9:00am: Jess & Rohan

9:00am-12:00pm: Mornings with Bailey

12:00pm-3:00pm: Workday with Loues

3:00pm-6:00pm: Carrie & Tommy

6:00pm-7:00pm: Fifi, Fev & Nick

7:00pm-10:00pm: The Hot Hits with Nic & Loren
