= I98FM =

i98FM
- Wollongong, New South Wales; Australia
- Broadcast area: Wollongong RA1
- Frequency: 98.1 MHz FM

Programming
- Language: English
- Format: Hot adult contemporary

Ownership
- Owner: WIN Corporation; (WIN Radio Pty Ltd)
- Sister stations: C91.3FM

History
- First air date: 1 January 1979
- Former call signs: 2OO (1979–1992)
- Former frequencies: 1575 kHz AM (1979–1992)
- Call sign meaning: 2 – New South Wales; WIN Corporation

Technical information
- Licensing authority: Australian Communications and Media Authority
- Translator: Kevin Hall

Links
- Website: i98fm.com.au

i98FM (ACMA callsign: 2WIN) is a commercial radio station broadcasting on the FM band to the Illawarra region of New South Wales, Australia. It is owned by WIN Corporation, the parent company of WIN Television.

== History ==
The station was established as 2OO ("2 Double O") on 1 January 1979, broadcasting on 1575 kHz on the AM band. It initially competed with the established commercial station 2WL (now Wave FM), which had been broadcasting in the Illawarra since 1931. On 25 June 1992, 2OO converted to FM broadcasting and was relaunched as i98FM.

Since 1995, i98FM has consistently been one of the highest-rating radio stations in the Illawarra, holding the number-one position in most surveys, with the exception of two consecutive surveys in late 2002 and early 2003, when Wave FM took the lead.

The station began broadcasting live coverage of Illawarra Steelers matches following the team's entry into the New South Wales Rugby League competition in 1982. Following the merger of the Illawarra Steelers and St George Dragons in 1998–99, i98FM continued its own live coverage of St George Illawarra Dragons matches until 2001. In 2002, live Dragons coverage was replaced by the Continuous Call Team, relayed from Sydney station 2GB on Sunday afternoons.

=== On-air history ===
Notable on-air teams throughout i98FM's history have included Maroon & Milly (Breakfast), Alicia & Coastie (Breakfast), Marty & Erica (Breakfast), Marty, Erica & Stretto (Breakfast), Ryan Cram & Matt Smith (The Shift), Marty & Bianca (Breakfast), Marty & Fairlie (Breakfast), Marty, Christie & Crammy (Breakfast), and Maje & Fairlie (The Backseat, Drive).

Between October 2008 and 2009, i98FM underwent several programming changes. Bianca Dye joined the Breakfast Show, replacing Erica Hodge, while Maje Saba and Fairlie Hamilton formed the station's first male-female Drive duo, presenting The Backseat. Ryan Cram moved from evenings to afternoons, while Glenn "Stolzy" Stolzenhein joined from sister station C91.3FM to host the evening program After Hours. A weekend sports program, Game On, was also introduced, originally hosted by Tim "Robbo" Robinson until early 2012.

From October 2008, several i98FM programs were broadcast across both i98FM and its Campbelltown sister station, C91.3. These included Ryan Cram's afternoon program, The Backseat and After Hours. The arrangement was largely discontinued in January 2010, with After Hours remaining the only weekday program shared between the stations. By 2011, i98FM had ceased networking its programs to C91.3.

In 2012, the station introduced further lineup changes. Fairlie Hamilton departed The Backseat, Lyndal Rogers took over After Hours after 6 pm, and Paul Glover became host of the weekend sports program Game On. Simon Anderson succeeded Glover in 2013.

In 2015, Fairlie Hamilton returned to i98FM to co-host the Breakfast Show until 2017. The station subsequently introduced several changes to its Breakfast lineup, including Marty, Christie & Crammy in 2017 and Marty, Crammy & Lyndal in 2020.

=== Current programming and ratings ===
As of 2026, i98FM broadcasts a range of locally presented programs throughout the Illawarra region.

The station's weekday lineup is led by Christian McEwan and Bella Leone, who host Christian & Bella for Breakfast from 6 am to 9 am. Nath presents Workdays from 9 am to 2 pm, followed by long-serving i98FM personality Maje Saba, who hosts Drive from 2 pm to 7 pm. Ned & Josh present Ned & Josh at Night from 7 pm to 9 pm.

i98FM maintained its position as the Illawarra's number-one radio station in the 2025 and 2026 ratings surveys. In the October 2026 Xtra Insights Wollongong survey, the station recorded a 26.5% overall listener share among people aged 10 and over, ranking first across the major weekday programming periods.

Christian & Bella for Breakfast recorded a 28% audience share, while Nath's Workdays program achieved 25.6% in mornings and 28.6% in afternoons. Maje's Drive program recorded a 26.5% share. The station's total cumulative audience reached approximately 120,000 listeners.

i98FM continues to provide locally focused entertainment, news, community initiatives and coverage of major events throughout the Illawarra and South Coast.

=== i98FM Illawarra Convoy ===
In November 2012, i98FM's major annual charity event, then known as the Camp Quality Convoy, raised more than $1 million for Camp Quality charities in the Illawarra. Traditionally held on the third Sunday of November, the event continued to break fundraising records over the following years, raising $1,725,057 in 2015.

In 2016, the event was renamed the i98FM Illawarra Convoy, reflecting an expanded charitable focus and a commitment to supporting a broader range of individuals, families and community organisations throughout the Illawarra and South Coast.

The Illawarra Community Foundation was established to assist with distributing funds raised through the event to eligible local groups and individuals through an application process.

In 2018, the i98FM Illawarra Convoy raised more than $2 million for the first time. The following year, the event achieved a then-record fundraising total of $2,760,974.25.

Due to the COVID-19 pandemic, the 2020 vehicle convoy and Family Fun Day were replaced by Convoy at Home, a two-hour television special produced by the WIN Network.

In 2025, the i98FM Illawarra Convoy reached a significant fundraising milestone, surpassing $30 million raised since its establishment in 2005. The 2025 event raised $2,313,243, bringing the cumulative total to $30,006,878 over 21 years.

The 2025 Convoy featured 803 motorcycles and 817 trucks, with more than 12,000 people attending the Family Fun Day at Shellharbour Airport. The event included live entertainment, community activities and fundraising auctions, with proceeds supporting the Illawarra Community Foundation.

By 2025, the foundation had assisted more than 1,000 families affected by life-threatening or life-limiting medical conditions, alongside providing support to local charities and healthcare services throughout the Illawarra and South Coast.

The 2026 i98FM Illawarra Convoy was scheduled for 15 November, continuing the annual tradition of bringing together the region's trucking and motorcycle communities to raise funds for local families and charitable organisations.

The i98FM Illawarra Convoy has also received recognition at the Australian Commercial Radio Awards (ACRAs), winning the provincial category for Best Community Service Project ten times, first in 2008 and consecutively from 2010 to 2018.

The annual event remains a major community fundraising initiative, with proceeds supporting individuals and families facing life-threatening and life-limiting medical conditions.

=== i98FM Current Announcers ===
- 6 am to 9 am: i98 Breakfast with Christian and Bella
- 9 am to 2 pm: Workdays with Nath
- 2 pm to 7 pm: Drive Home with Maje
- 7 pm to 9 pm: Ned & Josh at Night

=== Former announcers ===
- Josh Webster (C91.3FM)
- Brendan Jones (WSFM's' Jonesy and Amanda)
- Anthony Maroon (Triple M Sydney)
- Erica Hodge (Southern Cross Austereo Perth)
- Dave "Stretto" Stretton
- Peter Hand
- Matt Smith (Foxtel)
- Glenn Stolzenhein
- Tim "Robbo" Robinson (WIN Television Wagga Wagga)
- Rod Poynter
- Christian McEwan (C91.3)
- Mia Agius (KIIS 106.5)
- Nicole Charlton
- Marcus Paul (2SM)
- Bianca Dye
- Robert Kendell
- George Ilich
- Peter Kaye
- Dean Matters
- Fairlie Hamilton (ABC Illawarra)
- Danielle Martin (Triple M Gold Coast)
- Lachlan Kitchen
- Christie Hayes
- Justin Coombes-Pearce
- Lyndal Rodgers
- Ryan Cram
