= 2GLF =

Liverpool, Sydney, Australia; Australia
- Frequency: FM: 89.3 MHz
- Branding: On Air, Online, On Demand

Programming
- Format: Community radio

Ownership
- Owner: Liverpool-Fairfield Community Radio Co-Op Ltd

Technical information
- Class: Community
- ERP: 80 watts
- HAAT: 18 m
- Transmitter coordinates: 33.9094°S 150.8980°E

Links
- Webcast: 2GLF Live Stream
- Website: Official website

2GLF is a Community radio station located in Liverpool, a suburb of Sydney. It is on 89.3 FM and caters to the communities of Liverpool and Fairfield LGA's.

== Etymology ==
GLF is an acronym which is the first letter of the two cities and community it represents:

- G — Green Valley, a suburb of Liverpool
- L — Liverpool which is a city located South – West of Sydney's main CBD
- F — Fairfield is the city which is north and adjacent to Liverpool and sits on the border of Sydney's West.

The number 2 of the call-sign refers to the state of New South Wales which has postcodes starting with 2. The three-letters GLF indicate an FM station whereas two-letters would indicate AM.

== Overview ==
The station provides several community language programs, community access time and a wide variety of music shows. These include:

- The Joys of Phillip Jaskiw morning variety on Fridays at 9am-12pm running, which has been airing since the mid 2000s.
- Retro Rewind on Thursday nights from 7pm
- The Radar youth show on Fridays between 4pm-5pm
- Late Night Live with Nick Nova and Tonka on Thursday nights at 10pm to 12am. The show boasts informative discussions on current affairs, local Liverpool and Fairfield news, music from all genres from the 80's, 90's, weather reports and traffic updates.
- Nohadra Radio, on Sunday nights from 8 pm to 10 pm, airs content for the Assyrian community in the Assyrian language. The show has been airing since 1998.
- Queer Out West — which airs every Monday night 10 pm – midnight, for the LGBTQI community of Western Sydney.
