= ABC Central West =

Australia
- Broadcast area: Central Tablelands
- Frequencies: 549 kHz AM Orange, Cowra and Parkes; 1395 kHz AM Lithgow; 90.3 MHz FM Goulburn; 94.1 MHz FM Bathurst and Portland; 96.5 MHz FM Young; 99.5 MHz FM Mudgee; 100.3 MHz FM Kandos and Rylstone; 106.9 MHz FM Crookwell

Programming
- Format: Talk

Ownership
- Owner: Australian Broadcasting Corporation

History
- First air date: 29 April 1937

Technical information
- Power: 50 kW
- Transmitter coordinates: 33°17′08.83″S 149°05′51.27″E

Links
- Website: www.abc.net.au/centralwest/

ABC Central West (call sign: 2CR) is the ABC Local Radio station for the Central Tablelands region, based in Orange, New South Wales, owned by the Australian Broadcasting Corporation. It broadcasts on 549 kHz on the AM band. The 549 kHz signal, from the transmitter at Cumnock, is one of the most powerful in Australia, with the coverage map on the ABC's reception website showing that the station can be heard in Northern Victoria and South Western Queensland during normal daytime conditions. This includes the towns and cities of Bathurst, Lithgow, Mudgee, Parkes, Blayney, Oberon, Gulgong, Portland and Goulburn.

== History ==
ABC Central West is one of the oldest stations of the ABC. The station opened on 29 April 1937 in the Strand Palais in Orange. It was attended by the Mayor of Orange, W.F. Matthews, the Postmaster-General, the Minister of Defence and a representative of the ABC. Entertainment for the night was provided by Jim Davidson and the ABC Dance Band, The Singing Pierrots, tenor Sydney MacEwan, yodeller Tex Morton and Auld Lang Syne.

The original studios were located at Lords Place, before being relocated to 46 Bathurst Road in East Orange. The station celebrated 70 years of broadcasts in 2007 and 80 years in 2017.
