= The Singleton Argus =

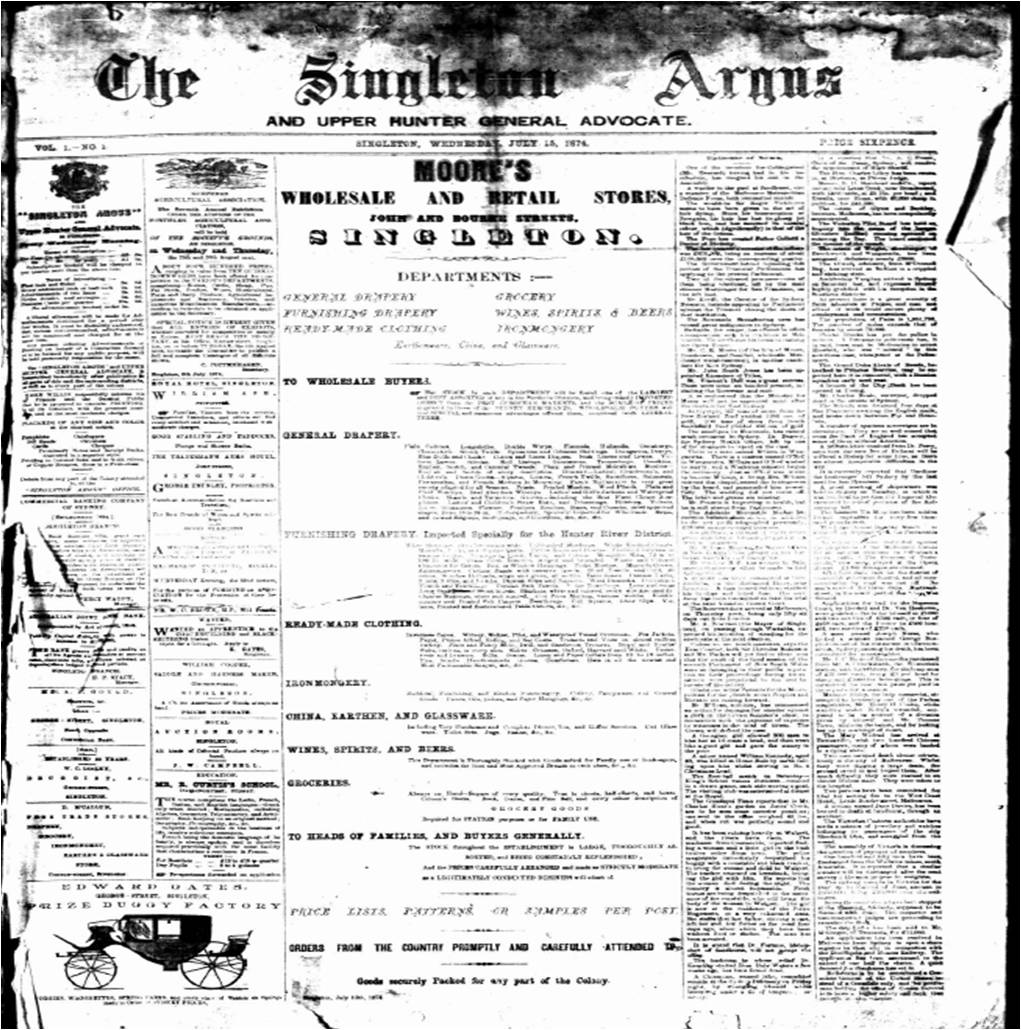
Singleton Argus and Upper Hunter General Advocate, 15 July 1874

The Singleton Argus, also published as The Singleton Argus and Upper Hunter General Advocate, is a semiweekly English language newspaper published in Singleton, New South Wales, Australia since 1874.

== History ==
The Singleton Argus and Upper Hunter General Advocate began as a weekly newspaper and was first published on 15 July 1874 by John Willis. In September 1874 it was purchased by Thomas Boyce and Henry Pinchin. The title was shortened to The Singleton Argus on 14 July 1880.

== Digitisation ==
The paper has been digitised as part of the Australian Newspapers Digitisation Program project of the National Library of Australia.

== See also ==
- List of newspapers in Australia
