= Hawkesbury Radio =

- City of Hawkesbury, New South Wales; Australia

Programming
- Format: Mixed

Ownership
- Owner: Hawkesbury Radio Communications Cooperative Society Limited

History
- First air date: 1978
- Former call signs: 2VTR
- Former names: Hawkesbury Radio 89.9
- Former frequencies: 89.9 MHz

Links
- Website: Official website

Hawkesbury Radio is a radio station which broadcasts via the Internet and is situated in the City of Hawkesbury in New South Wales, Australia.

The station is staffed by volunteers. Hawkesbury Radio was the only community radio station in Australia to have broadcast rights of NRL which featured Penrith Panthers NRL matches, from 1997 to 2009. In 2016 the station gained broadcast rights to Western Sydney Wanderers A-League matches as well as W-League, National Youth League and FFA Cup matches involving the Wanderers

Hawkesbury Radio began in 1978 with a test broadcast, gaining its full licence in 1982, one of the first local community radio licences granted. The station broadcast out of a tiny condemned building, which housed the studio and transmitter on Fitzgerald Street, Windsor for many years, before moving to its current site in 1992 in an adjacent building. Hawkesbury Radio originally broadcast on 89.7 MHz, but moved to the frequency of 89.9 MHz in December 1999. In November 2022, the Australian Communications and Media Authority (ACMA) denied Hawkesbury Radio the licence, and the station switched over to Internet-only broadcasting.

== History ==
=== Loss of licence ===
In August 2017, the ACMA decided not to renew Hawkesbury Radio's full-time community broadcaster licence following many years of non-compliance with licence conditions including maintaining and ensuring community participation.

=== Potential eviction ===
In November 2026, Hawkesbury Radio was served with a notice to evacuate their premises next to a water tower in Windsor within three months as landlord Sydney Water claims that the building is not up to code.

== Programming ==
Hawkesbury Radio uses an album-oriented rock mix during daytime hours. Outside of these hours, there are specialist programs such as bluegrass, country and western music. The station also has sports programs on Fridays, Saturdays and Sundays.

== Sports coverage ==
For 20 years it has broadcast various live events from calling Penrith Panthers NRL Matches from 1997-2009 and the club's reserve grade matches, to covering Windsor Wolves Ron Massey Cup Matches. Plus finals matches in NSWRL Competitions.

From 2016, the station has become the community radio partner of the Western Sydney Wanderers, with all A-League games covered on radio and all home games of the W-League and Youth League games online. The station also broadcasts the National Premier Leagues NSW competition each week in divisions 1, 2 and 3.

In addition the station became the first in Australia to broadcast a World Rugby Sevens Series event in broadcasting all three days of the 2017 Sydney Sevens, and the station also broadcasts at least one game a week in the Shute Shield Sydney club rugby competition after broadcasting Penrith Emus games from 2001-2003.
