= 96.5 Wave FM =

96.5 Wave FM (2UUL)
- Wollongong, New South Wales; Australia
- Frequency: 96.5 MHz
- Branding: Illawarra's Best Music

Programming
- Language: English
- Format: Hot adult contemporary

Ownership
- Owner: ARN; (Wollongong Broadcasters Pty Ltd)
- Sister stations: Hot Tomato

History
- First air date: 18 July 1931
- Former call signs: 2WL
- Former frequencies: 1435 kHz (1931–1935); 1430 kHz (1935–1978); 1314 kHz (1978–1992)
- Call sign meaning: Three-letter variation on former 2WL call sign

Technical information
- Licensing authority: ACMA
- ERP: 40 kW

Links
- Public licence information: Profile
- Website: wavefm.com.au

96.5 Wave FM (call sign 2UUL) is a commercial radio station broadcasting on the FM band to the Illawarra region of New South Wales, Australia. It is owned by ARN after ARN's purchase of the Grant Broadcasters radio network. 96.5 Wave FM competes with rival i98 at the top of the Illawarra's ratings for radio listenership.

== History ==
The station was born as 2WL and commenced broadcasting on 18 July 1931. The station was owned by Wollongong Broadcasting Pty Ltd. The station studio and offices were in Edward Street, Wollongong and were linked to a broadcasting antenna at Unanderra. The station was officially opened by J. P. Caddy, president of the Illawarra Chamber of Commerce and Industry.

In November 1980, 2WL went off air briefly after a tornado brought down one of their two Windang transmitter towers. After 61 years of AM broadcasting, the station moved to the FM band in July 1992.

In July 2021, it was announced that prominent i98 announcers Lyndal Rogers and Ryan Cram would be moving to the competition, joining Wave FM to host a new drive show. Their show replaced the nationally syndicated Nova program Kate, Tim & Joel.

In November 2021, ARN announced the acquisition of Grant Broadcasters which included Wave FM.

In September 2021, former Australian Idol winner Damien Leith joined the breakfast show as an announcer after a successful stint doing breakfast radio at sister station Power FM 98.1 in Muswellbrook.

== Presenters ==
- Damien Leith, Breakfast
- Jade Tonta, Breakfast
- Dean Kesby, Mornings
- Matthew Brokenbrough, Workday
- Lyndal Rogers, Drive
- Ryan Cram, Drive
