= Mount Helen FM 101.7/107.3 =

Mount Helen FM
Murrurundi Muswellbrook; Australia
- Broadcast area: Hunter Valley; Liverpool Plains
- Frequencies: 107.3 MHz Murrurundi; 101.7 MHz Muswellbrook

Programming
- Format: Community, Country music

Ownership
- Owner: Mt Helen FM and TV Upper Hunter and Liverpool Plains Community Broadcasting Telecasting & Tourism Association Inc.

History
- First air date: 1994–99 (weekends only); 1999–August 2006 (fulltime)

Mount Helen FM (callsign: 2GGZ) was a community radio station, serving the Hunter Valley and Liverpool Plains areas of New South Wales. It operated studios in Willow Tree (near Murrurundi) and Muswellbrook, and operated from transmitters serving both areas.

The station originally began broadcasting on a limited basis, usually only on weekends, in 1994. In 1999, the station was granted a full-time community licence. The station's format at its launch until its demise was country music.

When the station applied for its licence renewal in 2004, the Australian Broadcasting Authority found that the station had not been meeting required standards of community access. On 19 September 2005, the successor to the ABA, the Australian Communications & Media Authority, announced that additional conditions were to be placed on Mount Helen FM's licence, relating to community involvement and access to air time, and the station's corporate governance.

Over the next year, dates set by ACMA for the station to comply with the new conditions were not met. As a result, the authority issued a formal notice on 31 August 2006 to comply with their additional conditions by 1 October 2006. Instead of complying, the station went off the air in August 2006. ACMA cancelled the licence on 15 December 2006.

The two frequencies used by Mount Helen FM are still allocated for community use under the Muswellbrook radio licence area plan, and until recently, there were no stations broadcasting on those frequencies. However, since September 2009, 101.7 MHz is being used under an unknown licensee as a full-time rebroadcaster of SBS Radio, despite broadcasting from the same site as a proposed rebroadcaster of the same network on 107.7FM, licensed to the Upper Hunter Shire Council. Country music can now be heard on the low-powered Hot Country Radio narrowcast station in Muswellbrook.
