= ABC New England North West =

ABC Local Radio station

Australia
- Broadcast area: New England, Australia
- Frequencies: 648 kHz AM New England; 819 kHz AM Northern Tablelands; 99.1 MHz FM North West Slopes; 101.9 MHz FM Armidale

Programming
- Format: Talk

Ownership
- Owner: Australian Broadcasting Corporation

History
- First air date: 9 November 1948

Technical information
- Transmitter coordinates: 31°05′38.11″S 150°56′01.29″E

Links
- Website: https://www.abc.net.au/newengland/

ABC New England North West is an ABC Local Radio station based in Tamworth and broadcasting to the regions of New England, the Northern Tablelands and North West Slopes in New South Wales. This includes the towns and cities of Armidale, Moree, Tenterfield and Glen Innes.

== History ==
The station began as 2NU in 1948 and is now heard on these main AM and FM frequencies along with a number of low-power FM repeaters:

- 2NU 648 AM
- 2GL 819 AM
- 2NWR 99.1 and 101.9 FM

The first broadcast was held in the then-small town hall, and studios were built a year later, with music programs only broadcast at 8:45 to 9:00 am. The next year, local sporting programs and news bulletins were introduced. In 1953, the breakfast program was introduced, and three years later, the Local Women's Session program began.

== See also ==
- List of radio stations in Australia
