= Power FM 98.1 =

Radio station in Muswellbrook, New South Wales, Australia

2VLY (Power FM)

Muswellbrook, New South Wales, Australia; Australia
- Broadcast area: Hunter Valley
- Frequency: 98.1 MHz FM
- Branding: 98.1 Power FM

Programming
- Format: Adult contemporary

Ownership
- Owner: ARN; (Radio Hunter Valley Pty Ltd)
- Sister stations: 2NM

History
- First air date: 7 June 1995
- Call sign meaning: Hunter VaLleY

Technical information
- Power: 20 kW (licensed); 10kw (actual)
- Transmitter coordinates: 32.262720°S 150.888685°E
- Repeater: 102.7 MHz FM Merriwa

Links
- Webcast: Online Stream in ASX format
- Website: www.powerfm.com.au/hunter

Power FM 98.1 (call sign: 2VLY) is a local radio station in the Hunter Valley of New South Wales, Australia. It is based in Muswellbrook, and serves listeners in Muswellbrook, Singleton, Scone, Aberdeen, Merriwa, Murrurundi and surrounding areas.

It is owned and operated by ARN, and is licensed to subsidiary Radio Hunter Valley, along with sister stations 2NM and 94.5 Hot Country. Along with 2NM, it operates from studios at 100 Bridge Street, Muswellbrook. Power FM commenced operations on 7 June 1995, as Radio Hunter Valley's supplementary licence, following a series of test simulcasts of 2NM.

The station transmits on 98.1 MHz on the FM band, from a transmitter site atop Mount Arthur, near the town of Muswellbrook. The station is licensed to operate at 20 kilowatts, but is reportedly restricted to 10 kilowatts to prevent its signal from spilling into the nearby Newcastle and Tamworth markets. The station also operates a translator on 102.7 MHz in Merriwa, broadcasting from the Bandera Downs transmission site with a power output of 50 watts. This frequency was launched in 2004 with the support of the federal government's radio blackspots program.

Currently, the station airs an adult contemporary format, featuring music from the 1980s through to today's top 40 hits, aimed at an audience aged under 35.

In 2009, it began streaming its programs online, along with 2NM.

In November 2021, Power FM, along with other stations owned by Grant Broadcasters, were acquired by the ARN. This deal will allow Grant's stations, including Power FM, to access ARN's iHeartRadio platform in regional areas. The deal was finalized on 4 January 2022. It is expected Power FM 98.1 will integrate with ARN's KIIS Network, but will retain its current name according to the press release from ARN.
