= SWR 99.9 FM =

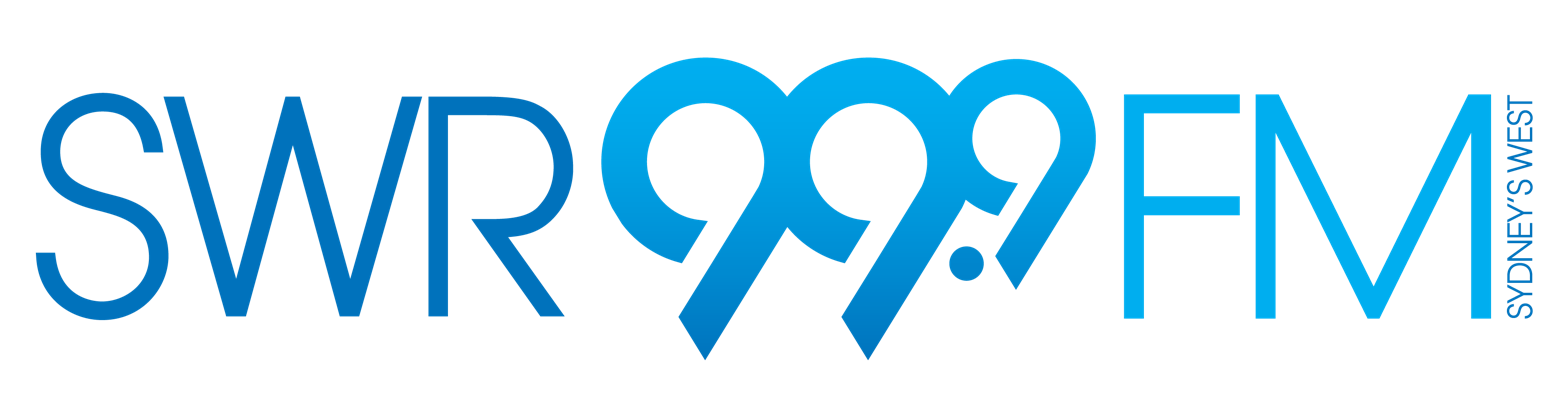
- Australia
- Broadcast area: Greater Western Sydney
- Frequency: 99.9 MHz

Programming
- Format: Adult hits, Community Radio

Ownership
- Owner: SWRFM Community Media Association Inc.

History
- First air date: 27 September 2003
- Call sign meaning: 2 = New South Wales; Sydney; West; Radio

Technical information
- Power: 200 Watts
- HAAT: 175m

Links
- Website: Official website

SWR 99.9 FM (ACMA callsign: 2SWR) is a community radio station based in Blacktown in Sydney. The station broadcasts to parts of Greater Western Sydney, but can be received in most of the Sydney metropolitan area.

The mission of SWR 99.9 FM is to offer the community a voice and an opportunity for anyone to access the airwaves regardless of age, gender, nationality or experience. SWR 99.9 FM is a mostly volunteer run organisation and is funded through listener support, grants and sponsorship.

== History ==
What is now SWR 99.9 FM grew out of a group of people who had initially started in the 1980s as aspirant broadcaster WOW FM. Eventually forming as SWR FM, in 1992 the station started conducting regular test transmissions on 88.3 FM and later on 100.3 FM. These were fully operational and programmed broadcasts, but were usually limited to one or two weeks at a time. In 1994 the then Australian Broadcasting Authority agreed that SWR FM could use its 90 days per year of temporary transmission time by broadcasting every weekend, rather than using up all the time in one or two blocks. This enabled the station to have a continuous presence within the community.

In 1999 the station was able to broadcast full-time under new Temporary Community Broadcasting Licences. However it spent much of 2001 and 2002 off the air due to problems encountered in sharing the frequency with another temporary broadcaster. In 2003 a licence was issued to SWR 99.9 FM and they commenced full-time broadcasting on Saturday 27 September 2003.

== Current ==
SWR 99.9 FM is now home to The Morning Mix with Fyfie (6am-9am) and Drive with Linden (4pm-6pm). The shows both provide local news, weather and traffic and play adult contemporary hits. SWR 99.9 FM now has consistent 70's to Now music formatting with Nine's Radio News bulletins every hour from 6am-6pm every weekday, so listeners can tune into regular programming as they drive to work, while they're at work and on their way home.

Volunteers also produce their own local shows on the station, where you'll find a diverse range of programming and music genres.

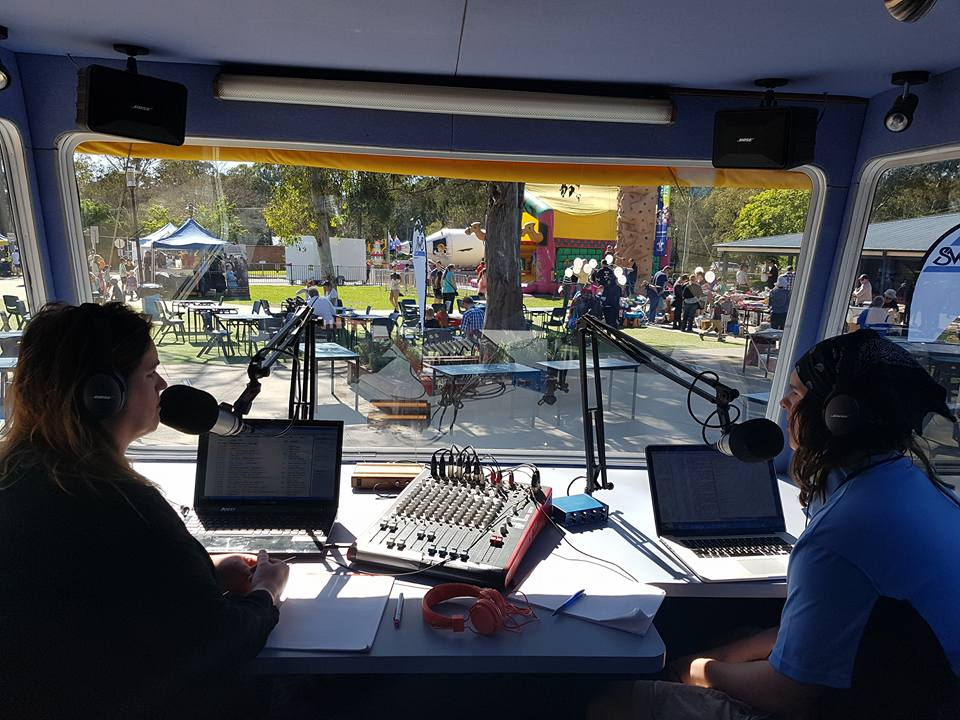
A view from the inside of the SWR 99.9 FM OB Van in action at a local community event

Using its own outside broadcast unit, SWR 99.9 FM regularly broadcasts from local shows and festivals including the Blacktown and Holroyd festivals, Rooty Hill Australia Day celebrations and other local events. The station has a long history of giving air time to local bands. The Musos Show on Saturdays from 2pm-4pm features local and musicians and bands. SWRtember was initially launched to promote local upcoming talent. In 2011 New Zealand rock band Dragon headlined SWRtember and played a 45-minute set live to air. SWRtember has since been replaced with SWR 99.9 FM's Annual Live Radio Gig (see below), usually occurring in September every year.

== Programming ==
The station's overall format is adult hits, branded "The 70's to Now" but also covers a wide range of music styles through local access shows. SWR 99.9 FM also broadcasts programs that are presented by special interest groups or in languages other than English.

== Live Radio Gig ==
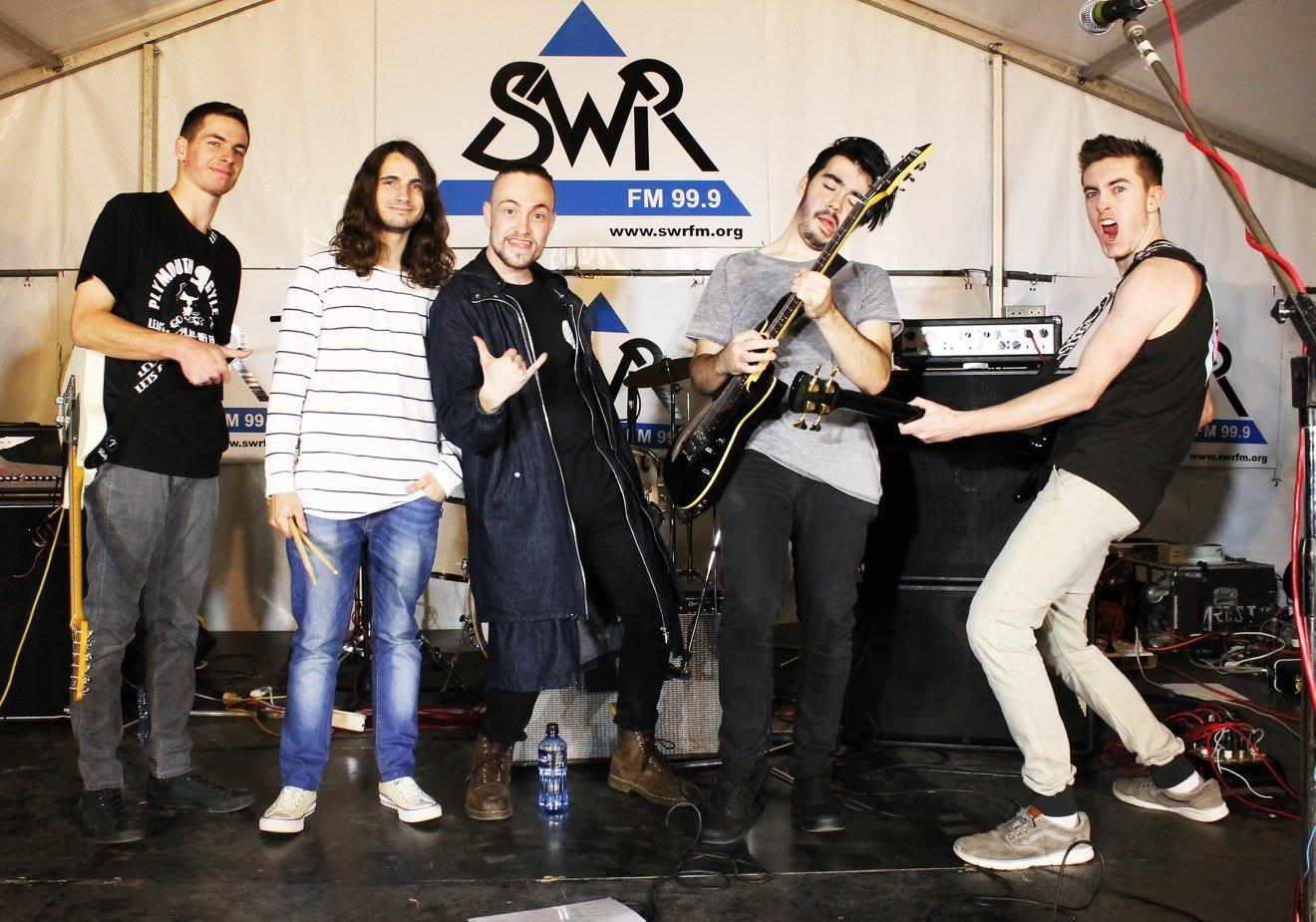
Vacant Shade Performing at the 2016 Live Radio Gig

SWR 99.9 FM hosts a 'Live Radio Gig' Annually to promote local acts and bands. Every year, the radio station invites local bands to perform live on air, hosted at local music venues in recent years. Hence the name, Live Radio Gig. In 2016, the broadcaster also live-streamed the whole event to Facebook to further reach an ever-expanding online audience.

The annual Live Radio Gig has been a success over the years, and there is no sign of this coordinated community event halting in the near future.

Bands that perform at a Live Radio Gig also receive multitrack recordings and mastered recordings of heir set. This is a great initiative, as it gives local bands and artists access to professional recordings who otherwise may not be able to afford such services.

Any local bands that may be interested in performing at a Live Radio Gig, should contact the radio station via their website.

== SWR Rebrand ==
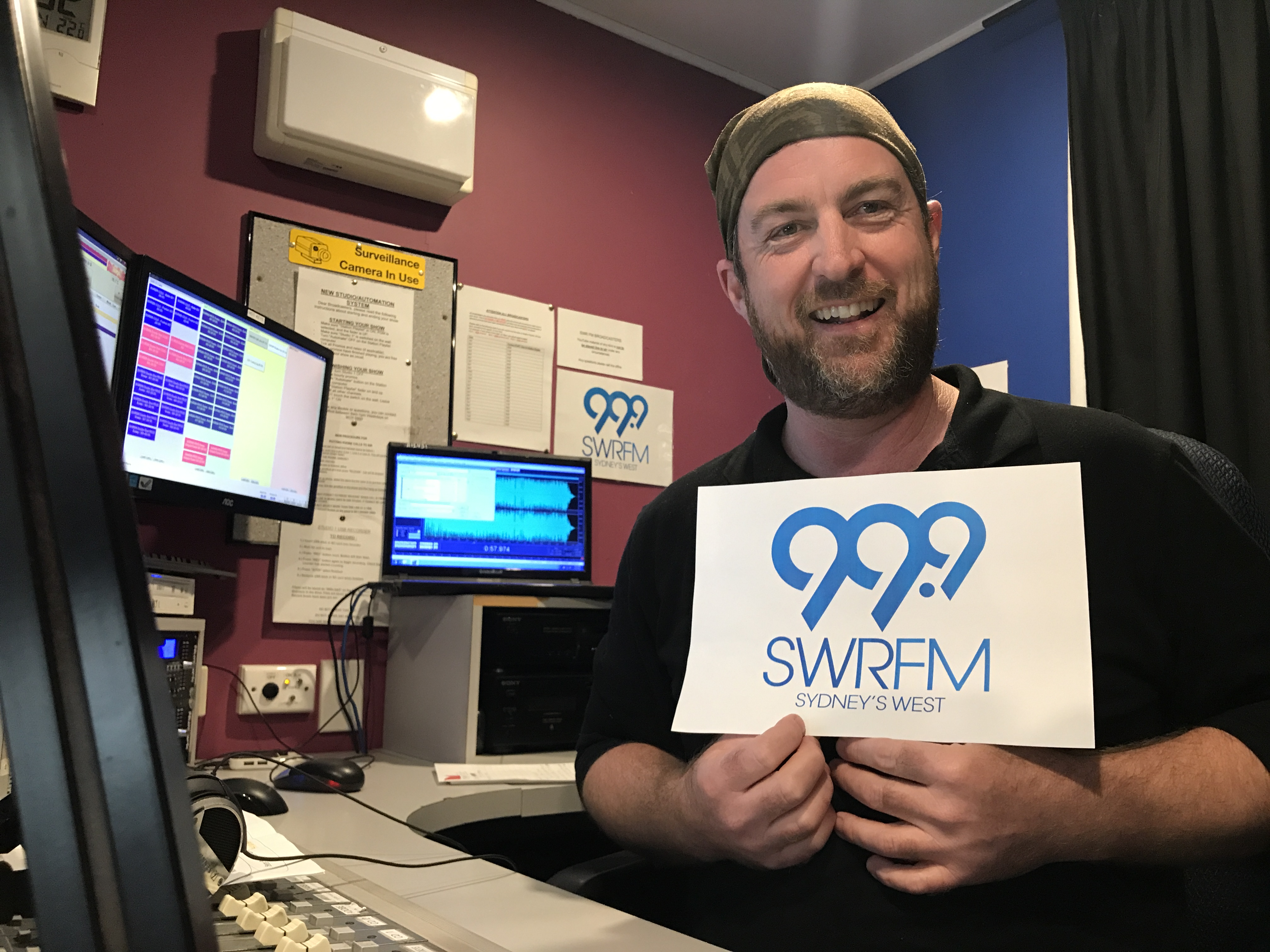
SWR 99.9 FM's breakfast announcer, Busco, holding the new logo

On 1 May 2017, SWR FM rebranded as "SWR Triple 9". The station has since shifted its on-air name to SWR 99.9 FM.

Since the early days of the stations test broadcasts in 1991, the name, sound and feel has only slightly changed along the way. But 1 May marked the start of a new adventure with the stations new look, sound and logo.

"SWR will still have your favourite tunes from the 70's to Now, we've just got a bit of a facelift!"

== See also ==
- List of radio stations in Australia
