= LJ Hooker League =

Cricket competition

The LJ Hooker League is a cricket competition on the NSW Far North Coast comprising teams from the Ballina, Casino, Lismore and Tweed District Cricket Associations.

The League was established in 1994/95 and superseded the top-grade of the Ballina, Casino and Lismore District Competitions.

After 13 seasons, in 2007 the Tweed District Cricket Association asked to join the league to form a larger 16-team competition. The Ballina clubs voted unanimously to join with the Tweed based clubs, but this was rejected by some Lismore-based teams. The league now comprises teams from Ballina, Casino, Lismore and Tweed districts since 2007/08.

Through the Far North Coast Cricket Council (region) and North Coastal Zone (zone), the LJ Hooker League feeds into Country Cricket New South Wales.

== Premiers ==
- 1994/95: Northern Districts
- 1995/96: Ballina Bears
- 1996/97: Marist Brothers
- 1997/98: Southern Districts
- 1998/99: Casino Cavaliers
- 1999/00: Casino Cavaliers
- 2000/01: Tintenbar-East Ballina
- 2001/02: Alstonville
- 2002/03: Tintenbar-East Ballina
- 2003/04: Southern Districts
- 2004/05: Southern Districts
- 2005/06: Tintenbar-East Ballina
- 2006/07: Southern Districts
- 2007/08: Casino Cavaliers
- 2008/09: Ballina Bears
- 2009/10: Casino Cavaliers
- 2010/11: Casino Cavaliers
- 2011/12: Ballina Bears and Casino Cavaliers (joint premiers as final washed-out)
- 2012/13: Cudgen
- 2013/14: Ballina Bears
- 2014/15: Cudgen
- 2015/16: Cudgen
- 2016/17: Alstonville
- 2017/18: Cudgen
- 2018/19: Cudgen
- 2019/20: Cudgen
- 2020/21: Cudgen
- 2021/22: Cudgen
- 2022/23: Goonellabah Workers
- 2023/24: Marist Brothers

== Player of the Year ==
The following players have been named as Player of the Year:

- 1994/95: Stuart Fielder (Marist Brothers)
- 1995/96: Bruce Jobson (Eastern Districts)
- 1996/97: Chris Matthews (Marist Brothers) and Shane Jacobs (Ballina Bears)
- 1997/98: Robert Parks (Brunswick-Byron), Stephen Ryan (Brunswick Byron) and Brett Crawford (Tintenbar-East Ballina)
- 1998/99: Steve Lockhart (Casino Cavaliers)
- 1999/00: Neil Hancock (Casino Cavaliers), Michael Holt(Northern Districts), Al Nowlan (Casino Cavaliers) and Scott Thompson (Brunswick Byron)
- 2000/01: Mark Bratti (Casino Cavaliers)
- 2001/02: Al Nowlan (Eastern Districts)
- 2002/03: Phil Alley (Tintenbar-East Ballina), Michael Nind (Southern Districts)
- 2003/04: Brett Crawford (Tintenbar-East Ballina)
- 2004/05: Bruce Jobson (Eastern Districts), Paul McLean (Southern Districts)
- 2005/06: Brett Crawford (Tintenbar-East Ballina)
- 2006/07: Paul McLean (Southern Districts)
- 2007/08: Brett Crawford (Tintenbar-East Ballina)
- 2008/09: Jason Caught (Lismore Workers)
- 2009/10: Jack Boote (South Tweed)
- 2010/11: Sam Adams (Ballina Bears)
- 2011/12: Sam Adams (Ballina Bears)
- 2012/13: Sam Adams (Ballina Bears)
- 2013/14: Greg Potter Alstonville
- 2014/15: Caleb Ziebell (Cudgen)
- 2015/16: Abe Crawford (Tintenbar-East Ballina)
- 2016/17: Caleb Ziebell (Cudgen)
- 2017/18: Caleb Ziebell (Cudgen)
- 2018/19: Caleb Ziebell (Cudgen) and Will Chapples (Murwillumbah)
- 2019/20: Jason Caught (Lismore Workers)
- 2023/24: Kaleb Auld (Marist Brothers)
