= Country Cricket New South Wales =

Australian regional sports body

- Sport: Cricket
- Jurisdiction: Regional New South Wales
- Membership: Cricket NSW
- Abbreviation: CCNSW
- Founded: 1859; 167 years ago
- Affiliation: Cricket Australia
- Headquarters: Sydney Cricket Ground

Official website
- www.ccnsw.nsw.cricket.com.au
- (New South Wales)
- (Australia)

Country Cricket New South Wales is responsible for the development of cricket in regional New South Wales. It is under control of the governing body Cricket NSW.

== Overview ==
Country Cricket New South Wales is an administrative organisation responsible for the promotion, development and organisation of cricket in regional New South Wales (i.e. all areas outside of the Sydney metropolitan area). It is divided into multiple zones. These are:

- Cricket ACT
- Barrier District Cricket League (Cricket in Broken Hill)
- Central Coast CA
- Central Northern Zone
- Illawarra CA
- Newcastle Cricket Zone
- North Coastal Zone
- Riverina Zone
- Southern Zone
- Western Zone

== History ==
In country New South Wales, one of the earliest clubs was the Queanbeyan District Cricket Club, being officially formed in 1863 but having played games as a less formally structured club against teams from local towns through the 1850s.

Cricket was first played in the region now known as the Central Coast in 1858. With the Ourimbah (Blue Gum Flat) cricket club prevalent, and clubs at Gosford, Kincumber and Wyong joining in, social matches were played throughout the remainder of the 19th Century. Competitions were conducted and concluded in 1899-1900 and 1906-07. In 1911-12, the Narara Cricket Club entered the Newcastle District Cricket Association Senior Grade competition. Strengthened by a few players from other local clubs, the side won the competition, Arthur Brown from Jilliby scoring 243 not out in the final against Wickham. The Wyong District Cricket Association began regular and sustained competitions in 1912-13, and was joined by the Gosford DCA in 1920-21. The two ran in parallel for most of the next fifty years. The amalgamated GWDCA became the Central Coast Cricket Association early in the new millennium.

These days, there are 48 cricket leagues across country New South Wales. Unlike the state's most popular winter sport, rugby league, most cricket leagues are based in one or two towns, and feature smaller numbers of clubs, with a more local focus.

== Representative Competitions ==
Country Cricket NSW hosts many representative tournaments for regional NSW. These include:

- Bradman Cup (U-16's)
- Country Championship
- Country Cup
- Country Colts
- Kookaburra Cup (U-14s)
- SCG Country Cup
- Under 17's

== Major Competitions ==
=== Cricket ACT ===
Grade Clubs include:

- Australian National University Cricket Club
- Eastlake Cricket Club
- Ginninderra Cricket Club
- North Canberra Gungahlin Cricket Club
- Queanbeyan District Cricket Club
- Tuggeranong Valley Cricket Club
- Weston Creek Cricket Club
- Western District and University of Canberra Cricket Club

Source: Cricket ACT Clubs

=== Central Coast Cricket Association ===
Website: Central Coast CA

Club				First Grade Premierships & Spans			Lower Grade Premierships	
Currently	Est.	Previously	Earliest Known Match	pre 1971	post 1970	Seasons in First Grade	pre 1971	post 1970
Brisbane Water	2013	merger of…		-	0	2016-17	-	1
Brisbane Water	2013	Gosford	1874	8	3	1899–1900, 1906–07, 1919–20 to 1940-41, 1944–45 to 2007-08, 2008–09 as Gosford-Mountains, 2009–10 and 2010-11	7	15
Brisbane Water	2013	Mountains-Kariong	1960		2	1960–61 to 1969-70, 1970–71 to 1981–82 as Matcham-Mountains, 1982–83 to 2007-08, 2008–09 as Gosford-Mountains, 2009–10 to 2012-13	0	9
Kincumber-Avoca	1860s	Kincumber	1872	8	7	1899–1900, 1906–07, 1920–21 to 1933-34, 1937–38 to 1940-41, 1949–50 to 1954-55, Kincumber-Avoca 1960–61 to now.	0	35
Kincumber-Avoca	1860s	absorbed Avoca	1955	0	-	1956–57 to 1959-60	0	-
Lisarow-Ourimbah	1944	merger of…		3	4	1944–45 to now	5	28
Lisarow-Ourimbah	1944	Lisarow	1921	13	-	1921–22 to 1939-40, 1940–41 as Narara-Lisarow	6	-
Lisarow-Ourimbah	1944	Ourimbah	1862	3	-	1899–1900, 1906–07, 1912–13 to 1915-16, 1918–19 to 1939-40	3	-
Narara-Wyoming	1898	Narara	1898	6	12	1899–1900, 1906–07, 1911–12 and 1912–13 in Newcastle, 1913–14 and 1915–16 as Lisarow, 1918–19 to 1939-40, 1940–41 as Narara-Lisarow, 1949–50 to 1955-56, 1960–61 to 1965-66, Narara-Wyoming 1966–67 to now.	7	40
Narara-Wyoming	1898	absorbed Wyoming	1926	0	-	1926–27 to 1929-30	0	-
Northern Power	2013	merger of…		-	0	2013–14 to now	-	6
Northern Power	2013	Toukley	1950s	3	4	1956-57, 1957–58, 1961–62 to 1970-71, 1974–75 to 2012-13	2	28
Northern Power	2013	Doyalson-Wyee	1975	-	0	1976–77 to 1979-80, 1981–82 to 2010-11, 2012-13	-	5
Southern Spirit	2014	merger of…		-	0	2014–15 to now	-	3
Southern Spirit	2014	Woy Woy	1915	1	0	1915-16,1920–21, 1928–29 to 1935-36, 1937–38, 1946–47, 1959–60, 1960–61 to 2012-13	6	9
Southern Spirit	2014	Umina	1967	-	9	1970-71, 1972–73 to 2011-12, 2013-14	0	9
Terrigal-Matcham	1947	Matcham-Holgate	1947	2	2	1949–50 to 1956-57, 1961–62 to 1968-69, 1970–71 to 1981–82 as Matcham-Mountains, 1982–83 to 2002–03 as Matcham-Holgate, Terrigal-Matcham 2003–04 to now	7	22
The Entrance	1913		1913	7	3	1913-14, 1914–15, 1924–25, 1932–33 to 1937-38, 1947–48 to now	1	22
Warnervale	2007		2007	-	0	2010-11, 2016-17	-	9
Wyong District	1968	merger of…		-	2	1968–69 to now	-	18
Wyong District	1968	Wyong	1871	12	-	1899–1900, 1906–07, 1912–13 to 1915-16, 1918–19 to 1938-39, 1944–45 to 1967-68	1	-
Wyong District	1968	Tuggerah	1898	9	-	1912-13, 1920–21, 1921–22, 1923–24, 1926–27, 1930–31 to 1934-35, 1936–37, 1937–38, 1947–48 to 1967-68	3	-

Source: Central Coast CA Clubs

See the List of NSW Central Coast Cricket First Grade Premiers

=== Illawarra Cricket Association ===
Website: Cricket Illawarra

Grade Clubs in include:

- Balgownie
- Corrimal
- Dapto
- Helensburgh
- Illawarra Passionate Cricketers Club
- Keira
- Northern Districts
- Port Kembla
- University of Wollongong
- Wests Illawarra
- Wollongong District

=== Newcastle Cricket Zone ===
This zone comprises the Newcastle District Cricket Association and the Newcastle City and Suburban Cricket Association

==== District Competition ====
- Belmont
- Cardiff-Boolaroo
- Charlestown
- HamWicks
- MDCC
- Newcastle City
- Stockton & Northern Districts
- Toronto Workers
- University
- Wallsend
- Waratah-Mayfield
- Wests

=== Barrier D.C.L. ===
Grade Clubs include:

- Central Broken Hill
- North Broken Hill
- Souths
- Warriors
- Wests

Source: Barrier DCL Clubs

== Central Northern Zone ==
This zone comprises both the Hunter Valley Cricket Council and the Northern Inland Cricket Council

=== Cessnock DCA ===
- Bellbird
- Creeks
- Denman
- Glendon
- Greta-Branxton
- Hotel Cessnock
- JPC
- Piranhas
- PCH
- Valleys
- Wine Country

=== Maitland DCA ===
- City United
- Eastern Suburbs
- Kurri & Weston
- Northern Suburbs
- Raymond Terrace
- Tenambit-Morpeth
- Thornton Thunder
- Western Suburbs

=== Narrabri DCA ===
- Boggabri Colts
- Narrabri Colts
- RSL
- Tatts
- Tourist
- Wilga Razorbacks

=== Upper Hunter DCA ===
- Belltrees
- Brook
- Bunnan
- Bushrangers
- Merriwa
- Murrurundi
- Rouchel

== North Coastal Zone ==
This zone encompasses the Far NSW North Coast, North Coast and Mid North Coast and comprises multiple councils and districts. These include:

=== Far North Coast Cricket Council ===
- Alstonville Cricket Club
- Ballina Bears Cricket Club
- Casino RSM Cavaliers
- Cudgen Hornets
- Goonellabah Workers Sports Cricket Club
- Marist Brothers
- Murwillumbah Cricket Club
- Pottsville Cricket Club
- Tintenbar-East Ballina Cricket Club

=== North Coast Cricket Council ===
==== Clarence River CA ====
- Aussie Hotel
- Brothers
- GDSC Easts
- Harwood Cricket Club
- Lawrence Cricket Club
- South/Westlawn Cricket Club
- Tucabia Copmanhurst Ulmarra Hotel Cricket Club

==== Coffs Harbour District CA ====
- Bellingen-Dorrigo Cricket Club
- Coffs Colts
- Diggers Cricket Club
- Nana Glen Cricket Club
- NDRCC
- Sawtell Cricket Club
- Valleys Cricket Club

==== Lower Clarence CA ====
- Harwood Cricket Club
- Iluka Cricket Club
- Maclean Cricket Club
- Woodford Island Warriors
- Yamba Cricket Club

==== Nambucca Valley CA ====
- Macksville Ex-Services
- Macksville Hotel
- Nambucca Pippiemunchers
- Scotts Head Spanish Mackerels
- Taylors Arm Drop Bears

=== Mid North Coast Cricket Council ===
==== Mid North Coast Cricket Council Two Rivers Cup ====
- Beechwood
- Leagues
- Macquarie
- Nulla
- Rovers (Kempsey)
- Wauchope

==== Hastings River District CA ====
- Beechwood
- Bonny Hills-Lake Cathie
- Comboyne-Kendall Cricket Club
- Macquarie Cricket Club
- Port City Leagues
- Settlers Pirates
- Wauchope Cricket Club

==== Macleay Valley CA ====
- Rovers
- Nulla
- Seabreeze

==== Manning River District CA ====
- Bulahdelah
- Gloucester
- Great Lakes
- Old Bar
- Pacific Palms
- Taree United
- Taree West
- Wingham

== Riverina Zone ==
This zone is divided into four councils of multiple districts:

=== Cricket Albury Wodonga Country Cricket Council ===
Cricket Albury Wodonga Provincial

- Albury
- Baranduda
- Belvoir
- Corowa
- East Albury
- Lavington
- New City
- North Albury
- St Patrick's
- Tallangatta
- Wodonga
- Wodonga Raiders

Cricket Albury Wodonga District

- Barnawartha-Chiltern
- Bethanga
- Dederang
- Eskdale
- Howlong
- Kiewa
- Mount Beauty
- Yackandandah

Cricket Albury Wodonga Hume

- Brocklesby-Burrumbuttock
- Culcairn
- Henty
- Holbrook
- Lockhart
- Oaklands
- Osborne
- Rand
- The Rock Yerong Creek
- Walla Walla

=== Murrumbidgee Cricket Council ===
==== Ardlethan Barellan CA ====
- Ardlethan-Beckom Cricket Club
- Barellan Cricket Club
- Coolamon Crickets
- Coolamon Rovers
- Ganmain Cricket Club
- Kamarah Cricket Club
- Narrandera Cricket Club
- Yanco Cricket Club

==== Griffith DCA ====
- Coleambally Nomads
- Coro Cougars
- Griffith Ex-Servicemen's Diggers
- Griffith Exies Eagles
- Hanwood Wanderers
- Griffith Leagues Club Panthers

==== Hay DCA ====
- Hay Titans
- Riverina Hotel
- South Hay Colts
- South Hay Crusaders

==== Lake Cargelligo DCA ====
- Condobolin
- Euabalong
- Hillston
- Lake-Burgooney

==== West Wyalong DCA ====
- Alleena
- Ariah Park
- Bowly Bandits
- Tallimba
- Ungarie

=== Northern Riverina Cricket Council ===
==== South West Slopes Cricket League ====
- Bribbaree Rams
- Boorowa Crocs
- Boorowa Big Bottles
- Cootamundra Ex-Services Bulls
- Criterion Hotel Young
- Grenfell Blues
- Harden Hornets
- Junee Stallions
- Murringo Mavericks
- Temora Bowling Club Tigers
- Temora Ex-Services Renegades
- Temora Shamrock Leprechauns
- Stockinbingal Cricket Club

==== Tumut DCA ====
- Adelong Donkeys
- Coolac Cricket Club
- Gundagai Cricket Club
- Murrumbidgee Mankadders (Tarcutta)
- Tumut Plains
- Wyangle Cricket Club

==== Wagga Wagga DCA ====
- Kooringal Colts
- Lake Albert Bulls
- South Wagga Blues
- St Michaels Cricket Club
- Wagga City Cats
- Wagga RSL Bulldogs

==== Yass DCA ====
- Bookham Bulls
- Gundaroo Goats
- Hall Monitors
- Murrumbateman
- Yass Golf Club Cobras

=== Southern Riverina Cricket Council ===
==== Murray Valley DCA ====
- Barooga
- Berrigan
- Cobram
- Deniliquin Rhinos
- Finley
- Katamatite
- Nathalia
- Tocumwal

== Southern Zone ==
Website: Southern Zone

This zone is divided into six districts. These are:

=== Eurobodalla DCA ===
- Bega
- Bermagui
- Eden
- Kameruka
- Merimbula
- Pambula
- Tathra

=== Goulburn DCA ===
- Bowlo
- Crookwell
- GSKR
- Hibo
- Madbulls
- SJCC

=== Highlands DCA ===
- Bowral
- Bowral Blues
- Bundy
- HNVCC
- Mittagong
- Moss Vale
- Robertson
- Wingello

==== Monaro DCA ====
- Bombala Cricket Club
- Cooma Coffey's
- Dalgety
- Jindabyne Tigers
- Cooma Rhythm
- Berridale Whitetails
- Cooma Titan

=== Shoalhaven DCA ===
- Batemans Bay
- Bay and Basin
- Berry-Shoalhaven Heads
- Bomaderry
- Ex-Servo's
- NNCCC

 Nowra CC

- Shoalhaven
- Sussex Inlet
- Ulladulla

=== South Coast DCA ===
- Albion Park Eagles
- Bay and Basin
- Berry-Shoalhaven Heads
- Bomaderry
- Ex-Servo's
- Gerringong
- Jamberoo
- Kiama Cavaliers
- Kookas
- LICC
- North Nowra
- Oak Flats Rats
- Shellharbour City
- The Rail

== Western Zone ==
Website: Western Zone

This zone is divided into 3 Councils covering multiple districts:

=== Lachlan Cricket Council ===
==== Parkes DCA ====
- Cowra Valleys
- Parkes Cambridge Cats
- Parkes Colts
- Parkes Raptors

=== Macquarie Valley Cricket Council ===
==== Bourke DCA ====
- Boomerangs
- Brewarrina
- Fords Bridge
- Louth
- Two Water Holes CC

==== Cobar DCA ====
- Empire Billy Goats
- Golf Club
- Howie's Hombres
- Nymagee Magpies
- Tilpa Bushies
- Whackers

===== Dubbo DCA =====
- CYMS
- DRCC
- Macquarie
- Newtown
- Narromine
- RSL
- South Dubbo

==== Gilgandra DCA ====
- Baradine
- Biddon-Tooraweenah
- Breelong
- CCC
- Curban
- Gidgee
- Gulargambone
- Town Services
- USC-Marthaguy

==== Wellington DCA ====
- Geurie
- Farmers
- Muckarounders
- Peckers

=== Central West Cricket Council ===
==== Bathurst DCA ====
- Bathurst City
- Blayney
- Bushrangers
- Centennial
- City Colts
- St Patrick's

==== Gulgong DCA ====
- Bowlers Bullets
- Centennial
- Dunedoo Destroyers
- Goolma Polar Bears

==== Lithgow-Blue Mountains DCA ====
- Blackheath
- Hampton
- Hartley
- Kedumba
- La Salle CC
- Leura
- Lithgow Valley

==== Molong DCA ====
- Canowindra
- Cudal
- Euchareena
- Lyndhurst
- Milthorpe
- Molong

==== Mudgee DCA ====
- Kelly's Irish Pub
- Mudgee Concrete
- Oriental Bulls
- Oriental Colts
- Paragon Hotel

===== Orange DCA =====
- Cavaliers
- Centrals
- Orange City
- Orange CYMS

== Country Cricket NSW Staff ==
=== Administration ===
- CEO: TBC
- Country Cricket Coordinator: Bruce Whitehouse

=== Regional Cricket Staff ===
- Central North RCM: Matthew Walter
- Illawarra Southern RCM: Paul Brockley
- Newcastle Central Coast RCM: Francis Walsh
- North Coast RCM: Lawrence Murphy
- Riverina RCM: Robbie Mackinlay
- Western RCM: Matthew Tabbernor

== See also ==
- Cricket in New South Wales
- Cricket NSW
