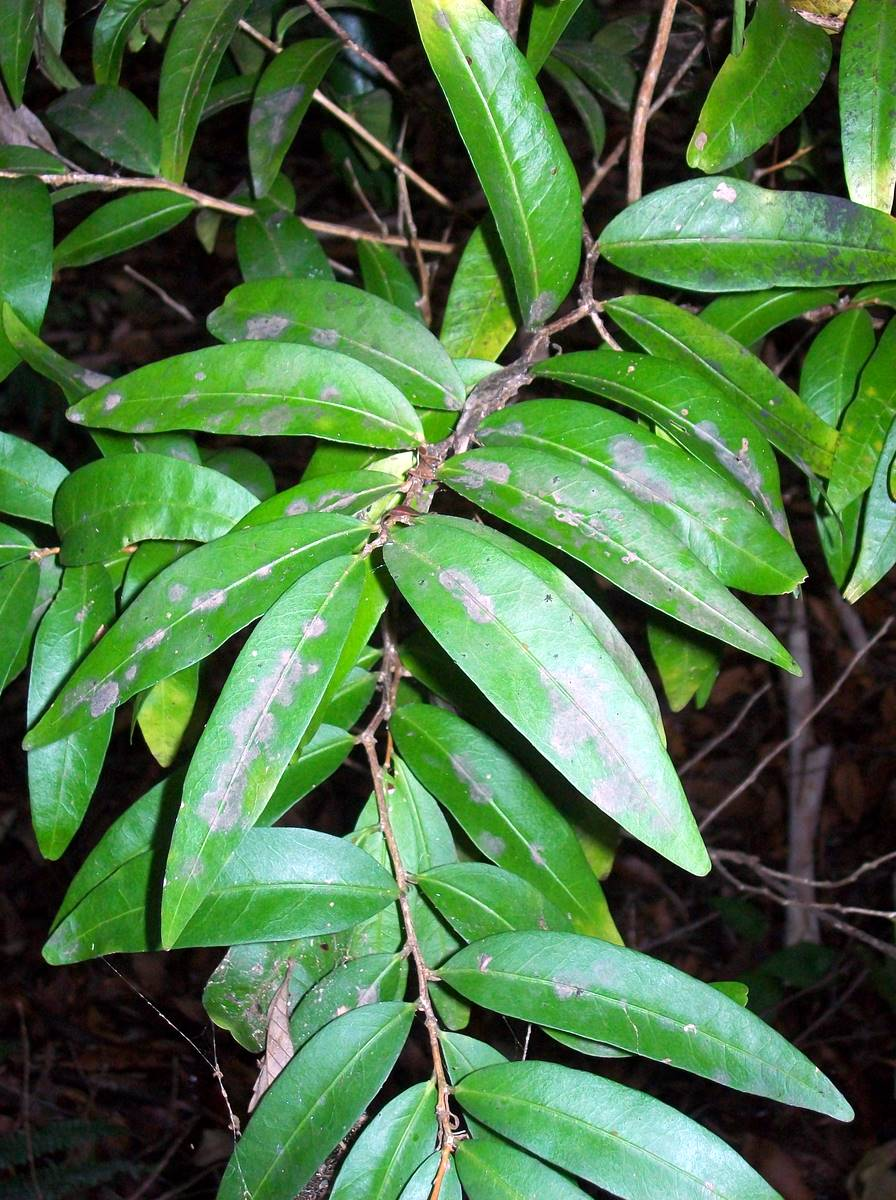

Conservation status
- Least Concern (NCA)

Scientific classification
- Kingdom: Plantae
- Clade: Embryophytes
- Clade: Tracheophytes
- Clade: Angiosperms
- Clade: Eudicots
- Clade: Rosids
- Order: Celastrales
- Family: Celastraceae
- Genus: Hedraianthera; F.Muell.
- Species: H. porphyropetala

Binomial name
- Hedraianthera porphyropetala F.Muell.

= Hedraianthera =

Genus of flowering plants

Hedraianthera is a genus of plants in the family Celastraceae. It is monotypic, meaning that it contains only one species, namely Hedraianthera porphyropetala. It is a tree, first described in 1865, and is endemic to New South Wales and Queensland, Australia.

== Description ==
Hedraianthera porphyropetala is a shrub or small tree growing to about 6 m (20 ft) tall. The leaves are elliptic to ovate and grow up to 17 cm (6.7 in) long and 6 cm (2.4 in) wide. They are dark green above, lighter below, and the margins are without teeth or lobes. They have between five and eight lateral veins on either side of the midvein.

Flowers may be either solitary or are carried on a raceme, and the pedicels (flower stalks) are up to 25 mm (1 in) long. They have five reddish petals and are about 10 mm (0.4 in) diameter. The calyx lobes are about 1 mm (0.04 in) long, the stigma and ovary are five-lobed, as is the capsular fruit.

== Distribution and habitat ==
The natural range of this species is from the far northeast of New South Wales around Ballina, north along the east coast to Cooktown at the base of Cape York Peninsula. It grows beach forest and both sub-tropical and tropical rainiforest. The altitudinal range in north Queensland is sea level to about 1,000 m (3,300 ft). They are an unusually southern example of ramiflory.

== Taxonomy ==
The genus Hedraianthera was erected by German-born Australian botanist Ferdinand von Mueller in 1865 to accommodate this species. A second species was provisionally added to the genus after the collection of material near Mossman, Queensland in 1978 which had a superficial similarity to the this species. The new collection was given the provisional name "Hedraianthera sp. Mossman (V.K.Moriarty 2557)", but later it was determined to be in the genus Brassiantha instead. It was subsequently named Brassiantha hedraiantheroides, after its likeness to Hedraianthera.

=== Etymology ===
The generic name Hedraianthera is from Greek, it refers to the flower anthers without stalks. The specific epithet porphyropetala is also from Greek, it alludes to the attractive deep purple coloured flowers, although the species definition includes plants which have different coloured flowers such as green.

== Gallery ==
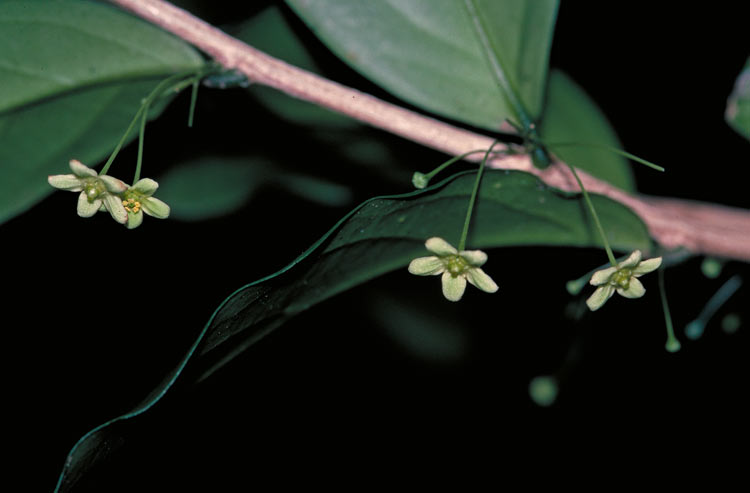
Pale flowers

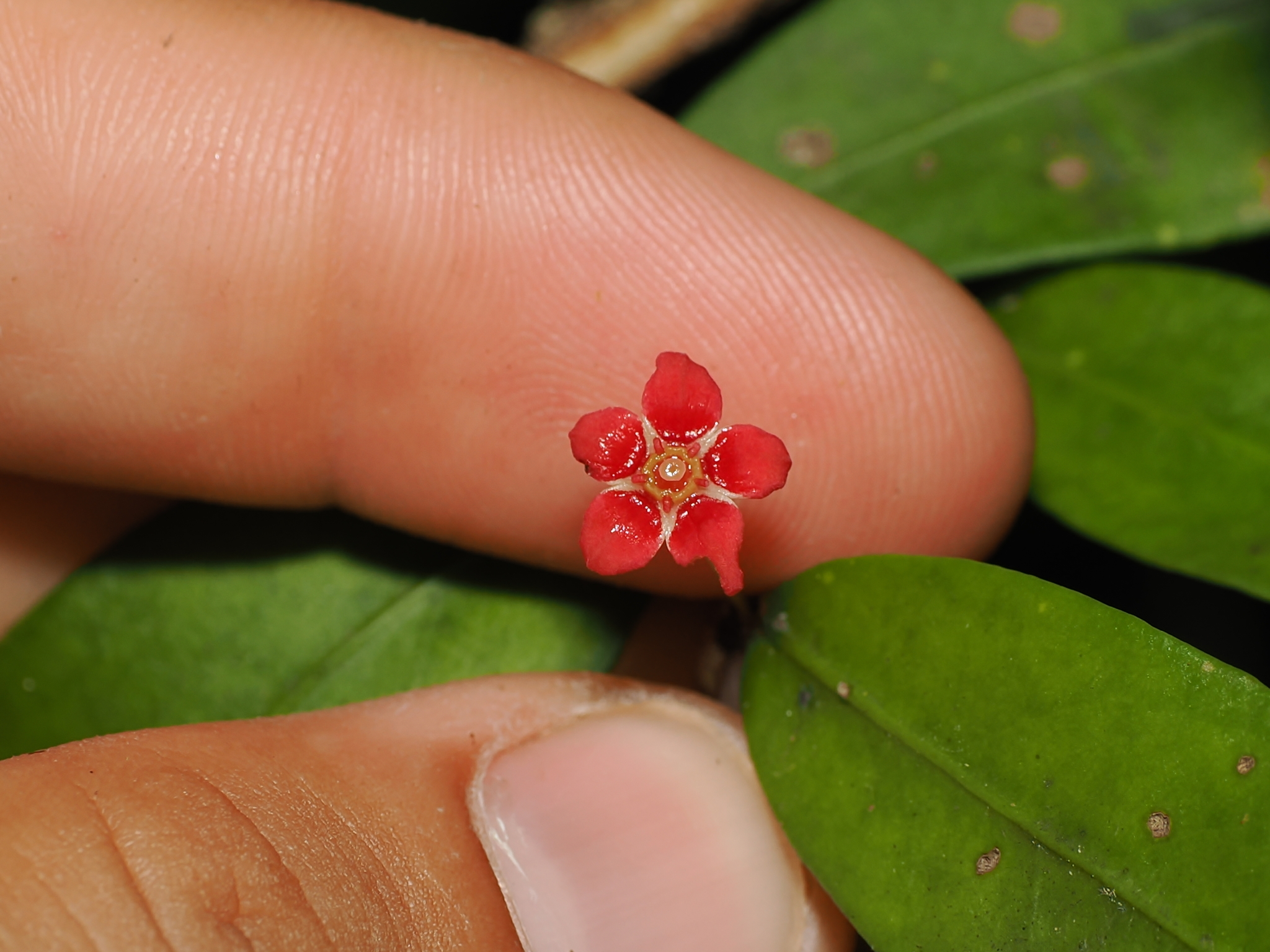
Red flower

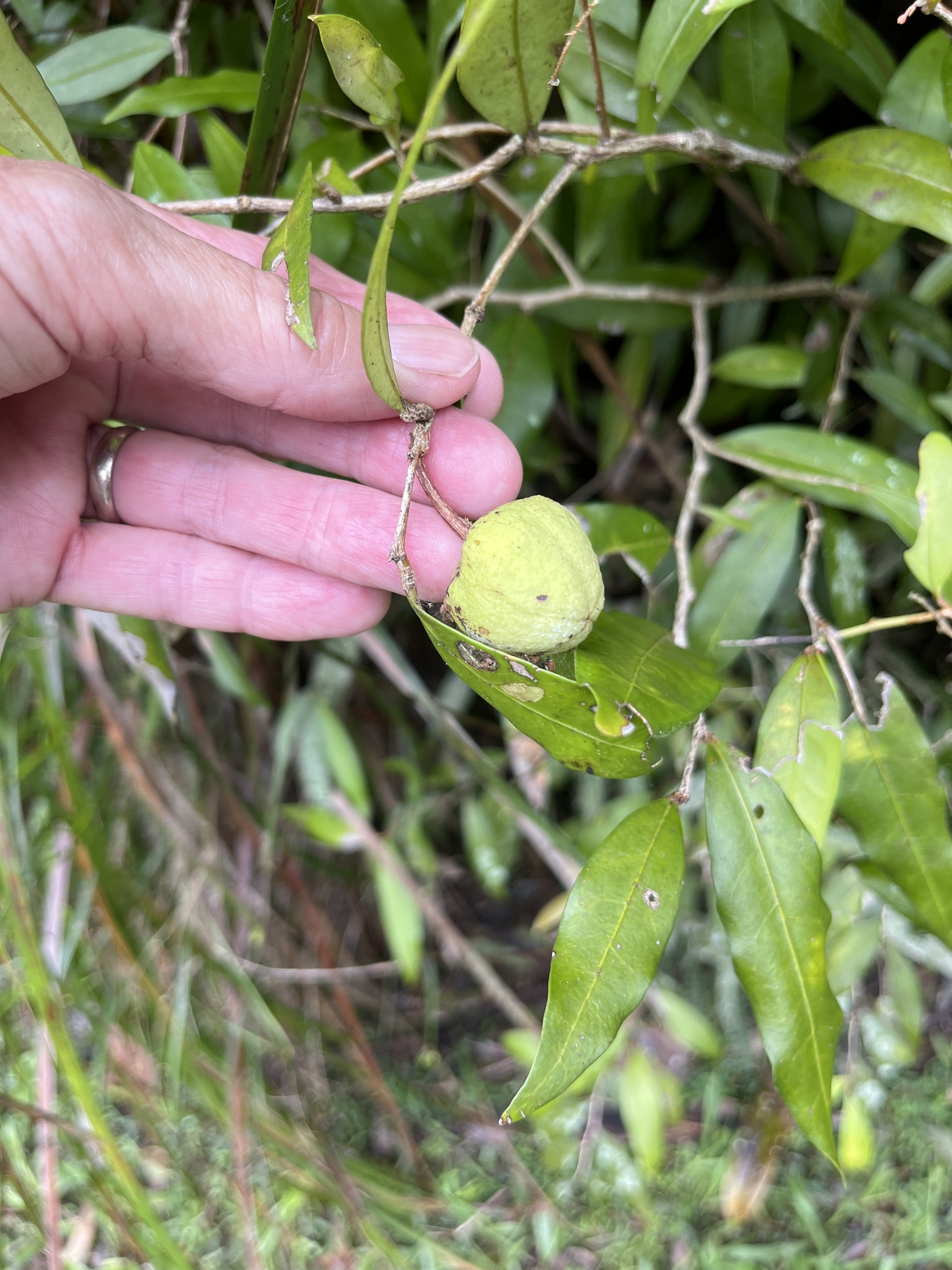
Fruit

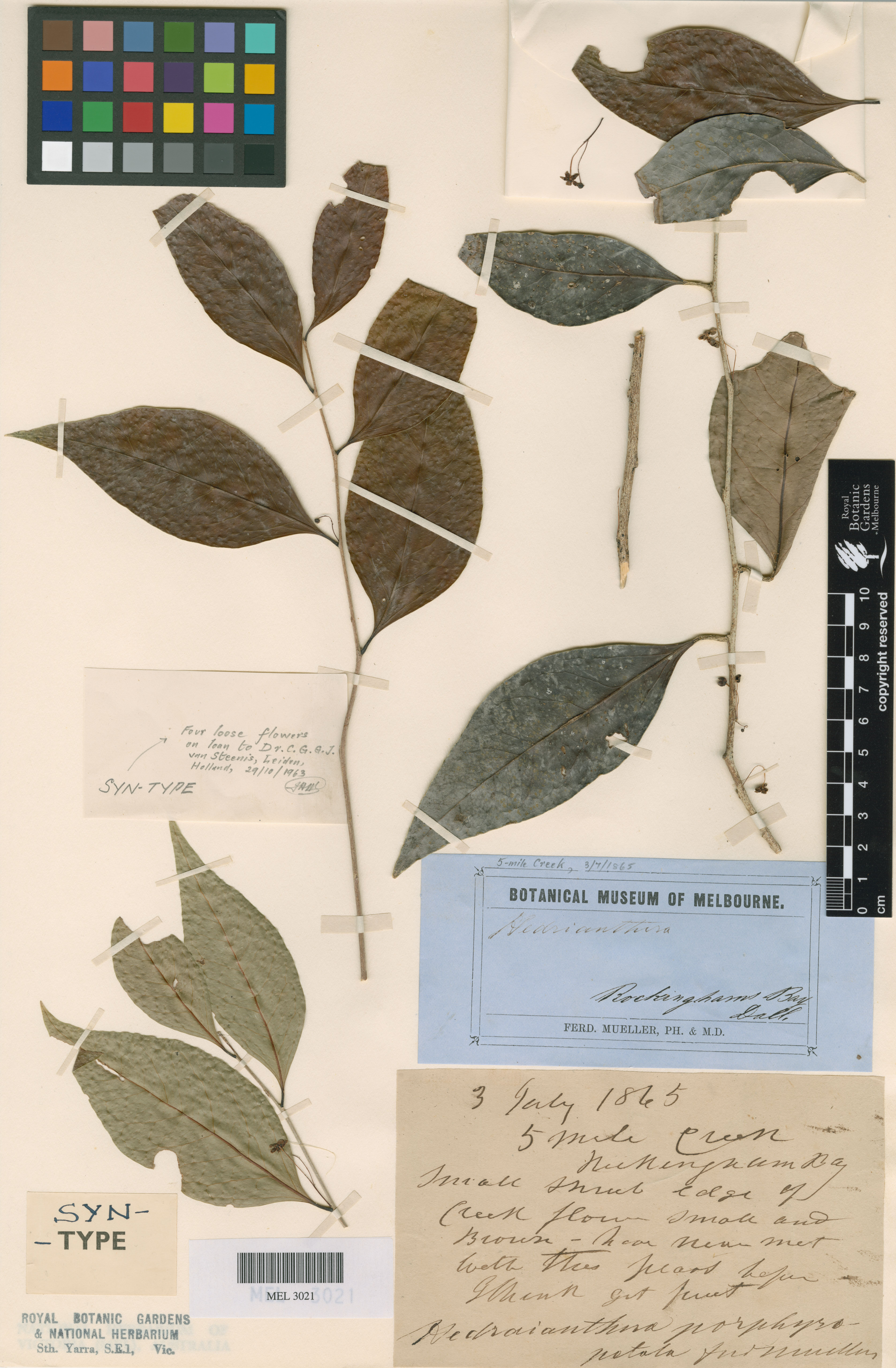
Herbarium specimen (syntype)
