= Alstonville =

Alstonville may refer to:

- Alstonville, New South Wales, a town in New South Wales, Australia
- Alstonville FC, an Australian soccer club from the above town
- Alstonville & District Cricket Club, a cricket club also from Alstonville, NSW
- One of the cultivars of Andesanthus lepidotus (syn. Tibouchina lepidota), an ornamental plant bred by a resident of Alstonville
