= Ballina =

Ballina may refer to:

- Ballina, County Mayo, Ireland, a town
- Ballina, County Tipperary, Ireland, a town
- Ballinea, County Westmeath, Ireland, a village sometimes called Ballina
- Ballina, New South Wales, Australia, a town
  - Electoral district of Ballina, an electoral district in the New South Wales Legislative Assembly, based in the area
  - Ballina Shire, a local government area of which Ballina is the largest town and the administrative centre
- Ballina, a location south of Cazenovia, Madison County, New York, US

== See also ==
- Balina, a surname
- Ballinagh, a village in County Cavan, Ireland
