= Cricket NSW =

Sports governing body in Australia

- Sport: Cricket
- Jurisdiction: New South Wales
- Founded: 1859; 166 years ago
- Affiliation: Cricket Australia
- Headquarters: Cricket Central
- Chairman: John Knox
- CEO: Lee Germon

Official website
- www.cricketnsw.com.au
- (New South Wales)
- (Australia)

Cricket NSW (officially known as the New South Wales Cricket Association) is an Australian sporting association that administers cricket in New South Wales. It is based at the Sydney Olympic Park. The New South Wales Blues, the New South Wales Breakers, the Sydney Thunder and the Sydney Sixers are a part of the association.

== History ==
Cricket NSW was established in 1859. William Tunks and Richard Driver were the inaugural joint secretaries of the association. The current CEO is Lee Germon. The organisation was based next to the Sydney Cricket Ground for decades. However, in 2019 the organisation moved to temporary offices in the Sydney Olympic Park precinct, and in 2022 they moved to a new facility built on the north side of the Olympic Park precinct along the Parramatta River.

== Board of directors ==
Cricket NSW is governed by nine directors. The current members of the board are:

| Name | Role(s) |
|---|---|
| John Knox | Chairman since June 2018 |
| Karen Robbins | Director |
| Ed Cowan | Director |
| Paul Marjoribanks | Director |
| Neil Maxwell | Director |
| Richard Timbs | Director |
| David Gallop | Director |
| The Hon. Kevin Greene | Director |
| Courtenay Smith | Director |

== See also ==
- Cricket in New South Wales
- Country Cricket New South Wales
