= Balinas =

Balinas is may refer to:

- Antonio Rodríguez Balinas (1928–2011), first commander of the Office of the First U.S. Army Deputy Command.
- Rosendo Balinas Jr. (1941–1998), chess grandmaster from the Philippines
- Balinas, Arabic form of Apollonius, the attributed author of Sirr al-khaliqa

== See also ==
- Balina, a surname
- Bâlines, a commune in the Eure department in Normandy in northern France
