= Lute Drummond =

Australian operatic coach (1879–1949)

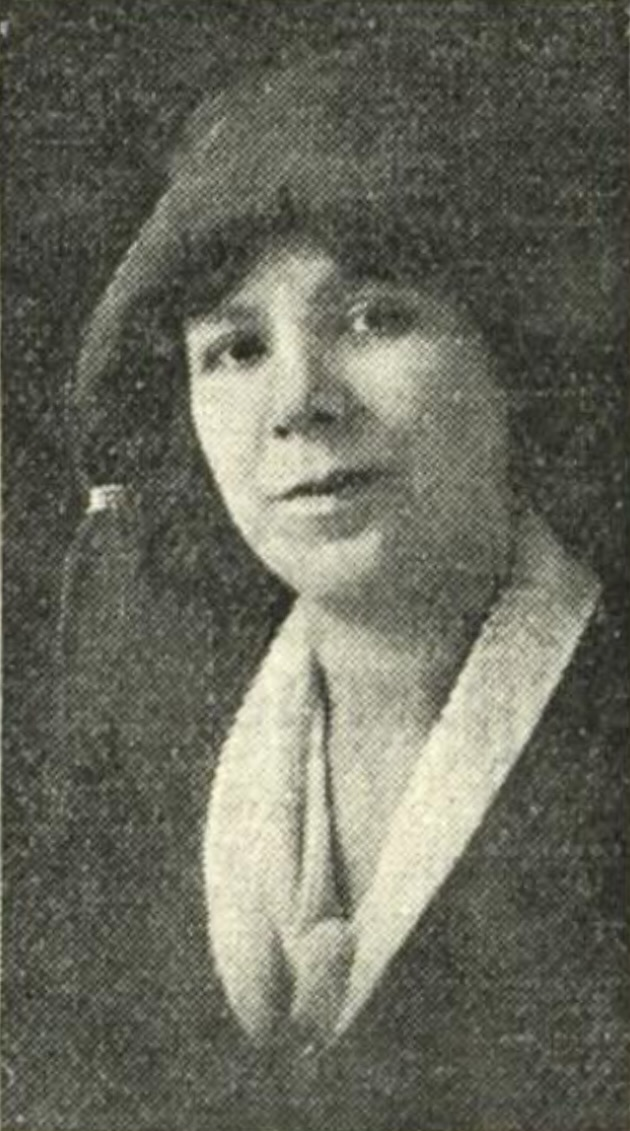
Lute Drummond in 1922

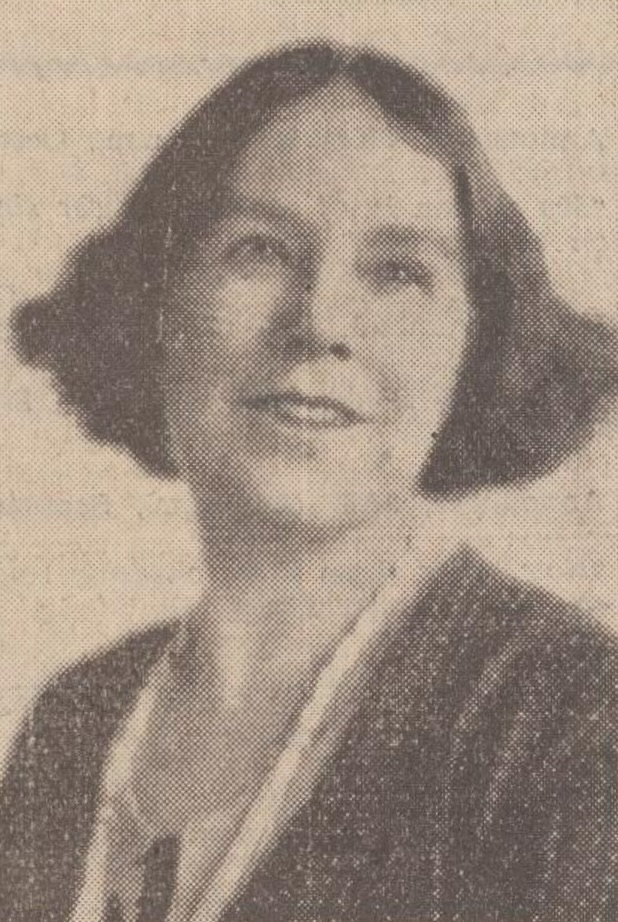
Lute Drummond in 1933

Lute Drummond or Ruth Janet Drummond (6 September 1879 – 27 May 1949) was an operatic coach and music director from Australia.

== Biography ==
Drummond was born in Ulmarra in New South Wales and was the eighth of nine children born to James and Annie Drummond and she received very little formal schooling in her early years. In 1893, when she was a teenager, the family moved to Ballina and later, for an unknown period she went to Perth in Western Australia with her younger sister Jean.

In 1907, when she was in her 20's, Drummond travelled to Berlin where she studied piano with Edwin Fischer as well as studying German and Italian literature. During this period she also acted as her sister Jean's accompanist when she was training as a dramatic soprano.

After the breakout of World War I the sister remained in Germany where they were under the protection of the American embassy and, in 1918, they were among the first British women to be exchanged and were able to travel to London. They would later state that while in Berlin they suffered no hardships, but did have much humiliation. Drummond later travelled to Italy where she had obtained operatic engagements. While in Italy Drummond translated to opera Il Trittico, by Giacomo Puccini, into English. Drummond and her sister returned to Australia around 1920 when their family expressed concern about the Spanish Flu.

On her return to Australia Drummond stayed with the Ainsworth family, which included her niece Ruth Drummond Ainsworth, at Warrawee in Sydney and, in 1921, joined an Italian opera company (led by Ercole Filippini) which was touring Queensland. Upon her return she organised opera recitals at the Sydney Conservatorium of Music to raise funds for a 'National Opera House' which was a cause she championed for much of her life; she was also passionate about the free libraries movement.

Between 1922 and 1924 Drummond also toured Europe extensively with her nieces Fay and Ruth Ainsworth and some other young women. During this visit she went to the Anthroposophical Society in Switzerland where she was one of the initial Australian members. Later, between and 1948 she was the general secretary for them in Australia.

In the 1930s when Drummond was living in Sydney she taught and lectured from her home in the city and her students included Joan Hammond and Kenneth Neate. In 1935 she also directed a classical and sacred drama entitled ‘Iphigenia', alongside Marion Mahony Griffin, at an open-air theatre at Castlecrag as a part of the anthroposophical movement.

In 1936 she produced the first of several opera series for the Australian Broadcasting Commission.

During World War II Drummond arranged musical programs in army camps and hospitals.

Around 1948 Drummond was diagnosed with cancer and, to assist her, a gala concert was held at the Theatre Royal on 5 August 1948 which raised over £1000 for her treatment and associated needs. She died on 27 May 1949 in Lindfield.

== Collections ==
The papers of Drummond are available at the National Library of Australia:

Papers of Lute Drummond, 1937-1978 [manuscript]

== Legacy ==
The high school building at the Glenaeon Rudolf Steiner School is named for Drummond.
