= Rosina Raisbeck =

Australian singer (1916–2006)

Phyllis Rosina Raisbeck MBE (28 July 1916 – 23 December 2006) was an Australian opera and concert soprano and mezzo-soprano singer. Her fine voice was basically a dramatic mezzo, with a warm middle register supporting strong top notes.

== Early life ==
Rosina Raisbeck was born Ballarat, Victoria on 28 July 1916 but grew up in Maitland and Newcastle, New South Wales. In 1942 she began vocal studies at the New South Wales Conservatorium of Music in Sydney, where she worked for five years. During that period she sang with the opera school in Jacques Offenbach's The Tales of Hoffmann and in 1944 she took part in the first performance of The Pearl Tree by Edgar Bainton, the English composer who was director of the conservatorium. The Pearl Tree, though written many years before, was given a glowing review by Neville Cardus in the Sydney Morning Herald.

She ended her studies in 1946 by winning the Australian Broadcasting Commission's Concerto and Vocal Competition, and the Sun Aria (City of Sydney) competition. Early newspaper reports made much of her outstanding physique (a slim 6'1" – 190 cm) and vocal range (D_{3} to E_{6} – over three octaves).

== Performance career ==
After a concert tour of New Zealand, Raisbeck sailed for London with her husband James Laurie, whom she had married in 1943. A letter of recommendation from Eugene Goossens, newly appointed Director of the Conservatory, obtained her an audition at the recently formed Covent Garden Opera Company (now the Royal Opera) and she made her début as Maddalena in Verdi's Rigoletto, later singing such roles as Flora in La traviata, Second Lady in Mozart's The Magic Flute, Mercedes in Bizet's Carmen, Wellgunde in Wagner's Das Rheingold and Rossweisse in Die Walküre.

Advised by the conductor Sir Thomas Beecham to become a soprano, Raisbeck studied with the tenor Dino Borgioli and from 1950 onwards she added Ortrud in Lohengrin, Senta in The Flying Dutchman, Third Norn in Götterdämmerung (all by Wagner), and First Lady in The Magic Flute to her repertory. Raisbeck was a tall, imposing woman and managed to appear the very embodiment of evil in that role. She often sang alongside her fellow Australian Kenneth Neate. After leaving Covent Garden in 1953, she sang frequently in concert, and was one of the huge choir at Westminster Abbey that sang during the Coronation of Queen Elizabeth II.

Raisbeck planned to tour Australia the following year with Benjamin Fuller's Italian Opera, but, finding that she was pregnant, cancelled the tour. After her son was born, she did not sing again until 1958, when she gave guest performances of Ortrud and the title role of Beethoven's Fidelio with the Elizabethan Trust Opera Company in Sydney. Returning to London she sang with Sadler's Wells Opera in 1959, as Senta, and Elisabeth in Tannhäuser, as well as the Mother in the British premiere of Luigi Dallapiccola's The Prisoner, given by the New Opera Company at Sadler's Wells.

In 1961, she gave a dramatic performance of Kabanisha in Leoš Janáček's Káťa Kabanová. Then, having divorced her husband, she returned to Australia with her son.

For the next 10 years, Raisbeck sang wherever and whatever she could: a tremendously successful production of The Sound of Music, in which she sang the Abbess, with June Bronhill as Maria, was followed by Carousel. She gave concerts, and she sang in clubs and cabaret. Then in 1969 the Elizabethan Trust evolved into the Australian Opera; Raisbeck sang with the company from 1971 for the rest of her career.

Her first role was Marcellina in Mozart's The Marriage of Figaro, followed by Akhrosimova in Prokofiev's War and Peace (1973; the first opera performed at the Sydney Opera House); she scored triumphs as Mrs Begbick in Kurt Weill's Rise and Fall of the City of Mahagonny (1975) and as Herodias in Richard Strauss's Salome (1976).

Raisbeck had sung in all three of the operas making up Puccini's Il trittico – as La Frugola in Il tabarro, as the Princess in Suor Angelica and as Zita in Gianni Schicchi – soon after joining the Australian Opera. In 1977, she sang the Princess again, opposite Joan Sutherland as Suor Angelica.

The Duchess of Plaza Toro in Gilbert and Sullivan's The Gondoliers and the Countess in Tchaikovsky's The Queen of Spades were both successful; so was Kabanisha (1980).

Raisbeck's career formally ended in 1985 with a much-admired performance of the First Prioress in Poulenc's Dialogues of the Carmelites. She sang on for another three years, finally retiring in 1988, aged 72.

== Death ==
She died on 23 December 2006, after a long illness, at age 90.

== Honours ==
Raisbeck was appointed a Member of the Order of the British Empire (MBE) in the 1977 New Years Honours.
