= Ballina Bears Cricket Club =

Ballina Bears
- Nickname: The Bears
- Sport: Cricket
- Founded: ~1902 (The Bears from 1989)
- First season: 1989–90
- League: LJ Hooker League
- Home ground: Fripp Oval
- Colours: (from 1995) (1989–1995)
- Website: Official website

The Ballina Bears Cricket Club are a club based in the Ballina district on the Far North Coast of New South Wales, Australia.

The club has existed since at least 1902, under various names associated with local watering holes. The club became a stand-alone entity (the Bears) in 1989, with Adam Bailey as founding President. With the establishment of the LJ Hooker League in 1994/95 the first-grade side now competes at a regional level, with the lower grades still playing in Ballina competition. The first-grade side also plays annually against the Tintenbar club for the "David Dawson Shield" — named in honour of David Dawson, a regular and popular 1st grade player, who died in July 1994.

In 2014, the club celebrated its 25th anniversary and a Bears Best Team was named. The players selected were: Greg Weller, Todd Campbell, Peter Hall*, Justin Moore*, Nathan Anson, Andrew Gordon, David Schweitzer (WK), Sam Adams, Jason Holmes (Captain), Shane Jacobs, John Weller and Phil Alley. Those with an asterisk (*) represented NSW Country while playing for the Bears. Club stalwart Geoff Jacobs was also recognised by being named the first "Immortal Bear".

The Bears have won the LJ Hooker League on 4 occasions: 1995/96, 2008/09, 2011/12 (joint) and 2013/14.

The following Bears players have been "LJ Hooker League Player of the Year": Shane Jacobs (1996/97) and Sam Adams (2010/11, 2011/12, 2012/13).

In January 2019, the NSW State Government announced $40,000 in funding to rebuild the picket-fence at Fripp Oval.(subscription required)

== See also ==
- List of cricket clubs in Australia

== Sources ==
- Hall, Glen (1983). Port of Richmond River: Ballina 1840s to 1980s. Ballina Shire Council. ISBN 0-9598257-5-4.
