= Xavier Catholic College, Ballina =

Xavier Catholic College

Location
- Skennars Head, Ballina, New South Wales; Australia; 28°49′50″S 153°36′00″E

Information
- Type: Independent co-educational secondary day school
- Motto: Act Justly
- Religious affiliation: Jesuit (companion school)
- Denomination: Roman Catholicism
- Patron saint: St Francis Xavier
- Established: 30 January 2000; 26 years ago
- Educational authority: New South Wales Department of Education
- Oversight: Catholic Schools Office, Diocese of Lismore
- Principal: Michael Campbell
- Years: 7–12
- Enrolment: 900 (2014)
- Campus type: Regional
- Colors: Dark blue, white, red
- Website: www.xavierlism.catholic.edu.au

Xavier Catholic College is an independent Roman Catholic co-educational secondary day school, located in the Northern Rivers regional town of Ballina, New South Wales, Australia. A Companion School of the Society of Jesus (or Jesuits), the school was founded in 2000 and is administered by the Catholic Schools Office of the Diocese of Lismore.

The college takes its name from St Francis Xavier, a Jesuit priest who evangelised Asia and the Pacific. Together with Mary Help of Christians, he is the patron saint of Australia. St Francis studied at the University of Paris where he met St Ignatius of Loyola and became one of the seven who founded the Society of Jesus and the Jesuits.

== Houses ==
=== Campion House ===
Campion House is named for St Edmund Campion, an English Jesuit priest and martyr. Sent by the Jesuits to England so as to minister to English Catholics, Edmund was eventually tortured and executed for preaching the Catholic faith in Anglican England. The house colour is red; the house motto is Lead By Example.

=== Faber House ===
Faber House is named for Peter Faber, the first Jesuit priest and theologian. He founded the Society of Jesus with St Ignatius Loyola and St Francis Xavier and was the first among the original founders to be ordained. The house colour is white; the house motto is Open Hearts.

=== Ignatius House ===
Ignatius House is named for St Ignatius Loyola, who founded the Jesuit order of priests. He gave up his wealthy lifestyle to live an existence of poverty and devotion to God. He was the founder of Ignatian spirituality and devoted his life to the greater glory of God. The Ignatius House aims to act with charity, humility and dignity in all aspects of College life. The house colour is green; the house motto is Do More, Be More.

=== MacKillop House ===
St Mary of the Cross MacKillop, the patron of Mackillop House, was canonised in 2010. She co-founded the Sisters of St Joseph of the Sacred Heart in 1866 and believed in education for the poor and underprivileged. Mackillop House is guided by her saying "never see a need without doing something about it". The house colour is gold; the house motto is Challenge With Courage.

=== McAuley House ===
Catherine McAuley established the first Mercy congregation in Ireland in 1831. Throughout her life Catherine dedicated herself to helping the poor, offering hope and essential services for the underprivileged and socially disadvantaged. McCauley House was established in 2009 with the original members endeavouring to follow the ideals of its patron - to strive for success and embrace every opportunity enthusiastically but with compassion, charity and justice at the centre of our action. The house colour is pink; the house motto is Mercy in Action.

=== Nagle House ===
Nano Nagle believed that education was the way for a person to make change in their life. She was an advocate of the poor. In 1775 she founded the congregation of the Presentation Sisters and became known as the 'woman of the welcoming heart'. Members of Nagle House endeavour to act in a spirit of selflessness, determination and devotion - traits that characterised their patron. The house colour is blue; the house motto is Deeds Not Words.

== East Timor Program ==
Xavier Catholic College runs charity Mufti Days, where they often collect gold coin donations. These donations fund the toilets at Timor Leste. The college had almost built a toilet block as of 2024. The college has also helped fund three classrooms and new computers for the students. Year 12 students and teachers often visit East Timor to view these toilets and the communities as part of immersion programs.

In 2019 the College signed a Sister-School Memorandum of Understanding with Our Lady of Fatima High School in Turiscai.

== See also ==
- List of Catholic schools in New South Wales
- Catholic education in Australia
