= Brassiantha =

Scientific classification
- Kingdom: Plantae
- Clade: Tracheophytes
- Clade: Angiosperms
- Clade: Eudicots
- Clade: Rosids
- Order: Celastrales
- Family: Celastraceae
- Genus: Brassiantha; A.C.Sm.

Genus of flowering plants

Brassiantha is a genus of flowering plants belonging to the family Celastraceae.

Its native range is New Guinea and Queensland.

Species:

- Brassiantha hedraiantheroides A.J.Ford – Queensland
- Brassiantha pentamera A.C.Sm. – New Guinea
