= Tintenbar-East Ballina Cricket Club =

Cricket club in New South Wales, Australia

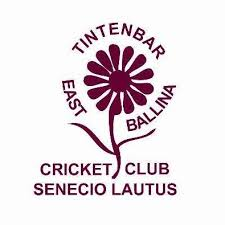
- Nickname: The Bar
- Sport: Cricket
- League: LJ Hooker League
- Home ground: Kingsford Smith Park
- Colours
- Website: Official website

The Tintenbar-East Ballina Cricket Club is a club based in the Ballina district.

With the establishment of the LJ Hooker League in 1994/95 the first-grade side now competes at a regional level, with the lower grades still playing in Ballina competition. The first-grade side also plays annually against the Ballina Bears for the "David Dawson Shield"—named in honour of David Dawson, a regular and popular 1st grade player, who died in July 1994.

The Bar have won the LJ Hooker League on 3 occasions: 2000/01, 2002/03 and 2005/06.

The following club players have been "LJ Hooker League Player of the Year": Brett Crawford (1997/98, 2003/04, 2005/06 and 2007/08) Phil Alley (2002/03) and Abe Crawford (2015/16).

== See also ==
- List of cricket clubs in Australia
