= Kenneth Neate =

- Ken Neate (photo with 1952 dedication)

Background information
- Born: 28 July 1914
- Origin: Cessnock, New South Wales, Australia
- Died: 27 June 1997 (aged 82) Munich, Germany
- Genres: Wagnerian opera
- Occupations: tenor singer, opera producer, teacher
- Years active: 1938–1975

Kenneth (Ken) Neate (28 July 1914 – 27 June 1997) was an Australian operatic and concert tenor, opera producer and singing teacher, composer and author. He appeared at the Bayreuth Festival in 1963 as Loge in Das Rheingold and was noted as a dramatic tenor in German, French, and Italian repertoire in opera houses in England, France, Italy, Austria, Germany, and Australia. His operatic career lasted 38 years, followed by ten years as lecturer in Voice and Opera Studies at the Richard Strauss Conservatorium in Munich.

== Biography ==
Ken Neate was born in Cessnock, New South Wales on 28 July 1914. He studied piano and voice in Newcastle and had further study in Sydney with Lute Drummond and Lionello Cecil. Neate joined the New South Wales Police Force, serving in inner-city stations in Sydney. He became a soloist in the NSW Police Choir and soon became known as "The Singing Policeman".

He sang his first operatic roles as Pinkerton in Madama Butterfly in Brisbane in 1937 and the title role in a concert performance of Lohengrin with the Melbourne Symphony Orchestra under the baton of Joseph Post.

After hearing Neate sing in 1939, John Brownlee introduced him to the Metropolitan Opera in New York City, and recommended he study with his own teacher, Emilio de Gogorza, and with Elisabeth Schumann. In 1941, he toured New Zealand with Oscar Natzka. That year, he studied roles such as Don José (Carmen) with Brownlee, and Lohengrin with Lotte Lehmann. He auditioned for Bruno Walter, which led to his becoming understudy to Charles Kullman for The Magic Flute at the Met. In 1941, he joined the Royal Canadian Air Force, becoming a pilot officer. He had already appeared in opera and concert under the direction of Sir Thomas Beecham in Montreal, Quebec, Canada.

After the war, he appeared as Don José in Carmen at the Royal Opera House, Covent Garden in 1947 in the very first performance by the Covent Garden Opera Company (later to become the Royal Opera); that season, he also appeared as Tamino in The Magic Flute, and as the Italian Singer in Der Rosenkavalier. That year he sang the title role in Gounod's Faust for the first time (he was to sing the role over 80 times until 1965, in Europe, the UK and Australia). In 1948 he sang Alfredo in La traviata opposite Elisabeth Schwarzkopf.

In 1950 and 1951, Ken Neate sang the roles of Rodolfo (La bohème), Cavaradossi (Tosca), and Pinkerton (Madama Butterfly) in productions televised by the BBC. He often appeared with his fellow Australian Rosina Raisbeck at Covent Garden.

He made the first of five tours to Australia in 1952. He returned in 1955 (when he appeared with an Italian touring company alongside Gabriella Tucci and the up-and-coming Donald Smith), 1960, 1968 and 1970 (that year as Florestan in Fidelio).

In May 1956 at Bordeaux, Neate created the title role in Henri Tomasi's Sampiero Corso, which was repeated at the Holland Festival in June. That year, Neate sang in the first television recordings for Italian Radio and Television of La fanciulla del West, Turandot and Alfredo Catalani's Loreley.

Neate's lyric tenor had developed into a heldentenor by the end of the 1950s. He sang Tannhäuser over 160 times in German. In Germany he met and married the German mezzo-soprano Gertrud Vollath. He also sang Stolzing in Die Meistersinger von Nürnberg (Vienna State Opera and Zurich Opera), Eric, Lohengrin and Siegmund (Die Walküre). At the Bayreuth Festival of 1963 he sang the role of Loge in Das Rheingold, at the invitation of Wolfgang Wagner and Rudolf Kempe, becoming the first Australian to sing a major role at Bayreuth. He studied heldentenor roles with Max Lorenz.

In Italy in the mid-1950s, he had a major career in the houses of San Carlo (Naples), La Fenice (Venice), Parma and Bologna, in roles such as Faust, Calaf (Turandot) and Don Carlo, and appearing with such major names as Tullio Serafin, Carlo Tagliabue, Cesare Siepi, Ettore Bastianini, Gigliola Frazzoni, Antonietta Stella and Ebe Stignani.

In 1956 he released his first solo LP Una Serata Dell'Opera with the Orchestre Philharmonique de Paris under Napoleone Annovazzi (now available on CD).

The 1959 Franco Zeffirelli production of Lucia di Lammermoor at Covent Garden is famous for Joan Sutherland's breakthrough performance in the title role. The tenor role of Edgardo in that production was sung by Ken Neate, who replaced the scheduled tenor at short notice.

On 26 October 1961, Neate created the role of Danforth in the world premiere of Robert Ward's The Crucible at the New York City Opera. That year he also sang there as Radames in Aida, Don José, and Stravinsky's Oedipus rex.

In 1957 he became a principal tenor at the Paris Opera. In Paris and other centres in France, he sang Arnold (Guillaume Tell) at the Opéra Comique in 1954, Roméo (Roméo et Juliette) and Hoffmann (Les Contes d'Hoffmann). In Paris, he studied with Lucien Muratore, who presented Ken with several of his own costumes including that of Don José and his swords and daggers.

In 1966 and 1967 he appeared opposite Birgit Nilsson in a new production of Tristan und Isolde at the Royal Opera in Stockholm, and at Expo 67 in Montreal. The role of Brangäne was sung by Kerstin Meyer.

Ken Neate also sang the Richard Strauss roles of Aegisth, Bacchus and Apollo. However, his repertoire was not confined to opera. He sang in such works as Beethoven's 9th Symphony, Mahler's Symphony of a Thousand and Das Lied von der Erde, Schoenberg's Gurre-Lieder, Handel oratorios, Dvořák's Stabat Mater, and the Requiems of Mozart, Verdi and Berlioz (Grande Messe des morts), under such conductors as Sir Thomas Beecham, Antal Doráti, Eduard van Beinum, Jascha Horenstein, Josef Krips, Rudolf Kempe, Wolfgang Sawallisch and Carlo Maria Giulini.

On his return to Australia to sing Tannhäuser in 1968, his voice was showing signs of degeneration. His last performance in opera was in the title role of Verdi's Otello at Tiroler Landestheater Innsbruck in 1975. Although he was then aged 61, his interpretation of Otello was highly praised, both vocally and dramatically.

Neate also produced operas in Ireland and Austria, such as Il trovatore, Don Carlo, Tosca, Samson and Delilah, Tannhäuser and Fidelio. He also wrote some songs (Homeward calling; I am off to Kambalda).

Ken Neate died in Munich, Germany on 27 June 1997. His book Great singing: Common Sense in Singing was completed at his death, and was published in 2001 by his widow.

His maternal cousin was the tenor Jon Weaving.
