= Cricket in Victoria =

- Governing body: Cricket Victoria
- Representative team: Victoria
- First played: 1838, Melbourne

Cricket in Victoria, Australia, has a rich and storied history, deeply ingrained in the cultural fabric of the state. From iconic cricketing venues to grassroots clubs nurturing future stars, Victoria has made significant contributions to the sport both domestically and internationally.

== History ==
Cricket was first played in Victoria during the early years of British colonization in the 19th century. The sport quickly gained popularity, with matches organised in various towns and settlements across the state. The Melbourne Cricket Club (MCC), founded in 1838, played a pivotal role in promoting cricket and establishing it as a significant sporting pursuit in Victoria.

The Melbourne Cricket Ground, affectionately known as the MCG, is synonymous with cricket in Victoria. Established in 1853, the MCG is one of the world's most renowned cricket stadiums, boasting a capacity of over 100,000 spectators. It has been the venue for numerous historic cricketing events, including Test matches, One Day Internationals (ODIs), and World Cup finals.

== Governing body ==
Cricket Victoria (CV) serves as the official governing body for cricket in the state. Established in 1875, CV oversees various aspects of the sport, including:

- Managing over 1,000 cricket clubs and close to half a million registered players.
- Administering competitions across different age groups and skill levels.
- Providing professional and semi-professional contracts to cricketers.
- Overseeing the Victorian men's and women's representative teams.
- Owning and operating the Melbourne Stars and Melbourne Renegades teams.

== Victorian cricket team ==
The Victorian cricket team, represents the state of Victoria in Australian domestic cricket. The team competes in the Sheffield Shield, Australia's premier domestic first-class cricket competition, as well as the Marsh One-Day Cup. Over the years, the Victorian team has been a dominant force in Australian cricket, producing numerous international players and winning multiple domestic titles.

== Women's cricket ==
Women's cricket has seen significant growth and development in Victoria in recent years, due to initiatives aimed at promoting gender equality and inclusion in the sport. The Victorian Women's Cricket Team competes in domestic competitions such as the Women's National Cricket League (WNCL) and the Women's Big Bash League (WBBL), contributing to the overall growth and popularity of women's cricket in Australia.

== Notable players ==
Victoria has produced major figures in cricketing history. Cricketers such as Shane Warne, Bill Ponsford, and Keith Miller are synonymous with Victorian cricket and have left an indelible mark on the sport both domestically and internationally. Their achievements continue to inspire generations of aspiring cricketers in Victoria and beyond.

== See also ==
- Cricket in Australia
- Cricket in New South Wales
- Cricket in Norfolk Island
- Cricket in Queensland
- Cricket in Western Australia
