= Ruth Drummond Ainsworth =

Australian artist

Ruth Drummond Ainsworth (7 September 1900 - 24 May 2004) was a painter, printmaker, potter, weaver and art teacher. She was inspired by the influences of cubism, surrealism and the modern art movement generally.

== Biography ==
Ainsworth was born in Ballina, New South Wales and she grew up in Warrawee on Sydney's upper north shore. Ainsworth died in 2004.

== Education ==
In 1921 Ainsworth began a Bachelor of Arts at the University of Sydney, studying English, history, and philosophy.

In 1922 Ainsworth enrolled part-time at Julian Ashton Art School in Sydney and, in 1923 she travelled to Europe with her aunt Lute Drummond, an opera singer, where she was inspired by the art that she saw there, especially the cubist and surrealist works and it inspired her arts practice. When she returned to Sydney she decided to give up her earlier studies and enrolled, now full-time, at Julian Ashtons.

In 1928 Ainsworth became the Art Mistress of Frensham School, a private girls school in Mittagong, New South Wales.

== Influences ==
Ainsworth came into contact with some of the artists who became involved in the modernist movement in Sydney: Grace Crowley (1890–1979), Anne Dangar (1885–1951), Margaret Preston (1875–1963) and Thea Proctor (1879–1966).

Ainsworth was a student of Thea Proctor, who had begun to teach design at the Sydney Art School in 1926.

== Artworks ==
- The tightrope walker, 1927.
- Poppies, 1927.
- Merry-go-round, 1927.
- The gypsies, 1927.
