= Balina =

Balina is a surname. Notable people with the surname include:

- Aloysius Balina (1945–2012), Tanzanian Roman Catholic bishop
- Theodore Balina (fl. 1598), Ottoman Bulgarian nobleman

== See also ==
- Acraea balina, junior synonym of Acraea uvui, a species of butterfly
- Balina Guri, a 1979 Indian Kannada film
- Balinas (disambiguation)
- Ballina (disambiguation)
- Exercise Mavi Balina, an international anti submarine warfare exercise led by Turkish Naval Forces (2016)
