= 2PAR =

Community radio station in Ballina, New South Wales

Coordinates: 28°52′8.2″S 153°33′43.1″E

New South Wales, Australia; Australia
- Broadcast area: Ballina, Australia
- Frequency: 101.9 MHz
- Branding: Paradise FM 101.9

Programming
- Language: English
- Format: Community radio

Ownership
- Operator: Independent

Links
- Webcast: Listen Live
- Website: www.paradisefm.org.au

Paradise FM (callsign 2PAR) is a community radio station in Ballina, New South Wales.
