= Brassiantha hedraiantheroides =

Scientific classification
- Kingdom: Plantae
- Clade: Embryophytes
- Clade: Tracheophytes
- Clade: Spermatophytes
- Clade: Angiosperms
- Clade: Eudicots
- Clade: Rosids
- Order: Celastrales
- Family: Celastraceae
- Genus: Brassiantha
- Species: B. hedraiantheroides

Binomial name
- Brassiantha hedraiantheroides A.J.Ford

Species of flowering plant

Brassiantha hedraiantheroides is a species of understory shrubs or small trees, constituting part of the plant family Celastraceae. In 2012 botanist Andrew J. Ford formally scientifically named and described them as the first recognised Australian species of the genus Brassiantha. Previously several publications provided informal scientific descriptions of this species under the provisional names "Hedraianthera sp. Mossman (V.K.Moriarty 2557) Qld Herbarium" or "Hedraianthera sp. Mossman".

They are endemic to a restricted area of the wet tropics rainforests of north eastern Queensland, Australia. They grow as understory shrubs or small trees in rainforests and sclerophyll forests from near sea level to about 600 m (2,000 ft) altitude.
