= Brundah =

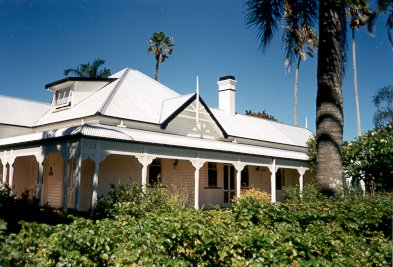

- Location within New South Wales Location within Australia
- 28.8691°S 153.5680°E
- Location: 37 Norton Street, Ballina, Ballina Shire, New South Wales, Australia

History
- Built: 1908

New South Wales Heritage Register
- Official name: Brundah
- Type: state heritage (built)
- Designated: 2 April 1999
- Reference no.: 194
- Type: House
- Category: Residential buildings (private)

Brundah is a heritage-listed private residence at 37 Norton Street, Ballina, in the Northern Rivers region of New South Wales, Australia. It was built in 1908. It was added to the New South Wales State Heritage Register on 2 April 1999.

== History ==
Brundah was built in 1908 for the Lang family of Ballina. Roy Lang was a prominent local auctioneer, estate agent and produce agent whose business extended across the Richmond Valley. It was built shortly after his marriage to Charlotte Robson of Tucki. The cost of building the house totalled £556.

The original property comprised 0.4 hectares, half of which was sold following Roy Lang's death in 1946. The house remained in the Lang family until the death of Charlotte Lang in 1980, aged 101.

== Description ==
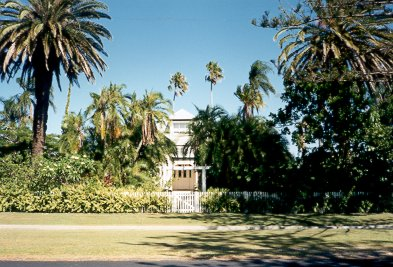
The garden is planted with palms, Norfolk pines, bougainvillea and other shrubs typical of the period

A large intact Federation style timber house with encircling verandahs located on a prominent corner position. It is a single storey building elevated on stumps and has a multi-gabled galvanised iron roof. Elaborate lattice and timber detailing around the verandah combine with adjustable timber venetians to modify the basic design to suit the climate. The mature garden is intact and along with the perimeter fence enhances the aesthetic qualities of the house. The roof has also been utilised as a living space.

The property also contains four Canary Island date palms (Phoenix canariensis) which are old and significant growing at the front of the house, a line of Cabbage tree palms (Livistona australis) and Cocos Island palms (Syagrus romanzoffiana), and an original Hibiscus sp. shrub to the south of the house.

It was reported as being in good physical condition as at 4 March 1998.

== Heritage listing ==
Brundah is an excellent example of the domestic timber architecture once typical of the North Coast area of New South Wales. The house is set in a fine, mature garden and is generally considered the best example of domestic architecture in Ballina. Brundah evokes a way of life. It is a fine example of a building style once typical of the area, but now rare. It provides as a resource for research into early twentieth century domestic life and building construction.

Brundah was listed on the New South Wales State Heritage Register on 2 April 1999 having satisfied the following criteria.

The place is important in demonstrating the course, or pattern, of cultural or natural history in New South Wales.

Brundah was built in 1908 for the Lang family of Ballina.

The place is important in demonstrating aesthetic characteristics and/or a high degree of creative or technical achievement in New South Wales.

A superb unspoilt example of the fine domestic timber architecture once typical of this area set in a garden planted with palms, Norfolk pines, bougainvillea and other shrubs typical of the period.

The place has potential to yield information that will contribute to an understanding of the cultural or natural history of New South Wales.

The house and garden are particularly fine examples of early materials and designs adapted to the climate and conditions of the far northern areas of the State. It provides a resource for research into early twentieth century domestic life and building construction.
