= Ballina, New South Wales =

Town in New South Wales, Australia

Ballina
- Town
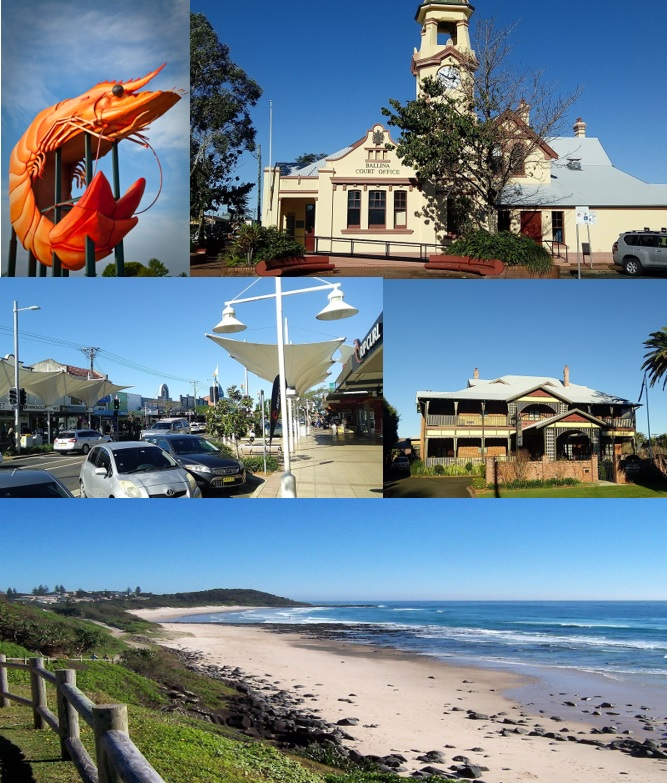
- Clockwise from top left: The Big Prawn, Ballina Court House, Ballina Manor, Shelly Beach, River Street Mall

- Coordinates: 28°51′49″S 153°31′58″E
- Country: Australia
- State: New South Wales
- LGA: Ballina Shire
- Location: 740 km (460 mi) from Sydney; 185 km (115 mi) from Brisbane; 32 km (20 mi) from Lismore; 34 km (21 mi) from Byron Bay; 100 km (62 mi) from Yamba
- Established: 1840s

Government
  - State electorate: Ballina
  - Federal division: Richmond
- Elevation: 1.3 m (4.3 ft)

Population
  - Total: 46,190 (2021)
- Postcode: 2478
- Mean max temp: 24.4 °C (75.9 °F)
- Mean min temp: 14.3 °C (57.7 °F)
- Annual rainfall: 1,817.9 mm (71.57 in)

Ballina (/bælɪnə/ BAL-i-na) is a town in the Northern Rivers region of New South Wales, Australia, and the seat of the Ballina Shire local government area. It lies 740 km (460 mi) north of Sydney and 185 km (115 mi) south of Brisbane. Ballina's urban population at the end of 2021 was 46,190.

The town lies on the Richmond River and serves as a gateway to Byron Bay.

Ballina is located on the ancestral land of the Bundjalung people, who are its traditional owners and original inhabitants. Archaeological evidence demonstrates Bundjalung occupation of the region for at least 6000 years.

== Origin of place name ==
There are a number of theories about where the name Ballina came from including that it is:

- Derived from either a corruption of a clan name for the Bullina or Bul-loona band of the Arakwal people who are a part of the Bundjalung nation.
- That it is a derivation of the Bundjalung language word, bullinah which means "place of many oysters" or "fighting ground" or the word balluna meaning "where the river meets the sea".
- That it was named Ballina by the primarily Irish settlers in the 1840s after the common Irish placename Ballina (Béal an Átha) meaning "mouth of the ford"), which is found in several parts of Ireland.

== History ==
The European establishment of Ballina began in the 1840s on the northern shore of the Richmond River, 20 kilometres south of Cape Byron, Australia's most easterly point. HMS Rainbow, commanded by Capt. Henry Rous, first sailed into the Richmond River in 1828, followed by overland settlers from the Clarence River. In 1842, more settlers arrived on a ship called Sally, forming a settlement at what is now East Ballina on Shaws Bay.

A lighthouse, Richmond River Light, was first constructed in Ballina in 1866, which served as a significant port in the region. The temporary lighthouse was replaced with the current one, designed by James Barnet, in 1879, and first lit in 1880. It is still active. A branch railway line connected Ballina with the Murwillumbah railway line railway at Booyong. The line was opened on 24 August 1930 and closed on 12 January 1949.

=== Landfalls ===
Ballina has a number of famous "landfalls" associated with it. In 1928, Charles Kingsford Smith's plane, the Southern Cross, crossed the coast over Ballina after its epic journey across the Pacific Ocean. Ballina had a festival associated with the event during the 1970s and 1980s, and a school in East Ballina bears the name "Southern Cross".

In 1973, the Las Balsas rafts were towed into Ballina by fishing trawlers after their journey from Ecuador. One of the rafts is preserved at the Ballina Naval & Maritime Museum. They had planned to arrive in Mooloolaba in Queensland, but currents forced them off their course. Their journey was almost twice as long as the Kon-Tiki expeditions of 1947 and proved that people could have travelled across the Pacific in ancient times.

== Heritage listings ==
Ballina has a number of heritage-listed sites, including:

- 37 Norton Street: Brundah

== Location ==
It is approximately 700 km (435 mi) north of Sydney and 160 km (99 mi) south of Brisbane. Ballina is a coastal town and is connected to the Pacific Highway which now bypasses it.

The Richmond River was an important transport route for the region for the first 100 years after settlement. The river and its estuaries abound with marine wildlife and provide for recreational fishing and water sports.

== Demographics ==
Historical population
Year	Pop.	±%
1921	2,768	—
1933	3,042	+9.9%
1947	3,202	+5.3%
1954	3,558	+11.1%
1961	4,129	+16.0%
1966	4,933	+19.5%
1971	6,141	+24.5%
1976	7,323	+19.2%
1981	9,738	+33.0%
1986	12,398	+27.3%
1991	14,554	+17.4%
1996	16,056	+10.3%
2001	16,517	+2.9%
2006	16,477	−0.2%
2011	16,843	+2.2%
2016	19,495	+15.7%
2021	20,543	+5.4%
Source: Australian Bureau of Statistics data. Note: from 2011, population includes figures from newly-separated Cumbalum.

The population of Ballina township was 18,532 at the 2021 Census (representing 40 percent of the Ballina Shire population of 46,296). The urban area had a population of 46,190, which includes Lennox Head and other suburban areas.

Aboriginal and Torres Strait Islander people made up 3.3% of the population; compared with the national and state average of 2.9%.

The most common ancestries in the area were English 31.2%, Australian 28.3%, Irish 10.9%, Scottish 8.7% and German 3.2%. 81.0% of people were born in Australia. The next most common countries of birth were England 3.4%, New Zealand 1.7%, Scotland 0.5% and South Africa 0.4%. 13.3% of people had both parents born overseas. 88.7% of people only spoke English at home.

The most common responses for religion in the area were No Religion 30.2%, Catholic 23.0% and Anglican 19.6%.

== Economy ==
The median household income was estimated to be A$1,093 per week, with the median mortgage repayments estimated at A$1,733 per month, and median rent estimated at A$345 per week. The average number of motor vehicles was 1.6 per dwelling.

Ballina serves as a tourism gateway to the close by destinations of Lismore and Byron Bay. The town has access to several beaches, such as Shelly, Lighthouse, Angels, Flat Rock and Sharpes beaches.

It is also home to historical sites such as the Ballina Manor and the Ballina Naval & Maritime Museum, however its most famous landmark is the "Big Prawn".

== The Big Prawn ==
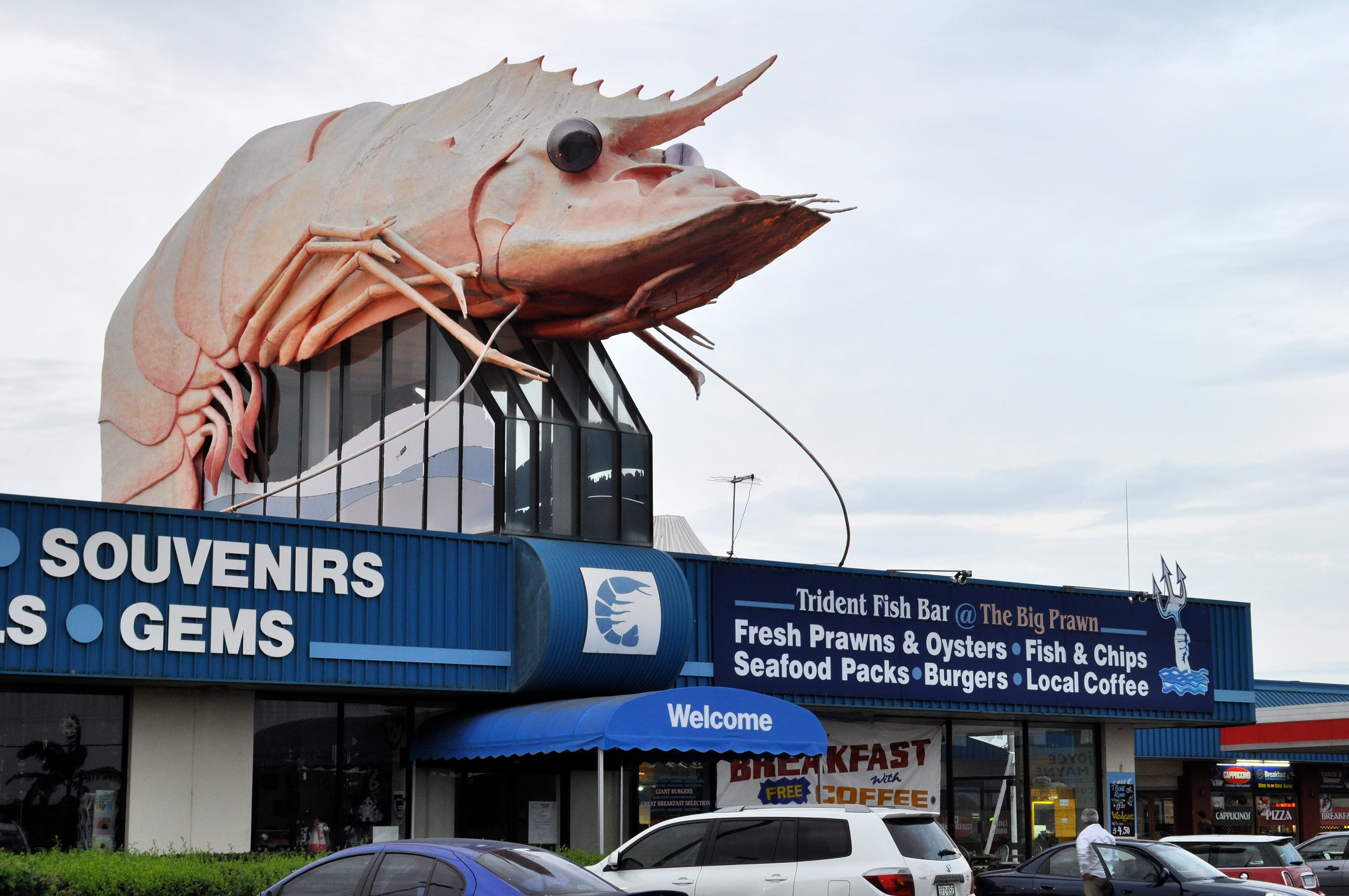
The Big Prawn, prior to refurbishment, 2009

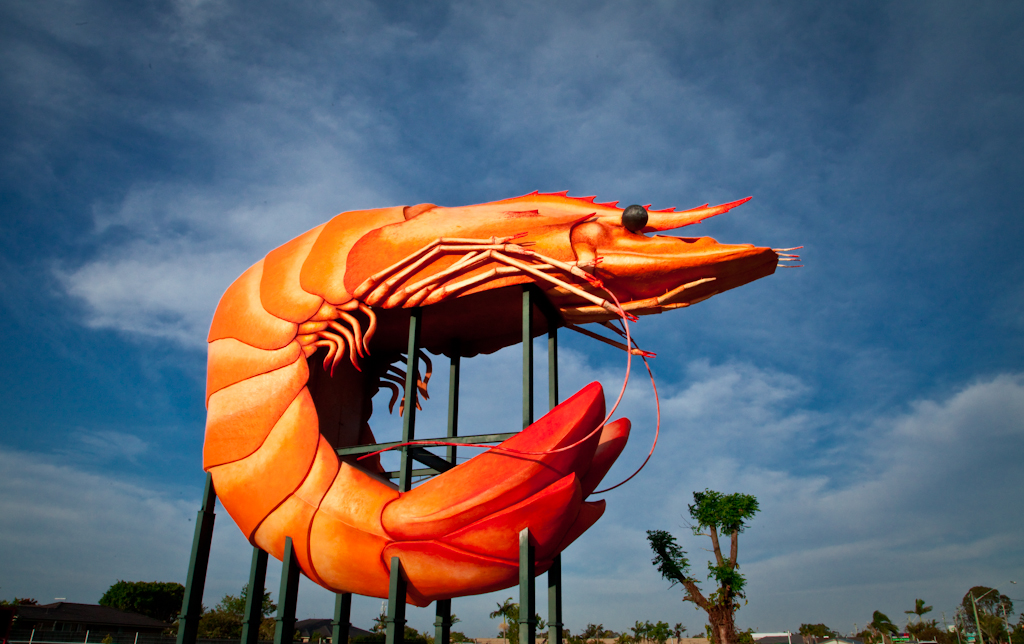
The Big Prawn in the Bunnings carpark after refurbishment, 2013

Ballina is home to the world's largest prawn model (made of concrete and fibreglass). On 24 September 2009, Ballina Shire Council voted to allow the demolition of the Big Prawn, but this permission was never acted upon. Bunnings purchased the site and refurbished the Prawn as part of the redevelopment. The Prawn now sits on a stand next to the entrance of the Bunnings Warehouse car park.

The Ballina Prawn festival ran from 2013–2017, featuring performances from Kav Temperley of Eskimo Joe, Simon Doe and Painted Dice, indie-rock band Hot Compost, and the late Howie Hughes singing his 'Prawn Song, For The Ballina Prawn Festival'.

In March 2018, Google Maps' facial recognition software blurred out the facial area of the Prawn, reported in the Sydney Morning Herald.

There is an ongoing "Prawn War" between the two Big Prawns with another being in Exmouth, Western Australia; the Big Prawn in Ballina is significantly larger but Exmouth locals say theirs is more realistic.

== Climate ==
The town of Ballina experiences a humid subtropical climate (Koppen Cfa), typical of the central part of Australia's eastern coast. Summers are sultry, humid and rainy, with approximately 40% of the town's total annual precipitation occurring from December to March, with March being the wettest month of the year, receiving an average of 225.4 mm (8.874 in) of precipitation. Ballina's annual precipitation total observes a considerably higher concentration in the first half of the year (January–June) than the second half of the year (July–December). Ballina's wetness is due to the town's coastal location and proximity to Cape Byron, the easternmost point in Australia, which means that exposure to moisture-laden frontal systems that develop throughout the year in the Tasman Sea follows accordingly. Ballina experiences a copious 1,764.7 mm (69.5 in) of precipitation annually, which is one of the highest annual precipitation levels to be found along the eastern coast of Australia south of the tropical coast of northern Queensland. The all-time highest and lowest temperatures ever recorded in the town are 42.0 °C (107.6 °F) and −2.0 °C (28.4 °F) on 12 January 2002 and 17 June 1999 respectively.

Climate data for Ballina Byron Gateway Airport (28º50'S, 153º34'E, 1 AMSL) (1992–2024 normals and extremes)
Month	Jan	Feb	Mar	Apr	May	Jun	Jul	Aug	Sep	Oct	Nov	Dec	Year
Record high °C (°F)	42.0 (107.6)	41.0 (105.8)	36.3 (97.3)	32.6 (90.7)	30.0 (86.0)	28.0 (82.4)	28.7 (83.7)	36.7 (98.1)	38.2 (100.8)	37.0 (98.6)	38.1 (100.6)	40.0 (104.0)	42.0 (107.6)
Mean daily maximum °C (°F)	28.4 (83.1)	28.1 (82.6)	27.1 (80.8)	25.0 (77.0)	22.5 (72.5)	20.4 (68.7)	20.1 (68.2)	21.4 (70.5)	23.6 (74.5)	24.9 (76.8)	26.3 (79.3)	27.6 (81.7)	24.6 (76.3)
Mean daily minimum °C (°F)	19.8 (67.6)	19.7 (67.5)	18.6 (65.5)	15.4 (59.7)	12.2 (54.0)	9.9 (49.8)	8.8 (47.8)	8.9 (48.0)	11.6 (52.9)	14.2 (57.6)	16.5 (61.7)	18.4 (65.1)	14.5 (58.1)
Record low °C (°F)	12.2 (54.0)	13.2 (55.8)	11.0 (51.8)	5.9 (42.6)	2.0 (35.6)	−2.0 (28.4)	0.0 (32.0)	1.0 (33.8)	0.4 (32.7)	4.2 (39.6)	7.0 (44.6)	9.3 (48.7)	−2.0 (28.4)
Average rainfall mm (inches)	170.6 (6.72)	223.6 (8.80)	225.4 (8.87)	182.2 (7.17)	158.0 (6.22)	188.8 (7.43)	107.4 (4.23)	75.3 (2.96)	68.1 (2.68)	107.1 (4.22)	117.5 (4.63)	144.0 (5.67)	1,764.7 (69.48)
Average rainy days (≥ 1.0 mm)	10.5	12.4	14.5	12.2	11.6	10.2	8.6	6.8	6.1	8.9	9.1	9.7	120.6
Average afternoon relative humidity (%)	67	68	67	65	64	62	59	55	59	62	65	64	63
Average dew point °C (°F)	19.7 (67.5)	19.9 (67.8)	18.5 (65.3)	16.1 (61.0)	13.4 (56.1)	11.0 (51.8)	9.9 (49.8)	9.9 (49.8)	12.5 (54.5)	14.7 (58.5)	16.8 (62.2)	18.3 (64.9)	15.1 (59.1)
Source: Bureau of Meteorology (1992–2024 normals and extremes)

== Media ==
Historically, the town was served by the R. R. Times (for "Richmond River") which ran from December 1890 to 1920, when it amalgamated with the North Coast Beacon.

The Northern Rivers Echo is a free weekly community newspaper with 27,000 copies distributed to Lismore, Alstonville, Wollongbar, Ballina, Casino, Nimbin and Evans Head. The Northern Star is a tabloid newspaper based in Lismore. It covers the region from Casino to Ballina and up to Murwillimbah and Byron Bay, covering a population of several hundred thousand.

Ballina receives TV channels from SBS and ABC and the regional owned and operated stations of Seven, Nine and 10 Northern NSW.

The commercial radio stations in the area are Triple Z (Hit Music) and 2LM 900 AM. Both are run by Broadcast Operations Group. The community radio station is Paradise FM 101.9. Other radio stations are Triple J 96.1 FM, ABC Radio National 96.9 FM, ABC Classic 95.3 and ABC North Coast 94.5 FM.

== Facilities ==
There are five primary schools in Ballina; Ballina Public School, Emmanuel Anglican College, Holy Family Catholic Primary School, Richmond Christian College, St. Francis Xavier Primary School and Southern Cross School. There are also four high schools in the town; Emmanuel Anglican College, Richmond Christian College, Ballina Coast High School and Xavier Catholic College.

There is also a hospital, the Ballina District Hospital, which is a rural community hospital and various aged care facilities.

== Transport ==
=== Ballina bypass ===
The Ballina bypass project upgraded 12.4 km of dual carriageway road, extending from south of Ballina at the intersection of the Bruxner and Pacific highways to north of Ballina at the intersection with Ross Lane at Tintenbar. Twelve kilometres of local roads were also upgraded.

Early works started in April 2008 and substantial works on 16 June 2008. The Cumbalum to Ross Lane section opened in 2011 (the bypass was extended an extra 0.5 km to allow for a better connection to the Tintenbar to Ewingsdale Project) with full completion in mid-2012. The project had its final traffic switch opened to the public in April 2012, allowing for separation of the Pacific Highway and the Bruxner Highway traffic.

=== Airport ===
Ballina Byron Gateway Airport is the region's main airport, located on Southern Cross Drive and 5 km (3 mi) from the Ballina CBD. It has links to Newcastle, Melbourne and Sydney with FlyPelican, Jetstar, Rex Airlines and Virgin Australia operating services. The airport is a 30-minute road trip to Byron Bay and 40 minutes to Lismore. In 2005 Ballina Airport was renamed the Ballina Byron Gateway airport in a bid to attract more people to the area.

In 2024 a $20.68 million upgrade was completed on the airport to further increase services.

== Sports ==
- The Ballina Seagulls is the local rugby league club that competes in the Northern Rivers Regional Rugby League competition.
- The Ballina Seahorses is the rugby union club that competes in the Far North Coast Rugby zone.
- The Ballina Soccer Club and Tintenbar East Ballina Football Club are the soccer clubs that competes in the Football Far North Coast competition
- The Ballina Bombers is the Australian rules football club that competes in the Queensland Football Association Division 2 South.
- There is also a cricket competition with clubs such as the Ballina Bears and Tintenbar-East Ballina competing at both the district and regional (LJ Hooker League) level.

== Notable people ==
- Ruth Drummond Ainsworth, artist
- Mitchell Aubusson, Sydney Roosters NRL player
- Simon Baker, actor
- Dustin Clare, actor
- Nathan Crosswell, basketball player
- Declan Curran, rugby union player
- Dustin Dollin, professional skateboarder
- Lute Drummond, operatic coach
- Gary Elkerton, surfer
- George Martin, mayor of Ballina
- Hunter Poon, cricketer
- Kerry Saxby-Junna, Saxby competed with the Ballina Athletic Club

== Twin cities ==
Ballina is twinned with:

- Ballina, County Mayo, Ireland
- Matamata-Piako District, Waikato, New Zealand

== Gallery ==
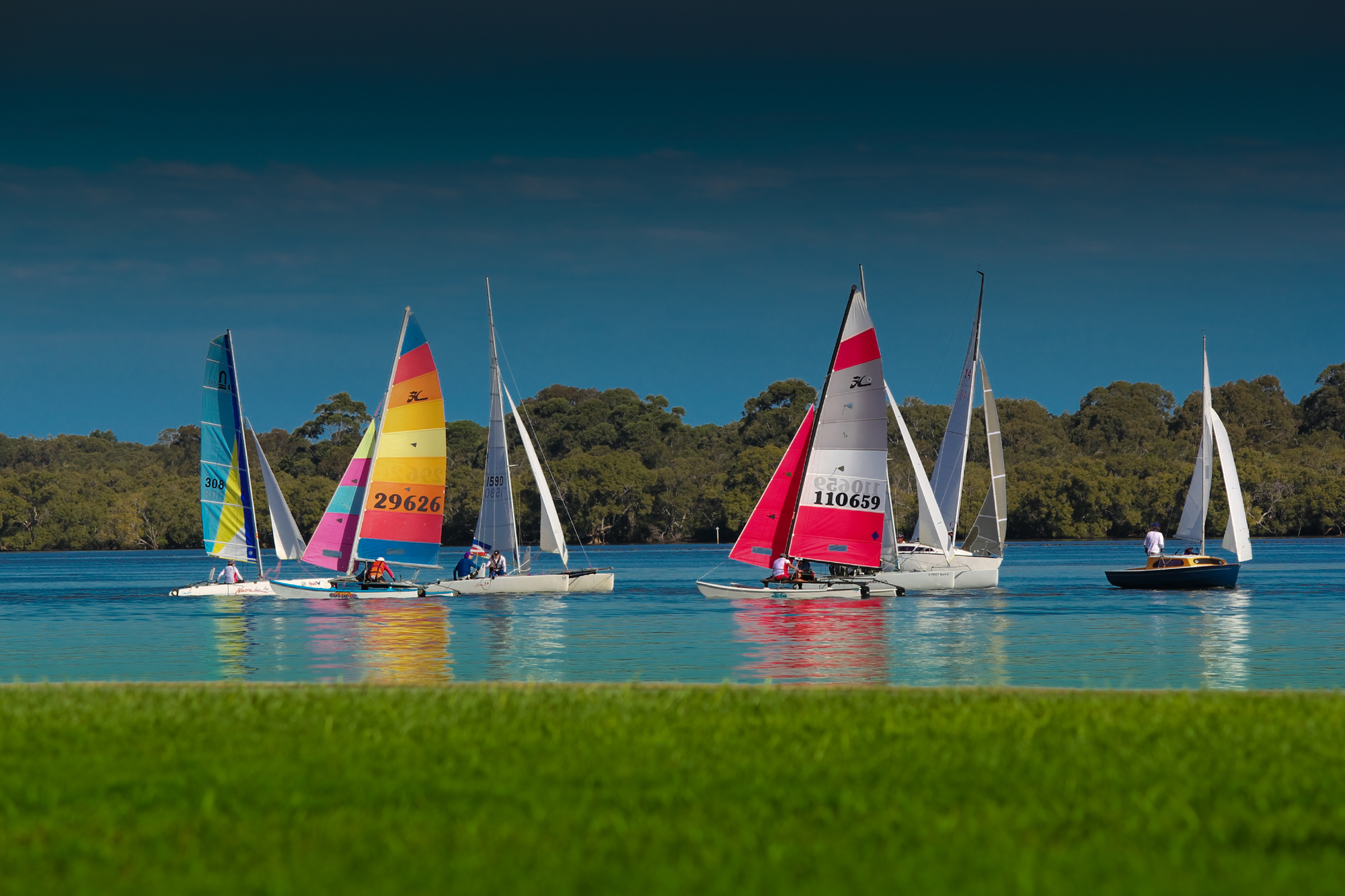
Boats on the Richmond River at Ballina

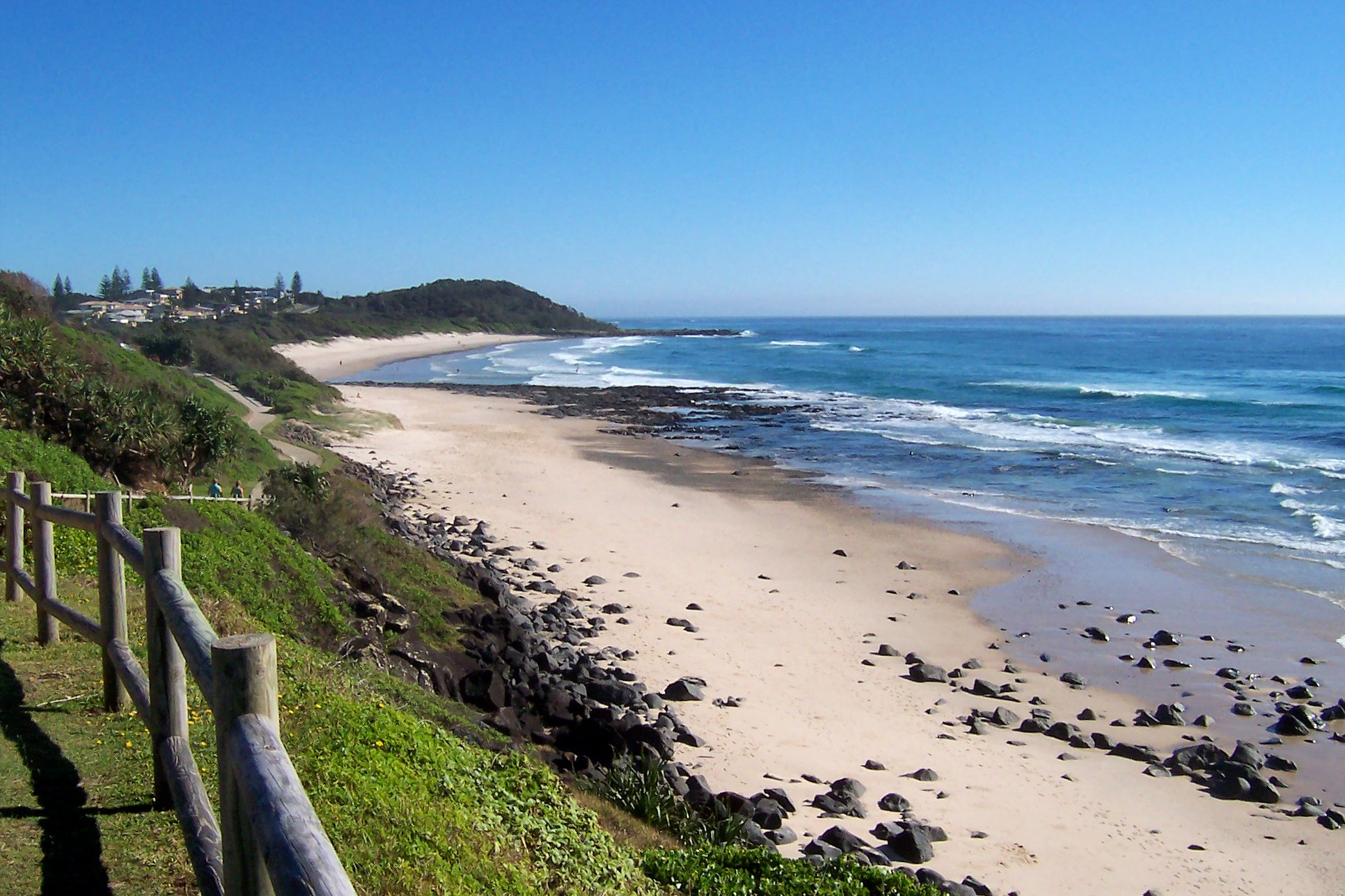
Ballina beaches

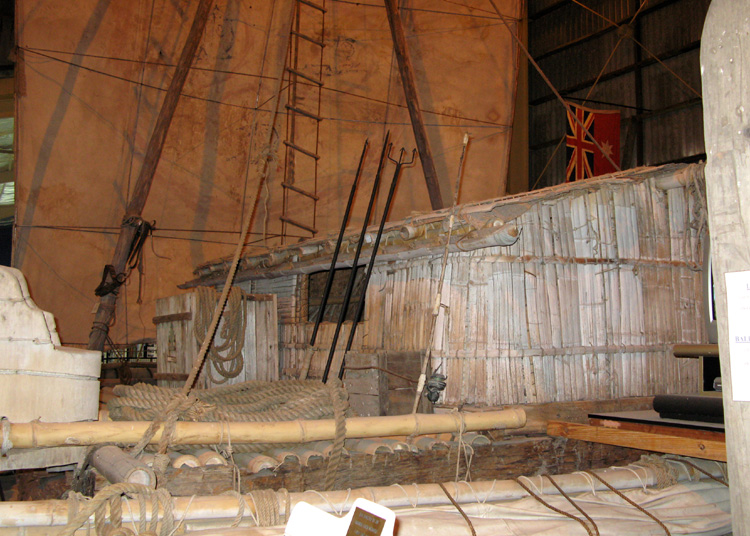
The Las Balsa raft at the Ballina Naval & Maritime Museum

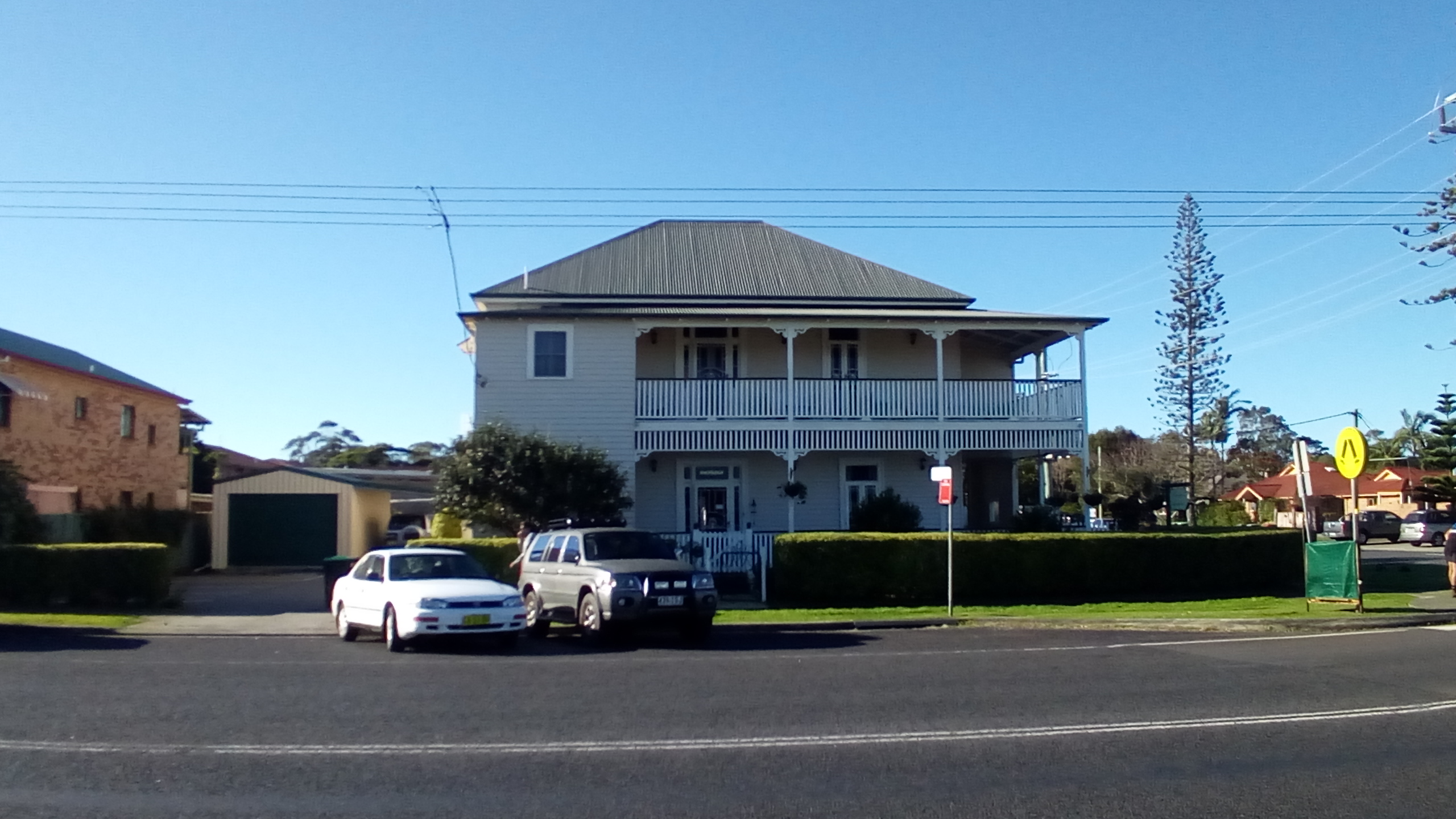
Riversleigh, Ballina

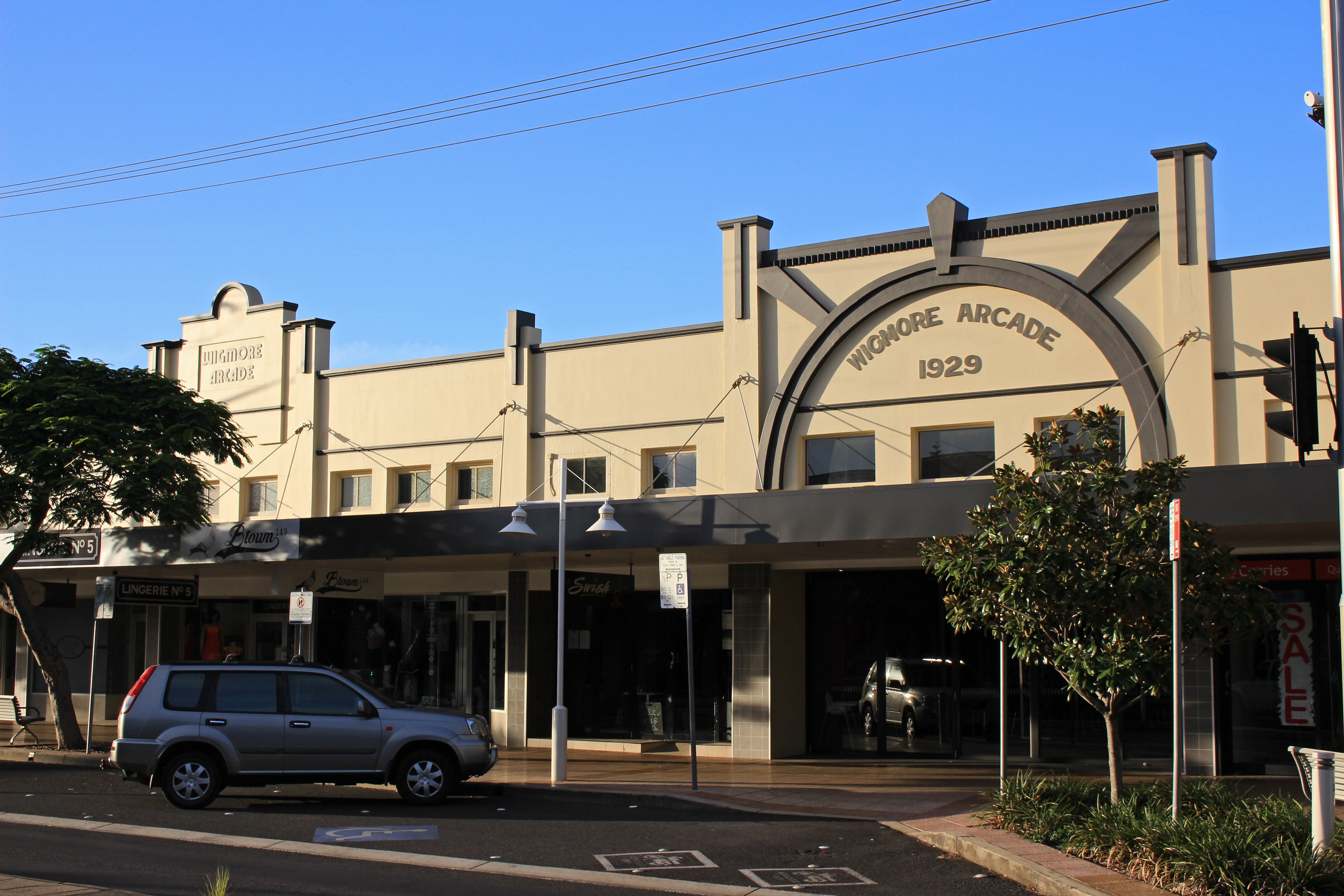
Wigmore Arcade

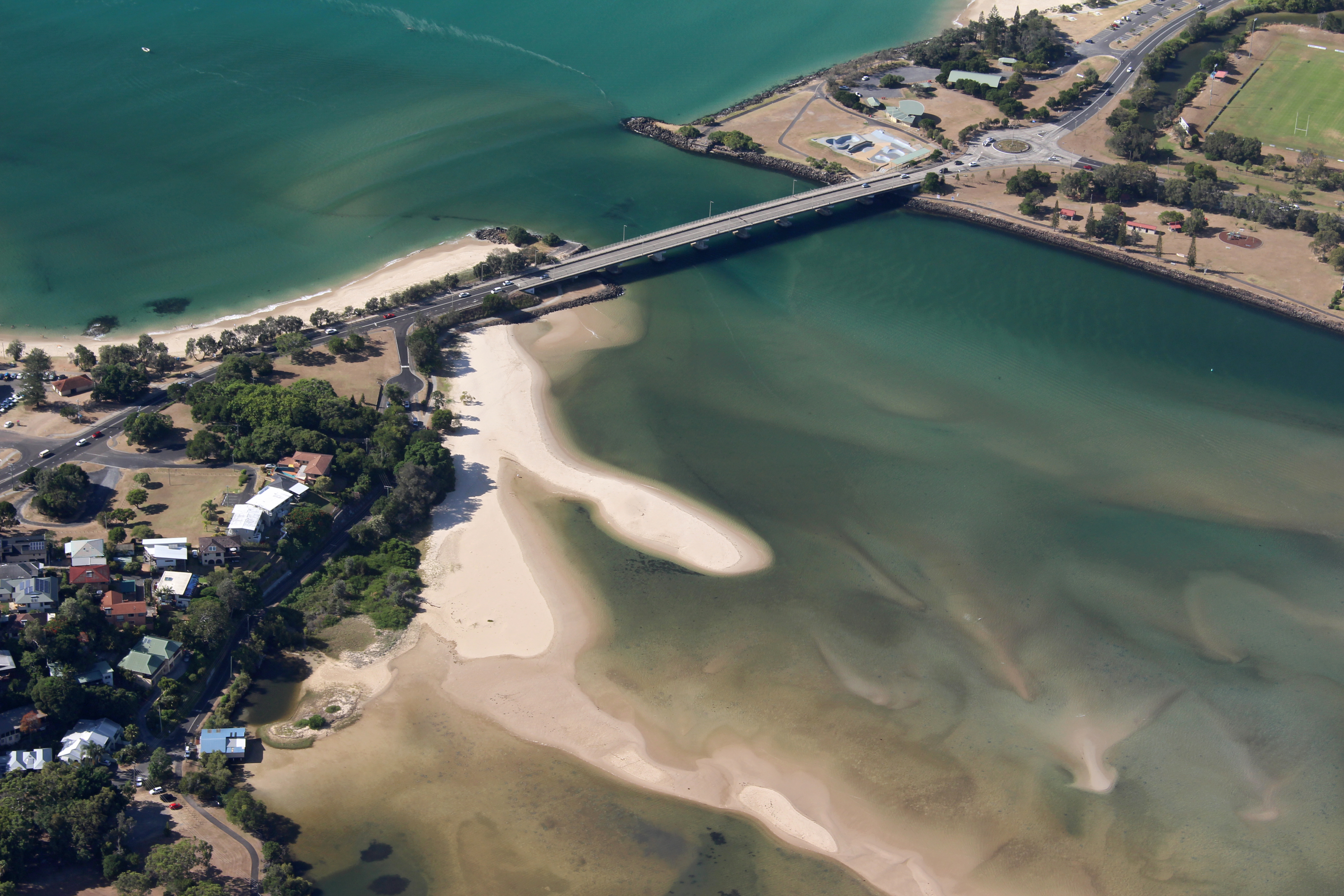
Missingham Bridge crossing North Creek from Ballina to East Ballina.

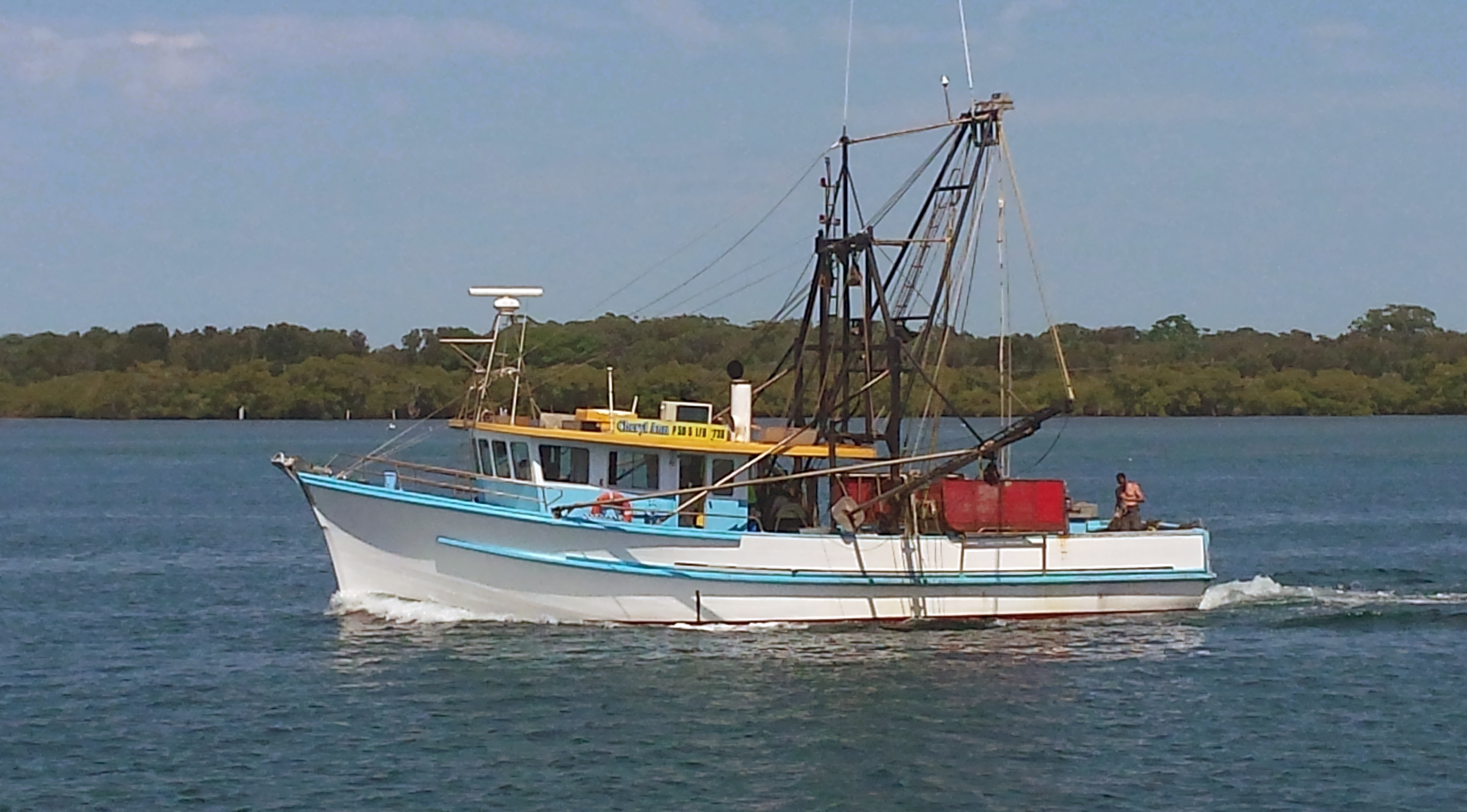
Richmond River Prawn Trawler

== See also ==
- MV Limerick (1925)
