= Cumbalum, New South Wales =

Cumbalum New South Wales
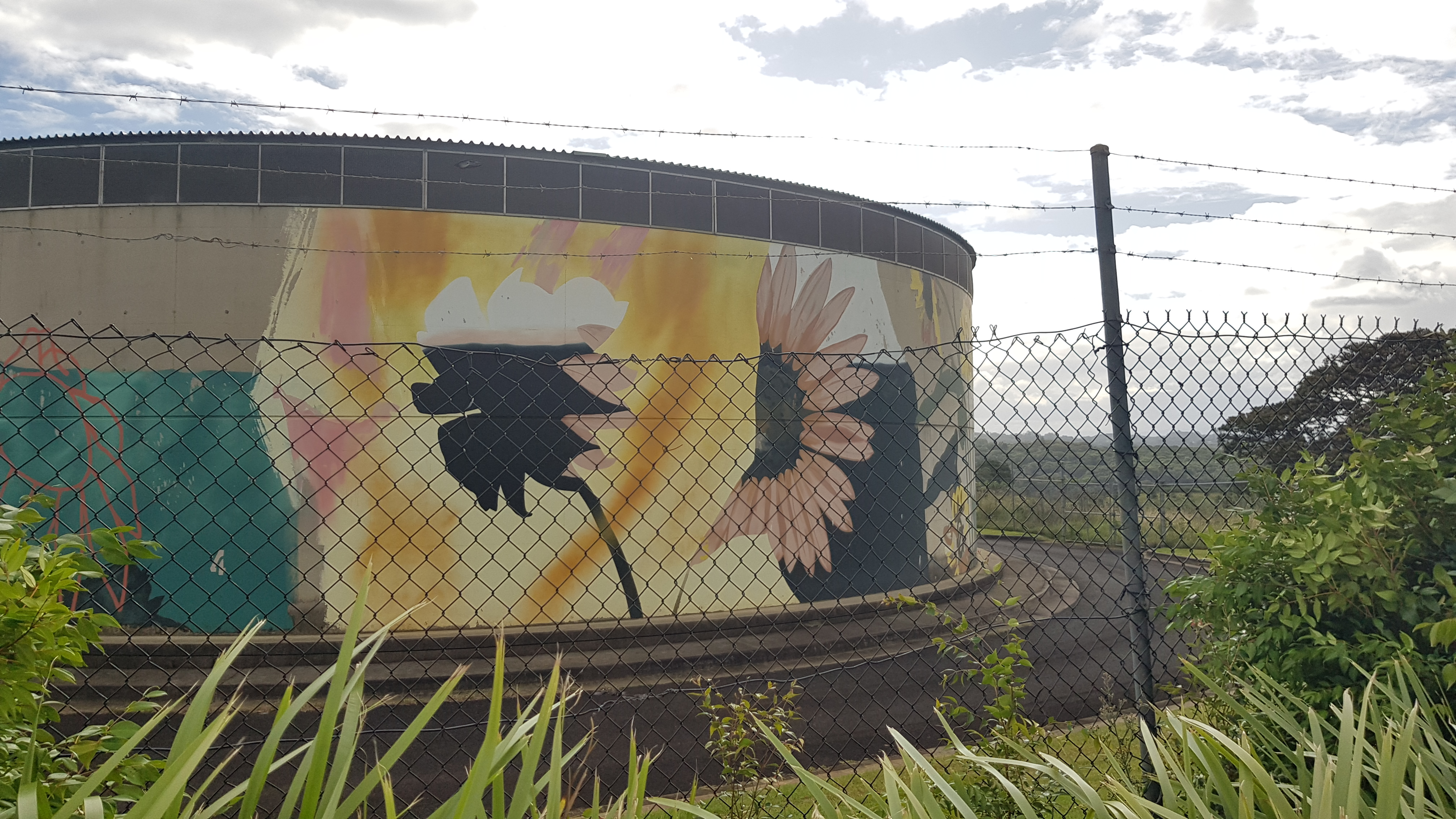
- Ballina Heights Drive, 2023

- Coordinates: 28°49′38″S 153°32′19″E
- Population: 2,211 (2021 census)
- Postcode(s): 2478
- LGA(s): Ballina Shire
- State electorate(s): Ballina
- Federal division(s): Richmond

Cumbalum is an estate located in the Ballina Shire of the Northern Rivers Region of New South Wales.

== Demographics ==
As of the 2021 Australian census, 3,230 people resided in North Ballina, up from 1,522 in the 2016 census. The median age of persons in North Ballina was 37 years. There were fewer males than females, with 47.8% of the population male and 52.2% female. The average household size was 2.2 people per household.
