= Cricket in New South Wales =

Sporting in an Australian state

Cricket has been played in New South Wales since the 19th century and is traditionally a very popular sport. It is also the most popular summer sport of the state.

The New South Wales Cricket Association is the state's cricket governing body.

The men's cricket team are the most successful Australian domestic team.

The women's cricket team, the Breakers, compete in the Women's National Cricket League one day competition.

NSW also has two Big Bash League teams, the Sydney Sixers and the Sydney Thunder, and two Women's Big Bash League teams (Sixers and Thunder).

== See also ==
- Cricket in Australia
- Cricket in Norfolk Island
- Cricket in Queensland
- Cricket in Victoria
- Cricket in Western Australia
