= Alstonville & District Cricket Club =

Cricket club in New South Wales, Australia

Alstonville and District Cricket Club
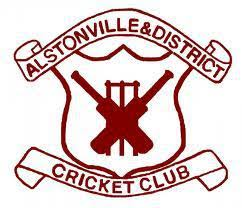
- Nickname: Red Soilers
- Sport: Cricket
- Founded: 1876
- League: LJ Hooker League
- Home ground: Hill Park, Wollongbar
- Colours

The Alstonville Cricket Club was founded in 1876.

With the establishment of the LJ Hooker League in 1994/95 the first-grade side now competes at a regional level, with the lower grades still playing in Ballina competition.

Alstonville have won the L J Hooker League on two occasions: 2001/02 and 2016/17.

== See also ==
- List of cricket clubs in Australia

== Sources ==
- Ensbey, Garry (2016). 140 years not out: history of cricket in Alstonville 1876-2016. Alstonville Plateau Historical Society. ISBN 9780987290496.
