= Phil Alley =

Australian cricketer (born 1970)

Personal information
- Full name: Phillip John Sydney Alley
- Born: 26 July 1970 (age 56); Orange, New South Wales, Australia
- Height: 2.08 m (6 ft 10 in)
- Batting: Right-handed
- Bowling: Left-arm fast

Domestic team information
- Years: Team
- 1989/90: South Australia
- 1990/91–1997/98: New South Wales

Career statistics
Competition	First-class	List A
Matches	31	8
Runs scored	449	19
Batting average	15.48	9.50
100s/50s	0/2	0/0
Top score	56	8*
Balls bowled	5,104	391
Wickets	90	9
Bowling average	30.10	28.22
5 wickets in innings	4	0
10 wickets in match	0	0
Best bowling	5/24	2/26
Catches/stumpings	20/–	1/–
- Source: CricketArchive, 21 April 2023

Phillip John Sydney Alley (born 26 July 1970) is an Australian former cricket player.

Alley was a left-arm fast bowler. Standing at 208 centimetres tall, he is believed to be Australia's tallest first-class cricketer. He played 31 first class cricket and eight List A cricket matches for New South Wales and South Australia between 1989 and 1998. He took his best first-class bowling figures of 5 for 24 in the Sheffield Shield final in March 1994, to help New South Wales to an innings victory.
