= Hot FM (Australian radio network) =

Former radio network in Australia

- Australia
- Broadcast area: Queensland and Western Australia

Programming
- Language: English
- Format: Contemporary hit radio
- Affiliations: Today Network

Ownership
- Owner: Southern Cross Austereo
- Sister stations: LocalWorks; RadioWest

History
- First air date: 1994

Links
- Website: hotfm.com.au/

Hot FM was a radio network broadcasting to Queensland and Western Australia. Owned and operated by Southern Cross Austereo, the stations broadcast a mix of local and networked programming. On 15 December 2016, the stations were merged into the Hit Network.

== History ==
The first Hot FM branded station was launched in Townsville by Rural Press in 1994. This was followed by successive launches in Mackay and Cairns, before a sale to DMG Regional Radio saw the brand expand throughout Queensland and into Western Australia.

In 2004, Hot FM and its heritage sister stations – including the RadioWest network in Western Australia – were sold to Macquarie Regional RadioWorks. In 2005, following DMG's purchase of an FM radio licence in Brisbane, Hot 91.1 Sunshine Coast was sold to A Investments, and later to Prime Media Group.

Under DMG's ownership, network stations broadcast a variety of local and networked programming, from network hubs based in Townsville, Bunbury, Albury and the Gold Coast. Following the merger of Southern Cross Media with Austereo in February 2011, the Hot FM network – along with regional counterparts Sea FM and Star FM – became more closely aligned with the Today Network, including networking programming from 2Day FM Sydney and Fox FM Melbourne.

On 15 December 2016, as part of a national brand consolidation by parent company Southern Cross Austereo, the stations were merged into the Hit Network.

== List of stations ==
As of 14 December 2016, the Hot FM network comprised eight stations:

- Hot FM Cairns
- Hot FM Central Queensland
- Hot FM Charters Towers (Owned & operated by Resonate Broadcasting)
- Hot FM Mackay
- Hot FM Mount Isa
- Hot FM Queensland
- Hot FM Townsville
- Hot FM Western Australia
