= Hit Western Australia =

hit Western Australia
- Regional Western Australia; Australia

Programming
- Format: Contemporary hit radio
- Affiliations: Hit Network

Ownership
- Owner: Southern Cross Austereo
- Sister stations: Triple M

Links
- Website: hit.com.au/

Hit is an Australian commercial radio station broadcasting to regional areas of Western Australia. Owned and operated by Southern Cross Austereo, the station broadcasts a contemporary hit radio music format with a breakfast show broadcast from studios in Perth.

== History ==
The stations were established between 1997 and 1999, under the Hot FM brand first used in Queensland. In 2004, Hot FM and sister stations RadioWest were sold to Macquarie Regional RadioWorks.

Under the ownership of DMG Regional Radio, network stations broadcast a variety of local and networked programming, from network hubs based in Bunbury, Albury and the Gold Coast. Following the merger of Southern Cross Media with Austereo in February 2011, the Hot FM network – along with Sea FM and Star FM regional counterparts – became more closely aligned with the Today Network, including networking programming from 2Day FM in Sydney and Fox FM in Melbourne.

On 15 December 2016, as part of a national brand consolidation by parent company Southern Cross Austereo, the station was merged into the Hit Network.

In 2020, Southern Cross Austereo purchased Red Wave Media from Seven West Media. On 16 March 2020, the Red FM branded frequencies changed its branding to become part of the Hit Network.

Up until December 2024, there was a dedicated regional breakfast show for the regional Hit stations. Since January 2025, the Mix 94.5 breakfast show has been broadcast throughout the state.

== Transmitters ==
Hit Western Australia is broadcast via nine full power stations.

Call sign	Frequency	Broadcast area	ERP W	Transmitter coordinates	Notes
6AAY	95.3 FM	Albany	50,000	34°39′21″S 117°38′51″E	Locally branded as hit95.3 Albany
6BET	100.5 FM	Bridgetown	5,000	34°3′18″S 116°10′37″E	Locally branded as hit Southwest
6BUN	95.7 FM	Bunbury	55,000	33°23′49″S 115°54′55″E	Locally branded as hit95.7 Southwest
6KAN	94.9 FM	Katanning	5,000	33°38′58″S 117°30′2″E	Locally branded as hit94.9 Great Southern
6KAR	97.9 FM	Kalgoorlie	6,000	30°44′8″S 121°30′4″E	Locally branded as hit97.9 Kalgoorlie
6MER	105.1 FM	Merredin	6,000	31°30′12″S 118°12′21″E	Locally branded as hit Wheatbelt
6NAM	96.5 FM	Northam	10,000	31°40′30″S 116°36′41″E	Locally branded as hit Wheatbelt
6NAN	100.5 FM	Narrogin	5,000	32°57′38″S 117°12′58″E	Locally branded as hit100.5 Great Southern
6SEA	102.3 FM	Esperance	5,000	33°52′30″S 121°53′41″E	Locally branded as hit102.3 Esperance
6FMS	106.5 FM	Karratha	-	-	Locally branded as hit106.5 Karratha
6HED	101.3 FM	Broome	-	-	Locally branded as hit101.3 Broome
6HED	91.7 FM	Port Hedland	-	-	Locally branded as hit91.7 Port Hedland
6GGG	96.5 FM	Geraldton	-	-	Locally branded as hit96.5 Geraldton
6CAR	99.7 FM	Carnarvon	-	-	Locally branded as hit99.7 Carnarvon

In addition, the 13 full-power stations feed a further 17 repeater stations.

Frequency	Broadcast area	ERP W	Transmitter coordinates	Notes
106.5 FM	Albany	100	35°1′4″S 117°52′15″E	Infill repeater
94.1 FM	Beacon	100	30°27′41″S 117°53′35″E	
94.9 FM	Boddington	50	32°47′23″S 116°28′31″E	
95.3 FM	Boddington	10	32°57′57″S 116°26′58″E	Infill repeater for the Boddington bauxite mine
96.7 FM	Boddington	50	32°45′9″S 116°20′39″E	Infill repeater for the Boddington gold mine
96.7 FM	Collie	80	33°22′10″S 116°11′37″E	
91.9 FM	Kalgoorlie	10	30°46′52″S 121°30′46″E	Infill repeater for the Super Pit gold mine
94.7 FM	Kambalda	20	31°12′40″S 121°40′24″E	
102.3 FM	Koorda	200	30°49′34″S 117°29′4″E	
95.1 FM	Kulin	40	32°40′19″S 118°9′15″E	
100.3 FM	Margaret River	25	33°57′3″S 115°4′37″E	
90.7 FM	Mukinbudin	100	30°54′45″S 118°12′13″E	
102.1 FM	Nannup	10	33°58′54″S 115°45′38″E	
97.3 FM	Pemberton	50	34°27′39″S 116°0′41″E	
89.1 FM	Ravensthorpe	250	33°34′52″S 120°2′48″E	
102.3 FM	Southern Cross	250	31°14′3″S 119°19′27″E	
104.7 FM	Wongan Hills	30	30°53′26″S 116°43′29″E	

== Frequencies ==
Mix94.5

Frequency	Local name	Location
94.5	Mix94.5	Perth
DAB+	Mix94.5	Perth

Hit Albany

Frequency	Local name	Location
95.3	hit95.3	Albany
106.5	hit95.3	Albany

Hit Broome

Frequency	Local name	Location
101.3	hit101.3	Broome

Hit Carnarvon

Frequency	Local name	Location
99.7	Hit99.7	Carnarvon

Hit Esperance

Frequency	Local name	Location
102.5	hit102.5	Esperance
89.1	unknown	Ravensthorpe*

Hit Goldfields

Frequency	Local name	Location
97.9	hit97.9	Kalgoorlie
91.9	unknown	Kalgoorlie (Super Pit gold mine)

Hit Great Southern

Frequency	Local name	Location
100.5	hit100.5	Narrogin
94.9	hit94.9	Katanning

Hit Geraldton

Frequency	Local name	Location
96.5	hit96.5	Geraldton

Hit Karratha

Frequency	Local name	Location
106.5	hit106.5	Karratha

Hit Port Hedland

Frequency	Local name	Location
91.7	hit91.7	Port Hedland

Hit Southwest

Frequency	Local name	Location
95.7	hit95.7	Bunbury Busselton
96.7	unknown	Collie
100.3	hit100.3	Margaret River
102.1	unknown	Nannup
97.3	unknown	Pemberton
100.5	hit fm	Bridgetown Manjimup

Hit Wheatbelt

Frequency	Local name	Location
105.1	hit105.1	Merredin
96.5	hit96.5	Northam
104.7	unknown	Wongan Hills
102.3	unknown	Southern Cross
95.1	unknown	Kulin
94.1	unknown	Beacon
102.3	unknown	Koorda
90.7	unknown	Mukinbudin
94.9	94.9	Boddington
95.3	unknown	Boddington (Boddington bauxite mine)
96.7	unknown	Boddington (Boddington gold mine)

Hit WA

Frequency	Local name	Location
102.7	102.7	Argyle
103.9	103.9	Barrow Island
103.5	103.5	Bremer Bay
101.3	101.3	Brockman 2 mine – Pit 8
102.1	102.1	Brockman 4 mine
91.7	91.7	Cape Lambert
101.5	101.5	Cervantes
105.7	105.7	Channar mine
90.9	90.9	Christmas Creek mine
98.9	Unknown	Drumsite, Christmas Island
90.9	Unknown	Christmas Island Phosphate Hill
106.9	Unknown	Christmas Island Rocky Point
105.1	105.1	Cloudbreak mine
97.1	97.1	Cloudbreak mine 1
97.9	97.9	Cloudbreak mine 2
100.5	Unknown	Cocos Islands (West Island)
101.9	101.9	Coorow
102.9	102.9	Cue
106.1	106.1	Dalwallinu
101.9	101.9	Darlot
102.9	102.9	DeGrussa mine
102.7	102.7	Derby
106.9	106.9	Ellendale
102.1	102.1	Eneabba
102.9	102.9	Exmouth
102.5	102.5	Extension Hill mine
102.9	102.9	Fitzroy Crossing
102.1	102.1	Fortnum mine
103.3	103.3	Garden Well mine
107.9	107.9	Golden Grove
102.1	102.1	Green Head
102.9	102.9	Halls Creek
102.9	102.9	Hope Downs 1 mine
95.9	95.9	Hope Downs 4 mine
91.7	91.7	Hope Downs Village
103.7	103.7	Hopetoun
94.3	94.3	Jack Hills mine
90.9	90.9	Jimblebar mine
105.7	105.7	Jundee
103.1	103.1	Jurien Bay
102.9	102.9	Kalbarri
102.1	102.1	Karara mine
91.3	91.3	Koodaideri mine
107.5	107.5	Koolyanobbing
102.5	102.5	Kununurra
106.9	106.9	Lake Gregory
102.3	102.3	Lancelin
102.1	102.1	Laverton
102.5	102.5	Leeman
102.9	102.9	Leinster
101.7	101.7	Leonora
102.9	102.9	Marandoo
102.1	102.1	Marandoo mine
102.7	102.7	Marble Bar
103.1	103.1	Meekatharra
96.9	96.9	Mesa A mine
94.1	94.1	Mesa J mine
90.9	90.9	Moora
103.1	103.1	Morawa
107.3	107.3	Mount Jackson
97.7	97.7	Mount Keith
102.9	102.9	Mount Keith Mine
102.5	102.5	Mount Magnet
94.5	94.5	Mount Welcome
104.1	104.1	Mount Whaleback mine
94.1	94.1	Murrin Murrin
102.5	102.5	Murrin Murrin Mine
94.5	94.5	Nammuldi mine
88.9	88.9	Newman
106.5	106.5	Newman Area C mine
102.7	102.7	Northcliffe
103.1	103.1	Nullagine
102.9	102.9	Pannawonica
101.3	101.3	Paraburdoo mine
100.1	100.1	Perenjori
105.9	105.9	Plutonic Gold Mine
95.3	95.3	Roebourne
102.9	102.9	Roy Hill mine
105.3	105.3	Savannah Mine
104.7	104.7	Sandstone
102.7	102.7	Solomin Mining Area 1
96.3	96.3	Solomon Mining Area 2
97.7	97.7	Tanami Mines Site 2
106.9	106.9	Telfer
93.3	93.3	Telfer mine West Dome
101.1	101.1	Three Springs
103.7	103.7	Ti Tree
102.9	102.9	Tjirrkarli
105.7	105.7	Tom Price
103.3	103.3	Mount Tom Price mine
107.7	107.7	Tropicana Gold Mine
102.9	102.9	Walpole
102.1	102.1	Warburton
95.7	95.7	West Angelas
88.3	88.3	West Angelas mine Dep B, WA
102.9	102.9	West Angelas mine Dep E, WA
88.9	88.9	Western Turner Syncline Mine, WA
96.3	96.3	Western Turner Syncline Mine 2, WA
102.9	102.9	Windarling
102.1	102.1	Wodgina
92.5	92.5	Woodie Woodie
102.9	102.9	Wyndham
104.5	104.5	Yalgoo
98.7	98.7	Yandi mine Site 1
94.7	94.7	Yandi mine Site 2
89.1	89.1	Yandi Junction SW Mine
105.7	105.7	Yandicoogina mine
99.3	99.3	Yandicoogina Village
102.9	102.9	Yiyili

* Station might be in wrong place
