= Hit South Queensland =

Commercial radio station in Queensland, Australia

hit South Queensland
- Australia
- Broadcast area: South West Queensland and the Darling Downs

Programming
- Format: Contemporary hit radio
- Affiliations: Hit Network

Ownership
- Owner: Southern Cross Austereo
- Sister stations: Triple M Darling Downs

History
- First air date: 2000

Links
- Website: hit.com.au/darlingdowns

hit South Queensland is an Australian commercial radio station broadcasting to Southwest Queensland and the Darling Downs. Owned and operated by Southern Cross Austereo, the station broadcasts a contemporary hit radio music format with a local breakfast show based from studios in Toowoomba. Programming from Hit South Queensland is retransmitted in Charleville through 101.7 FM WEST FM (operated through Resonate Broadcasting)

== History ==
The station was first launched in 2000 by RG Capital as C FM, affiliated with the Sea FM brand used by its sister stations on the Queensland coast. In 2004, C FM and sister station 4GR was sold to Macquarie Regional RadioWorks.

Following the merger of Southern Cross Media, Macquarie Regional RadioWorks' successor, with Austereo in February 2011, the Sea FM network - along with Hot FM and Star FM regional counterparts - became more closely aligned with the Today Network, including networking programming from 2DayFM Sydney and Fox FM Melbourne.

On 13 November 2013, C FM relaunched as Hot FM. As Hot FM, 4RGD performed well in a ratings survey conducted by Xtra Research in June 2016, winning an average of 31% audience share in all 10+ demographics. According to the survey results, the station also won all but two individual age demographics. The station was beaten in the older 55-64 and 65+ demographics by ABC Southern Queensland.

On 15 December 2016, as part of a national brand consolidation by parent company Southern Cross Austereo, the station was merged into the Hit Network.

== Transmitters ==
Hit South Queensland is broadcast via 3 full power stations.

Call sign	Frequency	Broadcast area	ERP W	Transmitter coordinates	Notes
4KRY	89.1 FM	Kingaroy, Queensland	15,000	26°36′1″S 151°52′7″E	Locally branded as hit89.1 South Burnett
4RGD	100.7 FM	Toowoomba, Queensland	10,000	27°30′22″S 151°57′23″E	Locally branded as hit100.7 Darling Downs
4ROM	95.1 FM	Roma, Queensland	1,000	26°34′28″S 148°50′53″E	Locally branded as hit95.1 Maranoa

In addition, the 3 full power stations feed a further 6 repeater stations (including 101.7 FM which is owned and operated by Resonate Broadcasting as WEST FM Charleville).

Frequency	Broadcast area	ERP W	Transmitter coordinates	Notes
97.5 FM	Dalby, Queensland	600	27°4′10″S 151°16′10″E	
102.9 FM	St George, Queensland	100	28°2′15″S 148°34′53″E	
97.9 FM	Stanthorpe, Queensland	100	28°39′13″S 151°56′49″E	
97.3 FM	Tarong, Queensland	50	26°48′9″S 151°54′56″E	Infill repeater for the Tarong coal mine
91.9 FM	Warwick, Queensland	2,000	28°9′37″S 152°2′5″E	
101.7 FM	Charleville, Queensland	2,000	26°24′16″S 146°14′40″E	Repeater of hit95.1 Maranoa - Operated by Resonate Broadcasting as WEST FM Charleville

== On Air Schedule ==
=== Weekdays ===
6:00am–9:00am: Bronte & Lakey

9:00am–12:00pm: Em

12:00pm–3:00pm: Pez

3:00pm–6:00pm: Carrie & Tommy

6:00pm–7:00pm: Jimmy, Nath & Emma's Happy Hour

7:00pm–10:00pm: The Hot Hits with Nic & Loren (Mon-Thurs)

7:00pm–10:00pm: Lucy & Nikki (Friday)

=== Weekends ===
8:00am–10:00am: Lucy & Nikki

5:00pm–7:00pm: The Hot Hits with Nic & Loren (Saturday)

7:00pm–12:00am: The Saturday Night Party Playlist

6:00pm–8:00pm: The Pulse with Seany B (Sunday)
