= Alo Baker =

Australian television and radio presenter

Alo Baker is an Australian television and radio presenter.

Baker is best known for his Foxtel show Aussie Dreamlivers with two seasons also shown on Australia's Seven network subsidiary channel 7mate and for his radio work with Southern Cross Austereo, where he presented a national workday program on the Hit Network.

He has been a finalist at the Australian Commercial Radio Awards on six occasions and has won twice.
