= Continuous Call Team =

Australian radio sports program

The Continuous Call Team is an Australian radio sports program, covering the news and live games of the National Rugby League. It is produced and broadcast by 2GB Sydney, and is relayed to stations in New South Wales, the ACT, Queensland, Victoria, Western Australia and Papua New Guinea. The team have exclusive commercial radio rights to the National Rugby League (apart from Thursday Night matches) until the end of the games are broadcast on Friday nights, Saturdays and Sundays, with a talkback/humour programme broadcast on Saturday and Sunday afternoons.

== Team members ==
=== Current team members ===
- Ray Hadley (football commentator, and 2GB's morning show presenter).
- Darryl "The Big Marn" Brohman (ex-Canterbury-Bankstown Bulldogs and Penrith player, Queensland State of Origin representative, Australian Tug of War representative, football commentator and Nine Network presenter)
- Chris Warren (Play By Play Caller on Saturday Night and fill-in sideline eye, former player for Western Suburbs and Western Reds. Son of legendary football commentator Ray Warren )
- Jamie Soward former rugby league premiership winning player for St. George, Soward also played for Penrith, the Sydney Roosters and the London Broncos
- Mark Levy (Friday and Saturday night Commentator)
- Mark 'Piggy' Riddell (fill-in sideline-eye, former player for Sydney Roosters, St. George Illawarra Dragons, Parramatta and Wigan Warriors.
- David Riccio, Award-winning reporter who works for Sydney's Daily Telegraph. Riccio works mainly as a sideline commentator and reporter during 2GB games on a Friday and Saturday night.

=== Former team members ===
- In 2004, Peter "Chippy" Frilingos, who was a member of the team, and chief rugby league writer for The Daily Telegraph, died of a heart attack while working for the Telegraph. His spot was not filled for the remainder of the 2004 NRL season. A replacement was found in former rival, and ex-2UE commentator Darryl Brohman.
- Bob "Bozo" Fulton (analyst, Australian and New South Wales selector, Manly and Eastern Suburbs player, former Australian International and New South Wales representative, former Australian coach, former two time Manly premiership coach and Eastern Suburbs coach, representative in 60's and 70's team of the decade). He died in 2021.
- David Morrow (commentator) Former chief rugby league caller for ABC Grandstand Morrow came out of retirement to join 2GB for the 2015 season replacing Andrew Moore who had crossed to the ABC. He died in 2024.
- Steve "Blocker" Roach (football commentator, and former Balmain player, Australian International and New South Wales State of Origin representative). Roach was sacked by 2GB in August 2014 for his involvement in a bullying incident with a 2GB staffer.
- Anthony Griffin former Penrith and Brisbane head coach who was also head coach of St. George.
- Tony "Magoo" Megahey (sideline commentator, and rugby league writer)
- John Gibbs
- Peter Jackson
- Andrew Voss
- Don Moseley nicknamed "The Velvet Fog" (Around the Grounds reporter)
- Wayne Pearce
- Ray Price
- Laurie Daley
- Greg Alexander
- Paul Sironen
- Dean "Bulldog" Ritchie
- John Redman (Saturday night sideline-eye)
- Andrew Moore (football commentator, and substitute for Hadley) Moore left 2GB at the end of the 2014 season to work for the ABC Grandstand Rugby League team, after a dispute with Hadley over the number of games rostered each week.
- Erin Molan
- Joel Caine (former St George, Balmain, Wests Tigers, London Broncos and Salford player, 'Around the Grounds' reporter and Saturday night commentator).

== Coverage ==
Since 2006, the show's national reach has declined, with groups such as Broadcast Operations Group (BOG), Southern Cross Austereo (SCA), Grant Broadcasters (now ARN) and Capital Radio Network dropping 2GB's coverage for programs from either SCA's Triple M, 2SM or SEN, or in the case of Grant/ARN, dropping networked sports coverage entirely for cheaper local sport programs mixed with music.

This means that listeners in some areas, mainly in areas with stations owned by BOG or ARN, must either rely on coverage on ABC Grandstand or stream the program online. Stations that picked up coverage in 2008 and 2009, such as Gosford's Star FM, along with stations in Northern Queensland and the Northern Territory have since dropped the program.

As of March 2023, only Nine-owned 2GB and 4BC take the program in its entirety, along with stations in Canberra, Lithgow, Perth, parts of regional Queensland and Paupa New Guinea taking portions of the program.

=== Network stations ===
as of March 11, 2023

==== New South Wales ====
- Sydney – 2GB
- Lithgow – 2LT

==== Australian Capital Territory ====
- Canberra – 2CC and Mix 106.3

==== Queensland ====
- Brisbane – 4BC
- Kingaroy – 4SB
- Charters Towers – 4GC
- Emerald – 4HI
- Charleville – 4VL
- Mount Isa – 4LM
- Roma – 4ZR
- Various areas in Queensland - KIX Country

==== Sport FM Perth ====
- Perth – 91.3 SportFM

==== Papua New Guinea ====
- Port Moresby – FM 100

== Format ==
=== Fridays ===
The Continuous Call Team broadcasts Friday Night Football from 7.00pm (with the kick-off at 7.30pm) until 9.45pm. David Morrow calls the selected scheduled game that's on the Nine Network in Sydney with Darryl Brohman and Mark Riddell on the sidelines.

=== Saturdays ===
Between 12pm and 5pm, the programme is broadcast from the 2GB studio in Pyrmont with Mark Levy, Brohman, Mark Riddell, and David Morrow. The program consists of reviews of the previous night's match, short reports on the night's upcoming match, combined with large amounts of comedy, including stories of the team member's private lives, humorous songs about the team members and issues in rugby league, as well as discussion on unrelated issues. However, much of the program is focused on the open line calls of the program's listeners.

From 5pm – 7:30pm the program moves to a live broadcast from either the ground or the 2GB 873 Interactive Studio, depending on where the game it located. The program is hosted by Mark Levy, with David Morrow, Riddell and Brohman.

As of 2012, 2GB hosts a live broadcast of the 7:30pm NRL game with Mark Levy and Chris Warren as commentators. After the game, there are player interviews plus the broadcast team analyse the night's games with callers and emailers.

=== Sundays ===
The programme airs from 12 Noon- 6pm and is broadcast live from the ground of a selected Sunday match. Progress scores from other matches are provided by reporters live at those grounds. The team review the Saturday night match, and discuss the upcoming matches for that day. There is less of a focus on comedy on Sundays, however it is still evident. From 2pm or 3pm, Mark Levy with Mark Riddell and Darryl Brohman broadcast the selected match. After the game, players and coaches are interviewed, listeners give their opinions on the day's matches, and the premiership ladder is updated.

== History ==
The program began in 1987 when Ray Hadley and Ray Price took over the commentary duties on 2UE. When 2UE lost the rights to broadcast NRL games in 1999 to 2GB, the station asked commentator Ray Hadley to present a six-hour rugby league program, without having the rights to the actual games, nor having access to their reporters inside the ground. Several 2UE commentators, including John Gibbs and Darryl Brohman, joined 2GB.

The program was renamed The Talking League Team. The team consisting of Ray Hadley, Peter Frilingos, Bob Fulton, Steve Roach, Tony Megahey and Greg Alexander astounded industry insiders when they beat 2GB and ABC Radio, both of whom had the actual rights to NRL games in 2000 and 2001. Many network stations dropped 2GB coverage and switched to 2UE's coverage. At one stage, rival 2GB campaigned for Foxtel to cut off 2UE's access to the service, as they were calling games off their coverage. The team stopped the practice soon after the threat was made.

In 2002, when Ray Hadley moved to 2GB, he brought his team over with him (with the exception of Alexander) to bring their coverage of live NRL games, and continued to win the ratings since then.

In 2004, the team lost longtime member Peter Frilingos to a heart attack, and his spot was not filled for the rest of the season, to be eventually replaced by Darryl Brohman in 2005.

In 2011, Hadley gave up commentating games with Moore calling all three weekend games.

In 2012, Hadley would take over commentating Nine Network's second Friday night game.

== Songs ==
Throughout the history of The Continuous Call Team, music has been an integral part of the program with send ups of popular songs of any era and genre. Lyrically, these songs have been directed at anyone or anything related to rugby league (be it referees, clubs, players, coaches and the like). The songs are written and many are also performed by The Robertson Brothers who are exclusively commissioned by and to The Continuous Call Team, as well as other aspiring performers.

== CCT TV ==
In 2008, a 30-minute program known as CCT TV – Weekend Detention, featuring video of the team in the studio of a Saturday afternoon was produced for the RugbyLeagueLive.com website.
