= Tapt Media =

Australian media company founded 1938

- Formerly: Macquarie Broadcasting Service (1938–2015); Macquarie Media (2015–20); Nine Radio (2020–26)
- Type: Private
- Industry: Broadcast radio
- Founded: 1938; 88 years ago
- Headquarters: Australia
- Owner: Laundy family
- Subsidiaries: 2GB; 3AW; 4BC; 6PR
- Website: taptmedia.com.au

Tapt Media (formerly Nine Radio and Macquarie Media Limited) is an Australian media company, owned by the Laundy family. The company operates radio stations nationally in the capital cities of Sydney, Melbourne, Brisbane and Perth, as well as regional Queensland.

== History ==
The company was formerly a publicly listed company and originally founded in 1938 as the Macquarie Broadcasting Service, adopting the name "Macquarie Media" after being acquired by Fairfax Media in 2015.

=== Origins ===
2GB, one of Sydney's premier commercial radio stations, was founded by Theosophical Broadcasting Station Pty Ltd. in 1926, a division of Theosophical Society Adyar. In January 1936, in the depths of the Great Depression, 2GB and 2UE formed an alliance, Broadcasting Service Association (BSA), to share production facilities for producing radio drama and other locally produced entertainment, which was hugely popular and in better times highly lucrative. The BSA was under joint management of Alfred Edward Bennett and Cecil Vincent Stevenson, managing directors of 2GB and 2UE respectively. That same year, the controlling interest in 2GB was purchased by Denison Estates Ltd. A new board of directors was appointed under chairman Hugh Denison and included A. E. Bennett, who continued as station manager, and Frederick Daniell.

In early February 1937 A. E. Bennett hosted a peak conference of commercial radio interests of New South Wales, Victoria and South Australia with a view to expanding the organisation into an inter-state network to secure additional outlets for their material. Those present included Sir John Butters, chairman of BSA, R. E. Denison and Frederick Daniell, representing Denison Estates Ltd.; V. F. Mitchell of 4BC Brisbane; George Bennett, George Millar and Charles A. Fletcher of 2GB Sydney; C. V. Stevenson and Sydney S. E. Baume (brother of Eric Baume) of 2UE Sydney; John T. Taylor of 3AW Melbourne; Gordon Marsh of 5DN Adelaide; Clive Ogilvy and A. J. "Jack" Ryan of 2CA Canberra; Russell A. Yeldon of 2WL Wollongong; Eric and O. Robinson of 2HR Hunter River; J. J. Armitage and D. R. Armstrong of Broadcasting Service Association Ltd. In November the same year Bennett was sacked by Denison and Butters from both his managerial position with 2GB and as a director of BSA, though public pronouncements had him resigning voluntarily. Harold Gordon Horner, New South Wales manager for the Australian Broadcasting Commission, was appointed to take his place.

=== Macquarie Broadcasting ===
In July 1938 Hugh Denison announced a further expansion and reorganisation of the company as the Macquarie Broadcasting Service with a capital of A£250,000. The board consisted of Sir Hugh as chairman, Frederick Daniell as executive director, and George Millar as secretary; other founding directors were R. E. Denison, N. L. Shaw, C. Don Service, and S. S. Crick. H. G. Horner of 2GB, and C. V. Stevenson of 2UE were appointed advisory directors on broadcasting and technical matters respectively. George Anderson of 2GZ was appointed network sales manager. Affiliated stations in the new network were 2CA Canberra; 2GB and 2UE Sydney; 2WL South Coast; 2HR Hunter River; 3AW Melbourne; 3HA Hamilton; 3TR Sale; 3SH Swan Hill; 4BH Brisbane; 5DN Adelaide; 5RM Renmark; 6PR Perth; 6KG Kalgoorlie. Head office was at Savoy House, 29 Bligh Street, Sydney, and the Melbourne office at 37 Queen Street.

The new company purchased the worldwide transcription business of 2GB and BSA and placed under the direction of Frederick Daniell, with sales managed by Clive Ogilvy and Grace Gibson. The BSA Players were reorganised as the Macquarie Players, with their recording studios "Macquarie Productions" at Pagewood and at 296 Pitt Street and 29 Bligh Street. Contracted actors included James Raglan, Lou Vernon, Peter Finch, Betty Suttor and Harry Dearth. The company became a major shareholder in Australian and New Zealand Theatres, which had taken over the entertainment business JC Williamson's, and in Broadcast Enterprises of London. The Radio Theatre Guild was taken over as an organisation for training and developing talent. The record production, cutting and pressing business Featuradio was purchased and reorganised as Australian Record Company under management of Charles H. Gendle.

During the 1950s, the Macquarie Broadcasting Service and 2GB Radio awarded the Macquarie Awards for theatrical performances.

From inception and until the early 1960s, the network was renowned for its high quality productions of variety programs, quizzes, dramas and serials. Most of these programs originated from Sydney. One of the most important Macquarie drama series was The General Motors Hour, 15 episodes of which can be accessed online.

As well as being heard on all of the network's affiliates, right across the country, many Macquarie programs were also syndicated to non-network stations. With the coming of television in 1956, the radio audience for these types of programs dropped. Macquarie stations solved the problem by quickly increasing their news, talk, commentary and current affairs content.

1973 was a significant year because it marked the 50th anniversary of broadcasting in Australia. The Macquarie Network by that time consisted of the following affiliates: 2GB Sydney; 2CA Canberra; 2PK Parkes; 2WL Wollongong; 3AW Melbourne; 4BH Brisbane; 4BU Bundaberg; 4GY Gympie; 5DN Adelaide; 6IX Perth; 6BY Bunbury; 6MD Merredin; 6WB Katanning and 7HO Hobart.

During the 1930s to 1970s period, there were a number of other commercial radio networks, another key one being the Major Network. Other former radio networks include: Federal Network; Associated Broadcasters of Australia; AWA Broadcasting. There were also a number of State-based networks.

By the late 1980s Macquarie had become Australia's only national commercial radio network. However, during the last three decades, a number of new networks have arisen, including the Macquarie Regional RadioWorks, unrelated to the Macquarie Radio Network. In 2007, 13 networks owned or controlled 80 per cent of the 261 Australian commercial radio stations

In 2010, Macquarie entered a joint venture with Pacific Star Network to relaunch Melbourne radio station 3MP as MTR 1377. On 2 March 2012, MTR ceased operations when Pacific Star was unable to pay any monies owed to Macquarie.

On 31 August 2011, Macquarie acquired the Smart Radio Network which encompasses 4VL, Triple C FM, 4HI, 4ZR, 4LM, 4SB and Hot Country network at a cost of $6 million. These stations are part of Macquarie Regional Radio, which is a wholly owned subsidiary of the Macquarie Radio Network.

=== Macquarie Media ===
In December 2014, Macquarie announced that it had agreed to a merger with Fairfax Media. Under the deal, Fairfax gained a 55% share in the Macquarie Radio Network, with Macquarie's existing shareholders holding the remaining 45%. To comply with legislation only allowing two radio licences to be held by one party in each market, stations 2CH and 4LM were sold; and the merger was completed in March 2015.

In April 2015 a number of programming changes occurred at Macquarie's stations. At 4BC Brisbane, Breakfast presenters Ian Skippen and Loretta Ryan, Mornings host Patrick Condren, Nights host Walter Williams and Weekend Breakfast presenter Murray Shoring were dismissed, as well as sister Magic 882 Nights' presenter Jo Henderson. In total, 18 positions were cut, and programming replaced by networked shows from 2GB and 2UE. In Sydney, 2UE's afternoon announcer Angela Catterns was dismissed, as was the entire newsroom, and the station's news services were replaced by the Macquarie's national news service – while in Melbourne all of Magic 1278's lineup and most of the production team was cut.

On 30 October 2015 it was announced the company had divested its regional assets, selling eight radio stations to Resonate Broadcasting. On 6 November it was announced that all of Magic 882's programming – with the exception of nights – would be networked from Magic 1278 in Melbourne.

On 10 November 2015 the company changed its name to Macquarie Media Limited. Following its merger with Fairfax in 2018, Nine Entertainment acquired John Singleton's share in the company in 2019, increasing its stake in the company to 87%. In October 2019 Nine increased its shareholding to over 90% after purchasing stakes from Mark Carnegie (3.6 percent) and Alan Jones (1.3 percent) to allow Nine to compulsorily acquire the remaining shares. In January 2020, Nine confirmed that the Macquarie Media brand would be phased out.

=== Nine Radio ===
On 21 January 2020, Nine Radio announced the Macquarie Sports Radio network would close in February, reverting stations to their pre–2016 brands—2UE, 4BH and Magic 1278—with a classic hits music format. In April, Steve Jacobs was announced as breakfast presenter of the music stations, commencing 27 April.

=== Tapt Media ===
In January 2026, Nine Entertainment announced it had agreed terms to sell Nine Radio for $56 million to the Laundy family, a prominent Sydney hotel group. The sale was completed on 1 May 2026 following approval from the Australian Competition & Consumer Commission. Nine Radio was rebranded to Tapt Media.

== Assets ==
=== Tapt Media ===
==== News and Talk ====
Callsign	Frequency	Location	Launched date	Format
2GB	873 AM; DAB+ 9B	Sydney	23 August 1926	News and Talk
3AW	693 AM; DAB+ 9B	Melbourne	22 February 1932	News and Talk
4BC	882 AM; DAB+ 9B	Brisbane	16 August 1930	News and Talk
6PR	882 AM; DAB+ 9B	Perth	14 October 1931	News and Talk

==== Music ====
The following stations are run by Ace Radio under a lease agreement.

Station	Frequency	Call-sign	Location	Launched date	Format
2UE	954 AM; DAB+ 9A	2UE	Sydney	26 January 1925	Oldies
Magic 1278	1278 AM; DAB+ 9B	3EE	Melbourne	8 September 1935	Oldies
4BH	1116 AM; DAB+ 9B	4BH	Brisbane	2 January 1932	Oldies
