= B105 (Australian radio station) =

B105 (4BBB)
- Brisbane, Queensland; Australia
- Broadcast area: Brisbane; Gold Coast; Ipswich; Sunshine Coast
- Frequency: 105.3 MHz

Programming
- Language: English
- Format: Adult contemporary, Hot adult contemporary
- Affiliations: Hit Network

Ownership
- Owner: Southern Cross Austereo; (Today FM Brisbane Pty Ltd)
- Sister stations: Triple M

History
- First air date: 29 September 1930
- Former call signs: 4BK (1930–1990)
- Former frequencies: 1290 kHz (1930–1935); 1300 kHz (1935–1978); 1296 kHz (1978–1990)

Technical information
- Licensing authority: ACMA
- ERP: 12,000 watts
- HAAT: 365 m
- Transmitter coordinates: 27°27′47″S 152°56′54″E

Links
- Public licence information: Profile
- Website: Official website

B105 (call sign 4BBB) is a commercial FM radio station broadcasting in Brisbane, Queensland, Australia, on a frequency of 105.3 MHz, and is part of Southern Cross Austereo's Hit Network. The station has undergone numerous branding changes over the years; it was branded as B105 following its conversion from AM to FM. This lasted until a co-branding as Hit 105.3 B105, then as Hit B105 (dropping the "B" shortly after) and finally back to B105 in July 2020.

== History ==
The station began life as 4BK, commencing transmission in 1930 on the AM band, initially on the frequency 1290 kHz before changing to 1300 kHz on 1 Sep 1935 (to accord with the new Australian 10 kHz channel spacing raster). Again the implementation by Australia of the 9 kHz channel spacing raster developed by the ITU and formalised in the 1975 Geneva Plan necessitated 4BK moving to 1296 kHz on 23 November 1978.

In 1987, Hoyts purchased the station from Northern Star Holdings. In 1988, Austereo purchased the station, intending to use it as a vehicle to bid for an FM conversion licence. Austereo won the FM licence, and in February 1990, the station changed its callsign to 4BBB (not used on-air except during test broadcasts, unlike the previous AM callsign) and commenced broadcasting on a frequency of 105.3 MHz with the on-air name B105.

Between March 1990 until 2006 it was the highest rating station in Brisbane, except in one ratings survey in 1994, beaten by AM station 4KQ.

In April 2011 Austereo was purchased by Southern Cross Media for more than $700 million, and is now operated under the name Southern Cross Austereo.

On 6 March 2015, B105 rebranded as Hit 105. On 27 July 2020, Hit 105 rebranded back to B105.

== Studios ==
The 4BK studio complex, an AM radio facility was located at 16 Campbell Street Bowen Hills. When the FM conversion license was granted, the Austereo group converted the premises to an FM facility and began broadcasting as B105 FM in 1990.

The B105 studio complex remained at the Bowen Hills location until July 2000, when Austereo relocated B105 and sister station Triple M into new combined premises at 309 North Quay, Brisbane. The new complex was the first in Australia to use the now defunct Klotz Digital audio system, which was revolutionary at the time however was replaced during a 2016 studio upgrade with Axia Fusion.

In June 2019, B105 moved from North Quay into new studios at The Barracks on Petrie Terrace.

== Transmission ==
4BBB's FM transmission has always emanated from the TVQ Ten tower at Mount Coot-tha, Brisbane. The station originally used two Harris HT10 tube transmitters in an A/B failsafe configuration to deliver the service. In 2002 a new solid state Harris Z10CD transmitter was installed at the newly created TX Australia facility, located under the TVQ Ten tower. The existing HT10 transmitter now serves as a backup facility located at the BTQ Seven tower, 1 kilometre (0.62 mi) away from Channel Ten on Mount Coot-tha. B105's service is licensed for 12kW Effective Radiated Power at the antenna, and operates its transmitters at 5kW base power.

B105 and Southern Cross Austereo's DAB services all emanate from the TVQ Ten tower on combined equipment used by all radio broadcasters in Brisbane.

== On Air Schedule ==
6:00am–9:00am: Stav, Abby & Matt

9:00am–11:00am: Aimee Craig

11:00am–3:00pm: Ellie Angel-Mobbs

3:00pm–6:00pm: Carrie & Tommy

6:00pm–7:00pm: Fifi, Fev & Nick's Happy Hour

7:00pm–10:00pm: The Hot Hits with Nic & Loren (Mon-Thurs)

7:00pm–10:00pm: Lucy & Nikki (Friday)
