= Triple M Newcastle =

Adult contemporary radio station in Newcastle, New South Wales

- Newcastle, New South Wales; Australia
- Broadcast area: Hunter Valley; Newcastle; Lake Macquarie; Central Coast
- Frequency: 102.9 MHz

Programming
- Format: Mainstream rock Adult contemporary
- Network: Triple M

Ownership
- Owner: Southern Cross Austereo (Radio Newcastle Pty Ltd)

History
- First air date: 1 August 1931
- Former call signs: 2KO (1931–1992)
- Former frequencies: 1415 kHz (1931–1935); 1410 kHz (1935–1978); 1413 kHz (1978–1992)
- Call sign meaning: 2K KOtara from former call sign 2KO

Technical information
- ERP: 20,000 watts

Triple M Newcastle (call sign: 2KKO) is an Australian radio station, licensed to, and serving Newcastle and surrounds. It broadcasts at 102.9 megahertz on the FM band from its studios in Newcastle. It is owned by Southern Cross Austereo.

== History ==
The station commenced operations on 1 August 1931 as 2KO, based in the Newcastle suburb of KOtara, hence the call-sign. Founded by Allen Fairhall, 2KO was licensed to The Newcastle Broadcasting Company. The station broadcast on 1415 kHz with a transmission strength of 25 watts. The station launched from the backyard of a resident's home, with the licensee's dining room being the only studio the station had at the time. Programs ran from 7:00pm to 10:00pm, later moving into daytime programming.

Two years later in 1933, the station moved its AM transmitter to Sandgate, and was operated from several locations including 72 Hunter Street, Newcastle until January 1937, when new studios and offices in the heart of Newcastle in the CML Building at 110 Hunter Street. In its time on the AM band, the station had its power increased twice, first to 2,000 watts, and then to 5,000 watts, using a directional aerial system.

In the days before television, peak listening time was around 8pm, but with television arriving in the country in the late 1950s, the station had to change formats to survive the new medium. This was even more the case when 2KO's owners at the time, United Broadcasting Company (who also owned Sydney's 2UE), itself owned by the local Lamb family, was part of the consortium that brought television to Newcastle, launching NBN Television on channel 3 in 1962.

These changes led to 2KO becoming a Top 40 music radio station. This took the audience by storm, and helped re-established radio as the personal medium.

Until 1978 there was a 10 kHz gap between radio stations. However, the Geneva Frequency Plan of 1975 changed this to a 9 kHz gap, thus allowing more stations on the AM band. Therefore, on 23 November 1978, most Australian stations changed their frequencies and 2KO went from 1410 kHz to 1413 kHz.

In May 1988, 2KO moved to facilities at 252 Pacific Highway, Charlestown. KOFM / NXFM use MAESTRO for music play out & Automation after network programs until live assist. By 1989 it was owned by Wesgo.

On 12 October 1992, 2KO converted to the FM band, changing its callsign to 2KKO, and branding itself as KOFM 102.9. Four years later, on 22 January 1996, the parent company of KOFM was purchased by Austereo. A few more years later, Austereo sold 50% to RG Capital, whose stake in the station then transferred in 2004 to Macquarie Regional RadioWorks, upon the purchase of RG Capital's stations. In April 2011 Southern Cross Media bought out Austereo giving Southern Cross Media full ownership of KOFM.

In late June 2017, the station again moved but this time to state of the art facilities in 18 Honeysuckle Drive.

On 9 November 2018, KOFM was renamed to Triple M Newcastle.

== Presenters ==
=== On air line-up ===
Monday to Friday

- Tanya & Steve 6:00am–9:00am
- Jeremy Ryan 9:00am to 2:00pm
- Lu and Jarch 2:00pm to 4:00pm
- The Rush Hour with Anthony Maroon, Millie Elliot and Nathan Hindmarsh 4:00pm to 6:00pm
- Tanya & Steve Catchup 6:00pm–7:00pm
- Nights with Dave Gleeson 7:00pm–10:00pm
- Triple M Aussie with Matty O 10:00pm–Midnight
- Triple M NRL (March–October)

Sadly Luke Bona's Night Shift Program was axed from operation on Friday 21st February 2025.

Weekends

- Weekends with Nix
- Triple M NRL (March–October)
- All Newcastle Knights games with Jim Callinan, Andrew Ryan, Michael Hagan and Jeremy Ryan
- Triple M Aussie with Matty O 10:00pm–Midnight (Saturday & Sunday)

News

- News Director: David Dollin
- News Presenters: Dan Flegg

=== Rugby League coverage ===
Following Broadcast Operations Group's decision not to carry the Continuous Call Team from 2GB in Sydney, and therefore, ruling that rival 2HD could not carry Newcastle Knights games, KOFM picked up the program (and rights to Knights games), beginning 2006. KOFM also poached long time 2HD commentator Gary Harley continued his role as commentator on Knights games until dismissal early 2014. Triple M no longer carries 2GB's coverage anymore due to Triple M Sydney's successful bid for NRL broadcast rights (but broadcast Knights games with local content).
