= Triple M Brisbane =

Triple M Brisbane (4MMM)
- Brisbane, Queensland; Australia
- Broadcast area: Brisbane; Gold Coast; Sunshine Coast; Ipswich
- Frequency: 104.5 MHz FM (also on DAB+)
- Branding: Triple M

Programming
- Format: Active rock
- Affiliations: Triple M

Ownership
- Owner: Southern Cross Austereo
- Sister stations: B105

History
- First air date: 22 August 1980
- Former frequencies: 104.1 MHz (1980–1989)

Technical information
- ERP: 12,000 watts
- HAAT: 365 m
- Transmitter coordinates: 27°27′47″S 152°56′54″E

Links
- Website: Official website

Triple M Brisbane (callsign 4MMM) is a commercial FM rock radio station in Brisbane, Australia. It broadcasts on 104.5 and on DAB+ digital radio. It is affiliated with the Triple M stations owned by SCA in other cities, but many of its programs are local.

== History ==
Triple M Brisbane started on the FM band at 104.1 MHz on 22 August 1980. Brisbane businessman Leo Williams was the driving force behind the venture. The station manager was Rob McKay, who held the position for three years. He was succeeded by the Program Manager, Ted Seymour in 1983. Their first format was contemporary rock. The station was rebranded as FM104 in December 1982 with the new slogan "Rock in Stereo" and focused on a Classic Rock Format and Brisbane’s typical Queensland lifestyle of beaches and barbecues.

Their playlists then included AC/DC, The Angels, Van Halen, ZZ Top and Talking Heads as well as supporting Australian pub rock bands such as INXS, Hunters & Collectors and the Choirboys. Mixed with Classic Rock from Rolling Stones, Beatles, Jimi Hendrix, the Who etc.

On 10 January 1982, the pioneering program Incontact was launched, one of the first Christian music programs to feature in ratings time (5 am-12 midnight) in Australia. The Sunday night maintained the station's high ratings audience until midnight and aired weekly until April 1990. Over 21 Australian premieres and the World Premiere of US rock band Whiteheart's 'Emergency Broadcast' album featured in the music as well as co-promotion of the 1987 Stryper concert at Brisbane's Festival Hall.

In 1983, slogans "FM104 Rocks the Weekend", "FM104 Rocks Brisbane", and "FM104 Rock in Stereo" were starting to be used. The first number-one rating success occurred in the 7 to midnight time slot during the second survey of 1983, achieving an impressive 26% share. The station became number one overall in October 1984, with a total audience share of 18.2%.

FM104 reached a record 37.9% share during the 1988 Brisbane expo, making them the only radio station to achieve this. They were number one in Brisbane from late 1984 until 1990. The breakfast shift, with Bill Healy and Mr T, was also consistently number one. Promotions, including the Skyshow featuring the first afterburner F111s in the world, and involvement in all things Brisbane supplemented the popular on-air format.

During their 1980s domination, FM104 also pioneered cross-platform endeavours. One of the most noteworthy was the weekly late-night music show "Sevenrock in Stereo" hosted by programmer Bill Riner. Sevenrock was a simulcast with BTQ Channel 7 broadcasting monaural video and FM104 the stereo sound. Other simulcast ventures included Star Wars with TVQ Channel 0.

In 1988, it was purchased from Qintex by Hoyts and rebranded Triple M. From then on, it became known as FM104 Triple M, maintaining its call sign 4MMM. A change of frequency to 104.5 MHz took place on 5 November 1989.

In 1990, changes in management and staff changes at Triple M led to a decline in performance. Around the same time, a new FM station called B105 gained popularity with rap and dance music, taking over the top spot. When the Austereo group purchased Triple M as part of its takeover and merger of the Triple M and Today networks in 1995, the FM104 tag was dropped. However, the FM104 Tag has resurfaced recently in station sweepers and jingles, along with some retrospective commentary by announcers.

In April 2011, the regional media giant Southern Cross Media bought the Austereo group for more than $700 million. Southern Cross Media is the current owner of the Triple M network, and all Triple M branded stations are now operated under the parent company Southern Cross Austereo.

== Studios ==
The FM104 studios were initially based on the top floor of 67 St Paul's Terrace. Not much is known about the original installation.

New facilities were later occupied at 549 Queen Street, Brisbane. This building is full of character, featuring a quirky lift, green carpets and a distinctive spiral staircase linking the two floors. The basement carpark, reserved for executives and station vehicles, was tiny and difficult to enter and exit. The building also hosted numerous wild parties with many famous guests over many years.

The Queen Street equipment included MTE mixing consoles and ITC Delta cartridge machines. FM104 Triple M did not adopt the "Digital Commercial System" (DCS) that was implemented in most other Austereo stations. Instead, FM104 Triple M continued to use outdated cartridge machines until 1999, when the updated Maestro digital play-out system was installed as part of an Austereo nationwide upgrade.

From 1998 to 2000, Triple M's news was broadcast from the newsroom of sister station B105 FM in a combined newsroom arrangement. A high-speed microwave WAN link was also installed between the two stations to enable data connectivity.

FM104, and later Triple M Brisbane, broadcast from the Queen Street location until August 2000, when Austereo relocated Triple M and sister station B105 into new combined premises at 309 North Quay, Brisbane.

The new complex was the first in Australia to use the now-defunct Klotz Digital VADIS audio system, which was revolutionary at the time. After 16 years, the original Klotz installation at the North Quay facility was phased out and replaced with an Axia Audio over IP system manufactured by US-based Telos Systems.

Southern Cross Austereo announced that in 2019 Triple M and B105 will move into new facilities at The Barracks

== Transmission ==
FM104 was originally transmitted using two RCA BTF-20E 20 kilowatt transmitters in an A/B failsafe configuration running from the BTQ Seven towers at Mount Coot-tha. An increase in Effective radiated power was granted in the early 1990s, and an arrangement was reached with a rival station B105 to share a new antenna, combiner, and floor space at TVQ Ten, which had a higher tower.

An Electronics Research Inc (ERI) FM array was installed on the tower, combined through an RF combiner to allow both 105.3 (B105) and 104.5 (4MMM) to transmit at 5 kW base power on the same array. 4MMM had a 20 kW RCA transmitter moved from the BTQ site and an NEC 10 kW transmitter installed at this site, in an A/B failsafe configuration. One of the original 20 kW RCA transmitters was left in place at BTQ seven as a backup, leaving 4MMM as one of the most redundant ready stations in Brisbane, with three transmitters to choose from and two different transmission sites.

4MMM continued to use the same transmitter configuration until 2002. After the merger with B105 FM, which had two Harris HT10 transmitters operating in A/B failsafe, an upgrade was done, which saw a new solid state Harris Z10CD transmitter tuned to 104.5 MHz installed at the newly created TX Australia facility under the TVQ Ten tower. One of B105 FM's existing HT10 transmitters was re-tuned to 104.5 MHz and installed at the Channel Seven tower, 1 kilometre (0.62 mi) away from Channel Ten on Mount Coot-tha as a backup. Both original RCA transmitters were sold for scrap, and the NEC transmitter eventually went to Broadcast Australia for parts.

As of June 2012, Triple M Brisbane had a main Harris Z10CD solid-state transmitter located at TVQ Ten and a secondary HT10FM tube transmitter located at BTQ Seven. In case it was needed, there was a spare antenna (the original B105 FM1C) at the TVQ Ten tower.

TX Australia is currently under contract to maintain all of Austereo Brisbane's FM transmission infrastructure, including antennas, transmitters, and combiners.

Broadcast Australia are under contract to maintain the digital radio infrastructure for all Brisbane radio stations.

4MMM's FM base power is 5 kilowatts with an ERP (Effective Radiated Power) of 12 kilowatts at the antenna. The digital radio base power from the Mt Coot-tha site is 1.8 kW with an ERP of 12 kW at the antenna.

== 25th Anniversary Celebration ==
In August 2005, 4MMM hosted a weekend-long celebration commemorating 25 years of broadcasting. Archived audio was rebroadcast, including interviews with former programmer Bill Riner and other former DJs.

The weekend culminated in a Sunday afternoon broadcast from the station's carpark at 309 North Quay, with drinks, food, and live-to-air performances from The Screaming Jets, The Choirboys and Glenn Shorrock. The single 'Cool Change' from Shorrock's 'Little River Band' was the first song ever played to air on 4MMM.

== Football ==
=== AFL ===
Triple M broadcasts complete coverage of AFL matches featuring the Brisbane Lions. The football calls are overseen by Triple M's Head of AFL, Ewan Giles, and are relayed to other Triple M interstate stations as needed. Other interstate matches are called by different commentary teams and networked in Brisbane.

=== NRL ===
Triple M broadcasts full commentary of selected NRL matches. These games are generally played on Thursday, Friday, Saturday, Sunday and Monday nights and are broadcast live from the relevant stadiums. Brisbane matches held at Lang Park are often hosted by lead commentator Anthony Maroon and feature special comments by former Brisbane Broncos player Gorden Tallis and sideline updates from Ben Dobbin. Schedule 5:30am-9am triple m breakfast with Marto Margaux and Dan 9am-12pm Ben dobbin 12pm-3pm Josh olek 3pm-4pm Troy Ellis 4pm-6pm triple m rush hour with Dobbo and Eliott 6pm-7pm 7pm-10pm triple m nights with Dave Gleeson 10pm-12am triple m homegrown with Matty O

== Digital Radio ==
Triple M is a simulcast on Digital Radio in Brisbane. It is hosted on Ensemble 2 with all of Southern Cross Austereo's digital offerings.

In 2018, Triple M Launched "Triple M Soft Rock", that predominantly played 80's pop-rock and regular stadium rock, accessible on DAB+ and on the Triple M App. In 2022, it was rebranded as "Triple M 80's", to better represent its music content.
