= Triple M Riverina MIA =

Triple M Riverina MIA 963
- Griffith, New South Wales, Australia; Australia
- Broadcast area: Griffith RA1
- Frequency: 963 kHz AM

Programming
- Language: English
- Format: Classic hits
- Affiliations: Triple M

Ownership
- Owner: Southern Cross Austereo; (Radio 2RG Pty Ltd)
- Sister stations: hit99.7 Riverina MIA

History
- First air date: 14 September 1936
- Former frequencies: 1070 kHz AM (1936–1978)
- Call sign meaning: 2 – New South Wales; Radio Griffith

Technical information
- Transmitter coordinates: 34.3297°S 146.1325°E
- Repeater: 92.5 FM Lake Cowal mine

Links
- Webcast: Listen Live
- Website: Official website

Triple M Riverina MIA 963 (ACMA call sign: 2RG) is an Australian radio station in New South Wales. Owned and operated as part of Southern Cross Austereo's Triple M network, it broadcasts a classic hits format to Griffith, New South Wales and surrounding areas. The station launched on 14 September 1936, and marked only the second commercial radio station to launch in the Riverina. The station was formerly operated by DMG Regional Radio, Macquarie Regional RadioWorks and Southern Cross Media Group - and broadcasts from studios in Griffith alongside sister station hit99.7 Riverina MIA.

After first being announced in September 2016, 2RG was rebranded Triple M 963AM on 15 December 2016 as a result of a nationwide rebrand of Southern Cross Austereo's radio stations.
