= Qintex =

Australian financial services company

Qintex Limited
- Formerly: Takeovers, Equities & Management Securities (1975–1986)
- Type: Public
- Traded as: ASX: QNT
- Industry: Media, Hotels, Retail
- Founded: 1 April 1975 as Takeovers, Equities & Management Securities (TEAM)
- Defunct: 9 January 1991 (15 years, 9 months and 8 days)
- Fate: Fell into bankruptcy, receivership, and liquidation Assets bundled together & placed within Seven Network Limited
- Successor: Seven Network Limited
- Headquarters: Brisbane, Australia
- Key people: Christopher Skase (Managing Director)
- Subsidiaries: Qintex Australia; Qintex Entertainment/Qintex Productions (43% at time of Bankruptcy)

Qintex Limited was an Australian financial services company founded on 1 April 1975, as Takeovers, Equities & Management Securities (TEAM). Its headquarters was in Brisbane, Australia. Its main shareholder and managing director was Christopher Skase. It was renamed Qintex Limited and came to prominence in 1986, collapsing five years later in 1991. At its peak, Qintex owned interests in Channel 7, Mirage Resorts, Hardy Brothers jewellery retail concern and a number of other businesses.

== History ==
Qintex was established in 1975 by Christopher Skase and his then partners. After separating due to diffences of opinion, Skase expanded the company substantially, initially into retail with investments in Hardy Brothers and car dealer Nettlefolds. Qintex also expanded into small scale property developments.

In 1984, Qintex bought television station TVQ-0 in Brisbane. Later Qintex purchased HSV-7 and ATN-7 in Melbourne and Sydney from John Fairfax & Sons but had to relinquish some due to Australian media ownership laws. In 1986, the company invested in an entertainment company named Qintex Entertainment, formed by the merger of American studios Hal Roach Studios and Robert Halmi Incorporated. The company was also financially involved with the establishment of the Brisbane Bears football club.

In October 1988, radio stations 4HI, 4LG and 4MK were sold to Wesgo.. In 1989, the company was struggling to meet interest payments and sold its share in Mirage Resorts for more than $433 million. The first signs of collapse showed in October 1989, when the American subsidiary filed for Chapter 11 bankruptcy protection after Qintex failed to provide financing for a debt payment. The Australian Securities Exchange suspended Qintex's stock shortly after when the company failed to respond to questions of its financial health. A month later, in November 1989, Qintex went into receivership with debts of over A$1.9 billion. The collapse happened just six weeks after the company lost a bid to acquire United Artists studios for A$1.5 billion.

In 1990, with uncetrainty about Quintex's viability rising, and irregularites of its financial management increasing, Skase was summoned to appear before the National Companies and Securities Commission. It was in 1991 that Qintex finally filed for bankruptcy and was liquidated. Bank-appointed receivers then created Seven Network Limited in order to bundle together the bankrupt company's assets. Its collapse was prompted by what was later seen as an excessive amount of debt in the business. This coincided with very high interest rates that prevailed in 1989. When the company missed interest payments and was not able to renegotiate its position with the Commonwealth Bank, the bank appointed a receiver to the company.
