= Triple M Perth =

Coordinates: 31°56′46″S 115°49′13″E

Triple M Perth (6MMM)
- Perth; Australia
- Frequency: 92.9 MHz FM

Programming
- Language: English
- Format: Mainstream rock
- Affiliations: Triple M

Ownership
- Owner: Southern Cross Austereo; (Consolidated Broadcasting System (WA) Pty Ltd)
- Sister stations: Mix 94.5

History
- First air date: 22 April 1937 (as 6PM); 31 December 1990 (as 6PPM); 19 January 2015 (as Hit92.9!); 1 December 2020 (as Triple M (6MMM))
- Former call signs: 1937–1990: 6PM; 1991–2020: 6PPM
- Former frequencies: 1937–1973: 1000 kHz AM; 1973–1990: 990 kHz AM
- Call sign meaning: Triple M

Technical information
- Licensing authority: ACMA
- ERP: 40 kW

Links
- Website: triplem.listnr.com/perth/

Triple M Perth (official callsign: 6MMM) is a commercial radio station owned and operated by Southern Cross Austereo as part of the Triple M network. The station is broadcast to Perth, Western Australia from studios in Subiaco.

The station commenced broadcasting in 1937 as 6PM, initially on the AM band at a frequency of 1000 kilohertz, before converting to the FM band as 6PM-FM on 31 December 1990. The station was later branded as PMFM, The All New 92.9, 92.9 and Hit 92.9. On 1 December 2020, the station was relaunched as Triple M, switching network affiliation with sister station Mix 94.5.

== History ==
The station was originally 6PM on the AM band, beginning broadcasting on 22 April 1937 making it the third commercial radio station in Perth. Originally broadcasting from a radio mast in Fremantle, the station moved its transmission mast to Coffee Point in Applecross in 1940 to give better reception to listeners north of Perth.

From the 1960s to the 1980s, it broadcast a top 40 format on 1000, later 990 kHz. The station secured significant listener market share despite rival station 96FM's de-facto monopoly on the FM band in the 1980s.

PMFM logo

On 31 December 1990, the station was one of two additional Perth radio stations to gain a licence to convert to the FM band. They became 92.9 6PM-FM; then subsequently PMFM. The official call sign was changed to 6PPM for regulatory purposes to reflect the move to FM. During most of the 1990s PMFM was Perth's number one radio station.

2001 saw PMFM change their name to The All New 92.9, and then to just 92.9. In February 2006, 92.9 changed its logo in line with the rest of the Today Network. In 2007 92.9 and sister station Mix 94.5 moved to a new purpose-built building at 450 Roberts Road, Subiaco.

On 19 January 2015, Southern Cross Austereo rebranded 92.9 as Hit 92.9.

On 1 December 2020, Hit 92.9 relaunched as Triple M Perth, joining the Triple M network and adopting a mainstream rock music format. The Hit Network affiliation was switched to sister station Mix 94.5. The station was officially launched at 8:00 am with a welcome message from Foo Fighters frontman Dave Grohl, with "All My Life" being the first song played on the newly relaunched station. The station later announced that Basil Zempilas would host the station's breakfast program, along with Xavier Ellis and the West Australian columnist Jenna Clarke from 2021.

Ellis has remained on the breakfast show and as of 2024, co-hosts it with Katie Lamb on Breakfast with Xav and Katie. The station since 2025 airs the Melbourne produced The Rush Hour with JB and Billy which replaced a local version of the Rush Hour brand that was co-hosted by Lamb and Andrew Embley.

== Transmission ==
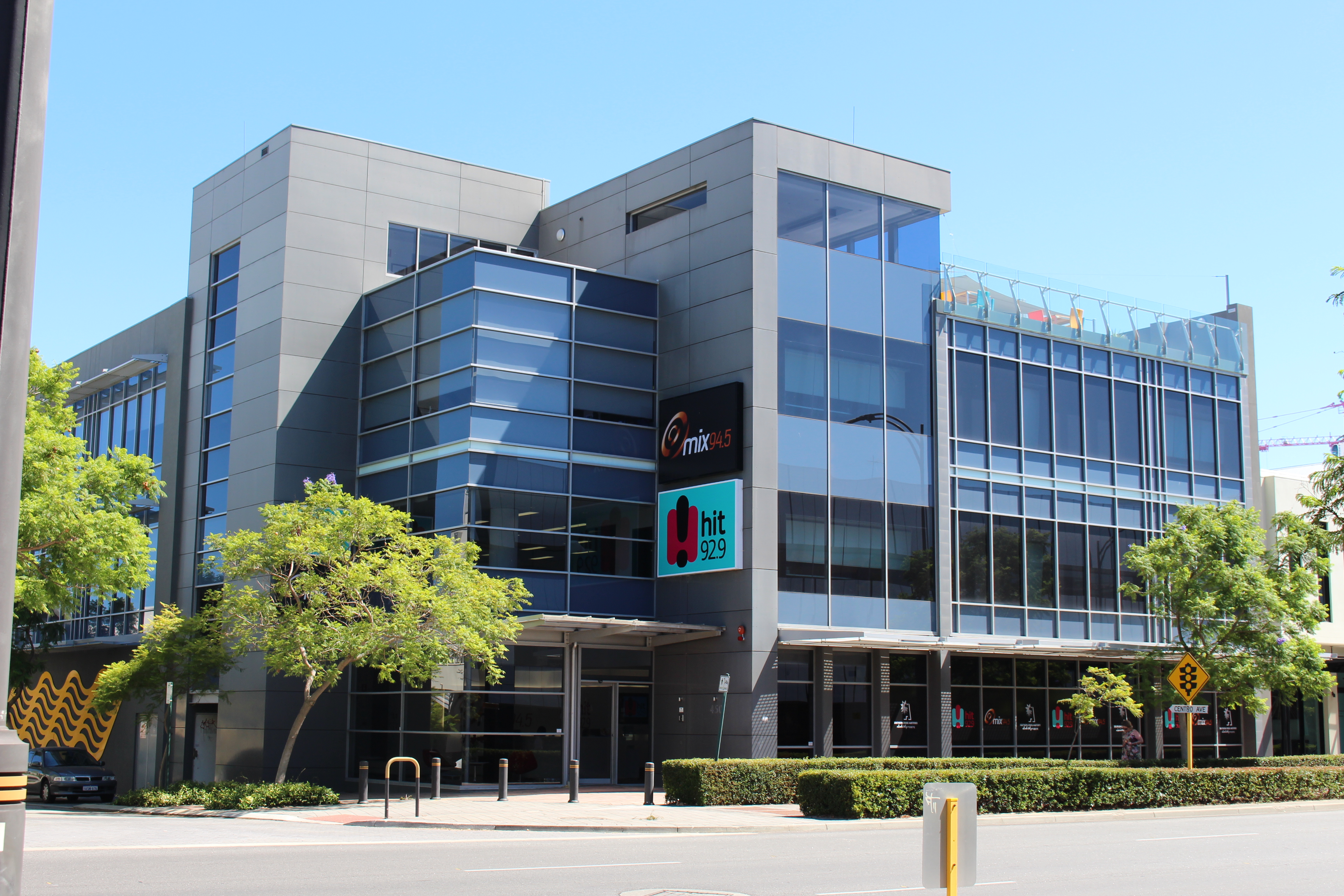
HIT 92.9's broadcast centre prior to its rebranding to Triple M Perth in Subiaco, which also houses Mix 94.5

Since being on the FM band, the 92.9 station has broadcast from a transmitter site next to the Channel 7 tower from Bickley in the Perth Hills. It shares its transmitter with sister station Mix 94.5 and 96FM. They use a combiner and share the same antenna array. The Bickley site is redundant now and the main site is at Carmel into the same antenna array as Nova 93.7 and Mix 94.5. The original AM transmitter for 6PM was at Coffee Point in Applecross. The ERP is at 40 kW, covering the north and south of Perth. As well as covering Perth, Triple M Perth can be heard as far north as New Norcia, south to Waroona and east to Northam.

== Digital radio ==
Triple M Perth is simulcast on digital radio in Perth.

92.9 launched Choose The Hits Jelli, a station only broadcast on digital radio, was launched on 1 February 2010, and closed on 26 May 2010.

== See also ==
- List of radio stations in Australia
