= SAFM (Adelaide) =

SAFM (5SSA)
- Adelaide, South Australia; Australia
- Frequency: 107.1 MHz
- Branding: SAFM

Programming
- Language: English
- Format: Hot adult contemporary
- Network: Hit Network

Ownership
- Owner: Southern Cross Austereo; (SCA Digital Pty Ltd)
- Sister stations: Triple M Adelaide

History
- First air date: 12 September 1980
- Former frequencies: 107.5 MHz (1980–1989)
- Call sign meaning: Stereo South Australia

Technical information
- Licensing authority: ACMA
- ERP: 20,000 watts
- Transmitter coordinates: 34.98104°S 138.708078°E
- Repeater: 90.3 MHz Adelaide Hills

Links
- Public licence information: Profile
- Website: Official website

SAFM (official callsign: 5SSA) is a commercial FM radio station owned and operated by Southern Cross Austereo as part of the Hit Network. The station is broadcast to Adelaide, South Australia from studios in Franklin Street.

== History ==
It was the first commercial radio station to broadcast on the FM band in Adelaide started by Paul Thompson of the Austereo Network. The first song played on air was "Sultans of Swing" by Dire Straits. Initially, SAFM was somewhat of a fringe operation, hampered largely by the fact that many houses, and more importantly most contemporary cars, did not have the ability to receive FM radio broadcasts.

It changed its name to "SAFM" and in 1989 altered its frequency slightly to 107.1 MHz. A second frequency, 91.1 MHz, was added as what was the first of many repeater frequencies in Adelaide, required due to Adelaide's sometimes problematic television and radio reception idiosyncrasies. The frequency was later changed to 90.3 MHz and it continues to operate on that frequency.

SAFM was the first station in the world to have Black Thunder promotional vehicles and the annual Australia Day Sky-Show fireworks display was an Adelaide institution for many years.

Between 1984 and 1993 it was the highest rating station in Adelaide and achieving its best survey results in the late '80s, spearheaded by the "Morning Zoo" breakfast show.

From its inception SAFM was an adult rock-based format, before switching to a contemporary hit radio (CHR) format in March 1996. In November 2003, the station adopted an adult contemporary music format, reverting to CHR in December 2004 following the launch of rival station Nova 919.

On 20 October 2014, the station was relaunched as Hit 107, but reverted to SAFM on 27 July 2020 as part of a network-wide relaunch, shifting to a hot adult contemporary music format in an attempt to target a 30–54-year-old audience.

In October 2022, it was reported that the breakfast show Bec, Cosi and Lehmo would be axed.

== Programming ==
Local programming is produced and broadcast from the station's Franklin Street studios from 6am–3pm weekdays. The station's local output consists of a three-hour breakfast show, Bel and Bernie presented by Bel Sloane and Bernie Vince, a three-hour morning show presented by Nicole and a three-hour afternoon show presented by Sean Craig Murphy. In addition, the station's breakfast show is also broadcast on its Mount Gambier sister station.

Networked programming originates from studios in Melbourne and Sydney.

== Digital radio ==
SAFM is simulcast on DAB+ Digital radio in Adelaide.

== See also ==
- Hamish & Andy
- List of radio stations in Australia
- Music podcast
