= 4LG =

- Longreach; Australia
- Broadcast area: Longreach RA1
- Frequency: 1098 kHz

Programming
- Language: English

Ownership
- Owner: Resonate Broadcasting
- Sister stations: West FM

History
- First air date: 5 May 1936
- Former frequencies: 1100 kHz (5 May 1936)

Technical information
- Power: 2 kW
- Transmitter coordinates: 23°23′42″S 144°13′9″E

Links
- Website: radio4lg.com.au

4LG is an Australian radio station serving the Longreach region owned and operated by Resonate Broadcasting. It was founded in May 1936.

In March 1988 4LG was sold by Qintex to Wesgo. To comply with Government of Australia cross ownership laws, the station was sold three months later to Ray Rumble.
