= West FM (Queensland) =

- Australia
- Broadcast area: South West, Central West and North Queensland
- Frequency: see Transmitters
- Branding: West FM

Programming
- Language: English
- Format: Adult contemporary

Ownership
- Owner: Resonate Broadcasting
- Sister stations: 4GC; 4LG; 4VL

History
- First air date: 27 June 1997

Links
- Website: Official website

West FM is a commercial radio station in regional Queensland, Australia. Owned and operated by Resonate Broadcasting, the station commenced broadcasting to Longreach on 26 June 1997, expanding to Charleville in 2016, and Charters Towers in 2017.

== History ==
West FM commenced broadcasting in Longreach after sister station 4LG was granted a secondary FM licence. On 27 July 1999, Triple C FM commenced broadcasting to Charleville, a sister station to 4VL. Both Triple C and 4VL would later be sold to the Smart Radio Group, and in 2011 to the Macquarie Radio Network. Following the sale of Macquarie's Queensland assets to Resonate Broadcasting, in 2016 Triple C FM rebranded as West FM and commenced sharing programming with the Longreach station of the same name.

Also in 1997, 4GC Charters Towers was too granted a secondary licence, which launched on 13 October as Hot FM. In 2008, following the acquisition of Southern Cross Broadcasting's television assets, owners Macquarie Regional RadioWorks were made to divest the station to Resonate Broadcasting. Despite this, the station continued to share programming with Hot FM Mount Isa – later hit102.5 – until 2017, when Resonate Broadcasting rebranded the station as West FM alongside the Longreach and Charleville stations.

== Transmitters ==
West FM programming is broadcast via three full power stations.

Call sign	Frequency	Broadcast area	ERP W	Transmitter coordinates	Notes
4CCC	101.7 FM	Charleville, Queensland	2,000	26°24′16″S 146°14′40″E	Was Triple C FM until 2016
4CHT	95.9 FM	Charters Towers, Queensland	1,500	20°5′21″S 146°15′9″E	Was hit95.9 until 2017
4LRE	104.5 FM	Longreach, Queensland	1,000	23°23′36″S 144°13′16″E	

The three full power stations feed a further seven repeater stations.

Frequency	Broadcast area	ERP W	Transmitter coordinates
98.1 FM	Aramac, Queensland	50	22°58′5″S 145°14′35″E
100.9 FM	Barcaldine, Queensland	100	23°33′24″S 145°17′35″E
95.1 FM	Blackall, Queensland	100	24°25′13″S 145°27′55″E
96.5 FM	Cunnamulla, Queensland	100	28°6′42″S 145°41′31″E
97.3 FM	Muttaburra, Queensland	50	22°35′40″S 144°32′54″E
101.9 FM	Tambo, Queensland	100	24°52′56″S 146°15′15″E
95.9 FM	Winton, Queensland	100	22°23′11″S 143°2′15″E
