= 4HI =

Coordinates: 23°31′02″S 148°09′23″E

- Emerald, Queensland, Australia; Australia
- Broadcast area: Central Highlands Region
- Frequency: 1143 kHz AM
- Branding: 1143 4HI AM

Programming
- Format: Classic hits

Ownership
- Owner: Resonate Broadcasting

History
- First air date: 30 November 1981
- Call sign meaning: 4 – Queensland; HIghlands

Technical information
- Power: 5kW
- Repeaters: 88.1 MHz FM Blair Athol coal mine 103.7 MHz FM Blackwater; 102.1 MHz FM Clermont; 945 kHz AM Dysart; 92.5 MHz FM North Goonyella coal mine 93.7 MHz FM Goonyella Riverside Mine; 1215 kHz AM Moranbah/Nebo; 106.9 MHz FM Peak Downs Mine

Links
- Website: www.4hi.com.au

4HI is a Classic Hits radio station in Emerald, Queensland, Australia.

== Ownership ==
In March 1988 4HI was sold by Qintex to Wesgo. To comply with Government of Australia cross ownership laws, the station was sold three months later to Ray Rumble.

The station was later owned by Smart Radio Group and included in its September 2011 sale to Macquarie Regional Radio who sold it to Resonate Broadcasting in October 2015. Macquarie Radio Network was forced to sell its regional stations, including 4HI, to comply with Australian Communications & Media Authority legislation following the 2014 merger between the Macquarie Radio Network and Fairfax Media.

== Broadcast area ==
4HI broadcasts to the greater Central Highland and Coalfields area of Queensland on a total of eleven transmitters, serving various local communities and coal mines in the region.

The station's main three AM transmitters are located in Emerald, Dysart and Moranbah, while the less powerful FM repeaters are located at Clermont, Rolleston, Sojitz Minerva Mine, BMA Blackwater Mine, Blair Athol Mine, Peak Downs Mine, Goonyella North Mine and Goonyella Riverside Mine.

== 1980s, The beginnings of 4HI ==
The station format during its early years was based on hits and memories, with Program Director and Music Director Michael J Bailey. General Manager was 'Father' Foley (John Foley). Sales manager was Glen Elms. Reception was leanne Foley. The studio was on Hospital Road in Emerald.

Music was on vinyl, commercials were on a cart rack behind the announcer, and the panel was an old 2SM console, with rotating bakelite knobs for volume control.

The on-air line-up in the beginning, consisted of:

| Time | Show name |
|---|---|
| 6:00 am – 9:00 am | Michael J Bailey |
| 9:00 am – 12:00 pm | Peter Rossberg |
| 12:00 pm – 3:00 pm | John 'Waldo' Wall |
| 3:00 pm – 6:00 pm | Brad Long |
| 6:00 pm – Midnight | Neil Johnson/David Mackay |

On Saturday mornings the station featured a 'buy, swap and sell' program where listeners would buy, swap or sell their personal items on the radio.

On Saturday afternoons, along with playing a hits format, announcers co-ordinated 3-state racing on-air along with local racing from race courses such as Clermont. Races were aired, totes were given by the announcer, and then the music format resumed until the next race was ready to be broadcast.

At midnight, the station closed down, and then restarted at 6am the following morning.

The next wave of announcers to join the station in 1982/83 included Ric Hose, Alf Smerdon, Chris Elliott.

== Today ==
Over the years, and the introduction of intense networking, 4HI became a one-announcer station. Today it only broadcasts a limited amount of weekday programming from the station's Emerald studio, including a three-hour breakfast show, hosted by Joel Reinke, and an hour-long lunchtime program. There is also sports-themed local programming on 4HI each Saturday morning.

The station relies heavily on nationally syndicated programming from 2GB in Sydney, such as the Ray Hadley Morning Show, the Ben Fordham highlights program and the Continuous Call Team.

4HI also airs a networked drive program each weekday afternoon from 3 pm which is broadcast across the Resonate Broadcasting network.

== Weekday program guide ==
| Time Slot | Program Name |
|---|---|
| 6 am to 9 am | The Brekky Show |
| 9 am to 11 am | The Ray Hadley Morning Show |
| 11 am to 12 pm | The Best of the Alan Jones Show |
| 12 pm to 1 pm | The 4HI Lunchbox Live and Rural News |
| 1 pm to 3 pm | The Chris Smith Afternoon Show |
| 3 pm to 6 pm | Drive |
| 6 pm to 8 pm | Money Matters with Ross Greenwood |
| 12 am to 5 am | Miners Overnight |

== Saturday program guide ==
| Time Slot | Program Name |
|---|---|
| 12 am to 5 am | Miners Overnight Weekends with James |
| 6 am to 11 am | The Saturday Breakfast Show with Cameron Stallard |
| 11 am to 12 pm | The Racing Show |
| 12 pm to 10 pm | Continuous Call Team |

== Sunday program guide ==
| Time Slot | Program Name |
|---|---|
| 9 am to 11 am | My Generation with Jonesy & Amanda |
| 12 pm to 6 pm | Continuous Call Team |
