= Hit102.5 Mt Isa =

hit102.5 Mt Isa
Mount Isa, Queensland, Australia; Australia
- Broadcast area: Mount Isa RA1 ()
- Frequency: 102.5 MHz FM
- Branding: Hot FM West Queensland

Programming
- Language: English
- Format: Top 40 (CHR)
- Affiliations: Hot FM

Ownership
- Owner: Southern Cross Austereo; (North Queensland Broadcasting Corporation Pty Ltd)

History
- First air date: 18 July 1993

Technical information
- ERP: 600 watts
- HAAT: 22 m
- Transmitter coordinates: 20°43′24″S 139°29′52″E
- Translator: 104.5 FM Cloncurry

Links
- Website: Official website

hit102.5 Mt Isa (ACMA callsign: 4MIC) is an Australian commercial radio station in Queensland. Owned and operated as part of Southern Cross Austereo's Hit Network, it broadcasts a contemporary hit radio format to Mount Isa and Cloncurry, Queensland. First broadcast in 1993, the station was branded as Hot FM until 2016 when it was rebranded to hit102.5

The Cloncurry translator was installed in 2012
