= Wesgo =

Australian radio broadcasting company

- Traded as: ASX: WSG
- Industry: Radio
- Founded: 14 October 1982
- Founder: 2WS; 2GO
- Defunct: 1995
- Headquarters: Sydney, Australia
- Net income: $7.7 million (1993/94)

Wesgo was an Australian media company that owned radio stations. It was founded on 14 October 1982 when radio stations 2WS in Sydney and 2GO in Gosford merged. In October 1987, eight stations were purchased from AWA making it the largest radio operator in Australia with 50 stations. In 1994 it was purchased by Australian Provincial Newspapers and delisted from the Australian Securities Exchange.

== Assets ==
Station	City	Notes
2AY	Albury	purchased October 1987
2GN	Goulburn	purchased October 1987
2GO	Gosford	
2CH	Sydney	purchased October 1987
2KO	Newcastle	
2SM	Sydney	purchased July 1992
2WS	Sydney	
Gold 104.3	Melbourne	purchased January 1995
Magic 693	Melbourne	
3BO	Bendigo	purchased October 1987, sold 1993
3GG	Warragul	60% purchased March 1990
4CA	Cairns	purchased October 1987, sold October 1990
4CC	Gladstone	purchased November 1995
4HI	Emerald	purchased March 1988, sold June 1988
4KQ	Brisbane	purchased April 1986
4LG	Longreach	purchased March 1988, sold June 1988
4MK	Mackay	sold October 1990
4TO	Townsville	purchased October 1987, sold October 1990
5KA	Adelaide	sold 1993
6KY	Perth	purchased October 1987
