= Resonate Broadcasting =

- Type: Private company
- Industry: Broadcast radio
- Founded: 2008
- Headquarters: Australia
- Key people: Jason Morrison; Geoff Speed
- Website: www.resonatebroadcasting.com.au

Resonate Broadcasting is an Australian media company, operating radio stations across various centres across regional Queensland, as well as Hawaii. Formed in 2008, it currently operates 16 radio stations across Australia and the United States.

== History ==
Resonate Broadcasting was founded in 2008 by Rex Morris and Guy Dobson. Morris was the group Program Director for Austereo's Triple M Network, based in Brisbane, while Dobson was Austereo's CEO. The first acquisitions were of three stations divested by Macquarie Media Group following its purchase of Southern Cross Broadcasting – 3GG Warragul, and 4GC and Hot FM Charters Towers. In July 2012, the stations were joined by two more, with 4LG and West FM in Longreach.

On 31 May 2012, the company acquired three radio stations in Hawaii from Chaparral Broadcasting – KHBC and KIPA in Hilo, and KHWI in Holualoa – through subsidiary Resonate Hawaii, LLC. KHBC and KWHI began simulcasting as adult top 40 The Wave @92FM, and in 2013 was joined by alternative rock 102.7 The Beach KTBH-FM.

After an attempted sale to Watermark Media fell through, in February 2015 3GG was acquired by the Capital Radio Network. On 30 October 2015, it was announced the company had acquired the assets of Macquarie Regional Radio, a subsidiary of Macquarie Radio Network, thereby adding eight stations to their network in Queensland.

== Assets ==
=== Resonate Regional Radio Network ===
Callsign	Frequency	Branding	Location	Format	Notes
4CCC	101.7 FM	West FM	Charleville, Queensland	Adult contemporary	
4CHT	95.9 FM	West FM	Charters Towers, Queensland	Contemporary hit radio	
4DB; 4EM	1629 AM; 1611 AM	Hot Country Radio	Dalby, Queensland; Emerald, Queensland	Country music	
4GC	828 AM	4GC	Charters Towers, Queensland	Classic hits	
4HI	1143 AM	4HI	Emerald, Queensland	Classic hits	
4LG	1098 AM	Outback Radio 4LG	Longreach, Queensland	Classic hits	
4LM	666 AM	4LM	Mount Isa, Queensland	Classic hits	
4LRE	104.5 FM	West FM	Longreach, Queensland	Adult contemporary	
4SB	1071 AM	4SB	Kingaroy, Queensland	Classic hits	
4VL	918 AM	4VL	Charleville, Queensland	Classic hits	
4ZR	1476 AM	4ZR	Roma, Queensland	Classic hits	

=== Resonate Hawaii, LLC ===
Callsign	Frequency	Branding	Location	Format	Notes
KHBC (FM)	92.7 FM	The Wave @92FM	Hilo, Hawaii	Adult top 40	
KHWI	92.1 FM	The Wave @92FM	Holualoa, Hawaii	Adult top 40	Simulcast of KHBC (FM)
KTBH-FM	102.7 FM	102.7 The Beach	Kurtistown, Hawaii	Alternative rock	

=== Former ===
Callsign	Frequency	Branding	Location	Format	Notes
3GG	531 AM	3GG	Warragul, Victoria	Adult contemporary	Sold to Capital Radio Network in 2015
