= Mix 94.5 =

Coordinates: 31°56′46″S 115°49′13″E

Mix94.5 (6MIX)
- Perth, Western Australia; Australia
- Frequency: 94.5 MHz FM (1991–present)

Programming
- Language: English
- Format: Adult contemporary; Hot adult contemporary
- Affiliations: Hit Network

Ownership
- Owner: Southern Cross Austereo
- Sister stations: Triple M

History
- First air date: 23 October 1941 (as 6KY); 1 June 1991 (as 6JKY); 1997 (as 6MIX)

Technical information
- Class: Commercial

Links
- Website: hit.listnr.com/perth/

Mix 94.5 (official call sign 6MIX) is a commercial FM radio station owned by Southern Cross Austereo in Perth, Western Australia, and is part of Southern Cross Austereo's Hit Network.

== History ==
The station originally began as 6KY, beginning broadcasting on 23 October 1941 on 1210 kHz and would eventually end up at the frequency 1206 kHz. The original building, at 17–19 James Street, East Perth, was the first building in Western Australia to be built specifically as a radio station. Consisting of five studios and an auditorium, the station was then owned by the Australian Workers' Union. The AWU later sold the station to STW Channel Nine, Perth, who later sold it to AWA. The radio station was employer of a significant number of notable Western Australian announcers, some being George Chapman, Norm Manners, Eric Fisher, Alan Robertson, Geoff Gregory, Paul Gadenne, Buddy Clarke, Greg King, Terry Olsen, Kim White, Peter Brunini, Jay Jay White, Dennis Cometti, Lionel Lewis, Geoff Bradley, Johnny Young, Peter Harrison, John Rohan, Grant Goldman, Sam West, Keith Harris, Ric Melbourne, Mike Gammon, MBR, Gary Shannon, Tom Needle, John Price, Bruce McKay, Ron O’Neill, Tony Doherty, Brian Taylor, Gordon O’Byrne, Howard Sattler, Murray Johnson, Alan Aitken, Eoin Cameron, Jenny Clemesha/Seaton, Peter Hale, Steve Curtis, Peter Newman. Gary Roberts, Earl Reeve, Jim Beam, Brian Lehmann, Ruth Elkes, Mike Parry, Grahame Cherry, Don Lunn. By 1987 it was owned by Wesgo. In December 1989, 6KY was sold to Jack Bendat.

=== FM era ===
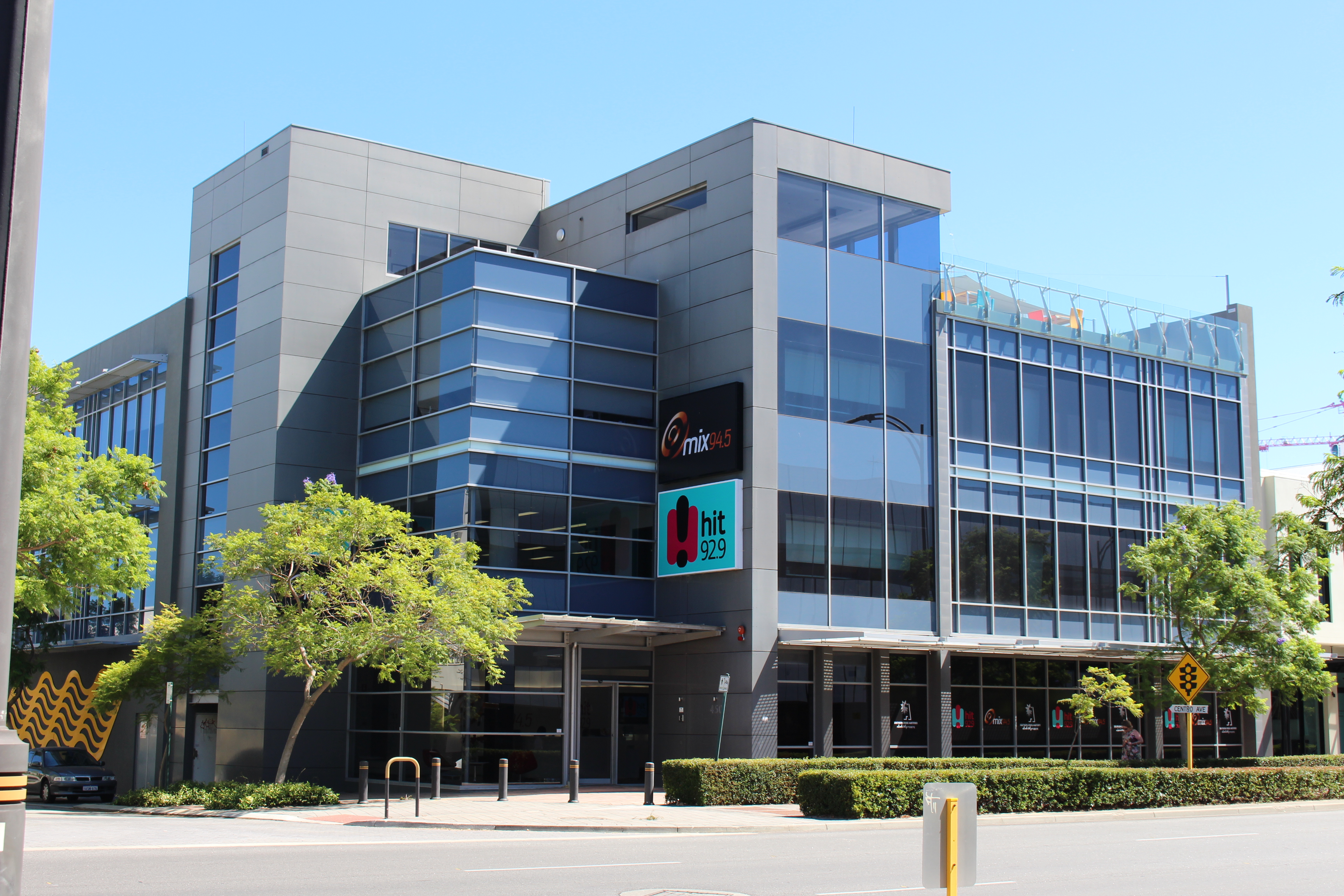
Mix94.5's broadcast centre in Subiaco, which also houses sister station Triple M Perth

On 1 June 1991, 6KY became one of two Perth radio stations to convert from the AM to FM bands. The station became known upon conversion to FM as 6KYFM, and later as 94.5 KYFM, with the official call sign 6JKY, as in Jack's KY a tribute to owner Jack Bendat, the transition from AM to FM under the General Management of Peter Perrin, was considered one of the most successful in Australia. The Perth conversion process was in fact the second round of auctions for that city as the first round was unsuccessful, leaving 96FM, the first and only commercial FM station in the city.

The on-air identity was later shortened to 94.5FM under the management of well-known Perth broadcaster Gary Roberts.

=== Late 1990s ===
Program Director during the mid to late 90s was Phil Lentz (formerly of 2SM Rock of the 80s). Phil also had a production background from his early days in the 1970s at 4BC. At 94.5, each announcer had his/her own individual EQ settings which Phil set using an EQ device built into the on-air studio.

By 1997, Phil formed the on air line up including:

Time	Show name
6:00 am – 9:00 am	Fred Bottica
9:00 am – 12:00 pm	Bob Stewart
12:00 pm – 3:00 pm	Anne-Marie
3:00 pm – 7:00 pm	David Kidd

Around 1998, it adopted the name Mix94.5.

=== The 2000s ===
In September 2005, Mix94.5 changed its logo from the red mix and the blue ball.

In March 2007, Mix94.5 and sister station 92.9 moved from the premises at 283 Rokeby Road, Subiaco to a new purpose-built broadcast centre at 450 Roberts Road, Subiaco.

The switch between Mix94.5's Rokeby Road studios and the new purpose-built broadcast centre in Roberts Road took place at 2 pm on 5 March. The first song played was "Friday on My Mind" by The Easybeats which was #43 in the "Top 294 Songs For Grown Ups" that Mix94.5 was playing across the long weekend.

In May 2009 the station began broadcasting its signal on Digital Radio as well. Perth was the first Australian city to switch the digital transmitters.

In December 2020, Mix94.5 joined the SCA Hit Network brand, replacing its sister station 92.9 who rebranded as Triple M. The official call sign is Mix94.5.

== Ratings ==
Mix94.5 has dominated radio ratings since the final survey of 1999.

In 2003, just after the arrival of Nova 93.7, there was a gradual decrease in listeners in the first half of the year. The 18–54 demographic was being targeted by local station 96FM and 720AM which lost Mix94.5 5.4% of listeners within this demographic. Despite this loss in the first half of 2003, Mix94.5 retained its presiding lead as the highest-rated radio station in Perth.

In 2006, in the second radio ratings survey of the year, Mix94.5 topped the survey as the most popular per-capita station in Australia.

Mix94.5 remained the most highly rated radio station in Perth for 12 and a half years, from 1999 to 2012. This dominant period culminated in the station winning its 100th consecutive radio ratings survey in May 2012.

In 2013, Mix94.5 proved its dominance again as it topped a number of categories in the first radio ratings survey of the year. It managed to knock off ABC's local Perth radio station as the No.1 breakfast radio station and also topped the drive time category, beating 92.9.
