= 4SB =

Australian radio station

Coordinates: 26°31′23″S 151°47′52″E

4SB is an Australian commercial radio station located in Kingaroy, Queensland.

== History ==
The South Burnett Broadcasting Company was formed in 1936 and announced their intentions to establish a radio station to serve the South Burnett, North Burnett and Mary Valley regions of Queensland, including the towns of Wondai, Murgon, Goomeri, Nanango, Esk, Crows Nest, Kilkivan, Eidsvold and Gayndah.

Prior to the local 4SB studios being finished, the station was opened as a relay station for 4BC on 11 March 1938 by James Hunter and Jim Edwards.

When construction of the studios was complete, 4SB was officially opened as Kingaroy's local radio station on 10 June 1938 by Harry Foll.

== Ownership ==
4SB has been owned by various companies over recent years.

The station is currently owned by Resonate Broadcasting and is part of the Resonate Regional Radio Network.

Resonate purchased the station in 2015 from the Macquarie Radio Network after a sale of the station was forced following the merger between Macquarie and Fairfax Radio.

Macquarie Regional Network acquired 4SB from the Smart Radio Group who sold 4SB and a number of other regional stations to Macquarie Regional Network in 2011.

Smart Radio Group purchased 4SB from Macquarie Regional RadioWorks in 2008 when a sale was forced when the company merged with Southern Cross Broadcasting, becoming Macquarie Southern Cross Media. Macquarie Regional Radioworks itself was formed after the merger of RG Capital and DMG Regional Radio which occurred in 2004.

== Programming ==
4SB broadcasts a combination of local, regionally networked and nationally syndicated programming.

A local breakfast show presented from 4SB's Kingaroy studio is followed by Rural Queensland Today program, presented from Brisbane.

Nationally syndicated programs on 4SB include The Ray Hadley Morning Show, The Alan Jones Show, Money News with Ross Greenwood and Nights with Steve Price.
