= Hit Network =

Australian radio network

- Type: Hot adult contemporary
- Country: Australia
- Broadcast area: Australia
- Headquarters: South Melbourne, Victoria

Programming
- Language: English

Ownership
- Owner: Seven Media Group

History
- Launch date: 1986
- Former names: Austereo Network; Today's Austereo Network; Today Network; Today's Hit Network

Links
- Website: hit.com.au

The Hit Network is an Australian commercial radio network owned and operated by Seven Media Group. The network consists of 41 radio stations broadcasting a hot adult contemporary music format, as well as 6 digital radio stations.

== History ==
The Hit Network was formed in 1986 as the Austereo Network after Austereo, the licensee of Adelaide commercial radio station SAFM, purchased Fox FM in Melbourne. The network grew throughout the late 1980s and the 1990s, acquiring B105 Brisbane, 2Day FM Sydney and PMFM Perth, as well as establishing joint-venture stations in Canberra and Newcastle. The network would later become known as the Today Network, with stations adopting a contemporary hit radio music format.

Following the acquisition of Austereo by Southern Cross Media Group, the company incorporated the regional Hot FM, Sea FM and Star FM networks into the Today Network.

In October 2014, Southern Cross Austereo announced it would relaunch SAFM in Adelaide as Hit 107, with a staggered network-wide relaunch announced in December. On 14 January 2015, the network was relaunched as Today's Hit Network, with the relaunch extending to Canberra in January 2016. Sea FM Hobart was relaunched as Hit100.9 in February, with the remaining network stations adopting the Hit Network branding as part of a national brand consolidation in December.

On 27 July 2020, the Hit Network was relaunched, adopting a new logo and "pop-based" music format in an attempt to target a 30–54 year old audience. In addition, Hit 105 Brisbane and Hit 107 Adelaide reverted to their heritage brands B105 and SAFM respectively. On 20 August 2020, Southern Cross Austereo announced the network would introduce statewide networked breakfast programs in New South Wales, Queensland and Victoria, replacing 19 local shows.

On 1 December 2020, Mix 94.5 Perth switched affiliation from the Triple M network to the Hit Network, with Hit92.9 relaunching as 92.9 Triple M.

== Stations ==
As of 1 January 2026, the Hit Network consists of 41 FM radio stations.

ACT

- hit104.7 Canberra

NSW

- 2Day FM 104.1 Sydney
- hit101.3 Central Coast
- hit105.9 Central West
- hit105.5 Coffs Coast
- hit102.3 & 105.1 Mid North Coast
- hit106.9 Newcastle
- hit93.1 Riverina
- hit99.7 Riverina MIA
- hit104.9 The Border

QLD

- B105 Brisbane
- hit103.5 Cairns
- hit Central Queensland
- hit100.7 Darling Downs
- hit94.7 Emerald
- hit101.9 Fraser Coast
- 90.9 Sea FM Gold Coast
- hit100.3 Mackay & the Whitsundays
- hit Maranoa
- hit102.5 Mount Isa
- hit89.1 South Burnett
- hit97.9 Tablelands
- hit103.1 Townsville

SA

- SAFM 107.1 Adelaide
- SAFM 96.1 Limestone Coast

TAS

- hit100.9 Hobart

VIC

- 101.9 The Fox Melbourne
- hit91.9 Bendigo
- hit Goulburn Valley
- hit 99.5 Sunraysia

WA

- Mix 94.5 Perth
- hit95.3 Albany
- hit101.3 Broome
- hit99.7 Carnarvon
- hit102.3 Esperance
- hit96.5 Geraldton
- hit97.9 Kalgoorlie
- hit106.5 Karratha
- hit Northwest
- hit91.7 Port Hedland
- hit Southwest
- hit Wheatbelt
- hit WA

== Network shows ==
- Pete & Kymba, Weekdays 6 am – 9 am*
- Jess & Rohan, Weekdays 6 am - 9am**
- Bel, Bernie & Emma G, Weekdays 6am - 9am***
- Carrie & Tommy, Weekdays 3 pm – 6 pm
- FIfi, Fev & Nick's Happy Hour, Weekdays 6 pm – 7 pm
- The Hot Hits with Nic Kelly and Loren Barry, Monday to Thursday 7 pm – 10 pm
- Lucy & Nikki, Friday 7 pm – 10 pm and Saturday 5 pm – 8 pm
- The Hot Hits with Nic Kelly and Loren Barry, Saturday 3 pm – 5 pm
- The Saturday Night Party Playlist, Saturday 9 pm – 12 am
- The Pulse with Seany B, Sunday 6 pm – 8 pm
- * Western Australia, External Territories only
- ** Tasmania, Regional VIC, Regional NSW, Regional QLD only
- *** South Australia only

== Local shows ==
2Day FM - Sydney

- 2Day FM Breakfast with Nath & Emma, Weekdays 6 am – 9 am

Fox FM - Melbourne

- Fifi, Fev & Nick, Weekdays 6 am – 9 am

B105 FM - Brisbane

- Stav, Abby & Matt, Weekdays 6 am – 9 am

SAFM - Adelaide

- Bel & Bernie, Weekdays 6 am – 9am

Hit104.7 - Canberra

- Wilko & Courts, Weekdays 6 am – 9 am

== Digital radio ==
As of April 2024, the Hit Network broadcasts an additional 6 radio stations on DAB+ digital radio and the LiSTNR app.

Years	Station	Format	Availability	History
2018–present	RnB Fridays	RnB music	Sydney, Melbourne, Brisbane, Perth and Adelaide	Formerly known as: – Urban Hits (2018–2021)
2019–present	Dance Hits	Electronic dance music	Sydney, Melbourne, Brisbane and Adelaide	
2023–present	Oldskool 80s Hits	1980s music	Sydney, Melbourne, Brisbane, Adelaide, Perth and Hobart	Formerly known as: – Easy 80s Hits [2020–2023] – Easy Hits Radio (Easy listening music from the 1980s, 1990s, 2000s, 2010s) [2016–2020] – Stardust Radio (Soft pop, jazz standards, beautiful music from the 1950s, 1960s) [2012–2016] Easy Hits was moved to the LiSNTR internet radio platform.
2020–present	Oldskool 90s Hits	1990s music	Sydney, Melbourne, Brisbane, Adelaide, Perth and Hobart	Formerly known as: – Oldskool Hits Radio (Hot adult contemporary music from the 1980s, 1990s, 2000s) [2016–2020] – More Digital (Music from the 1980s, 1990s) [2015–2016] – Loveland Radio (Love songs from the 1980s, 1990s, 2000s) [2012–2015]
2022–present	Blender Beats	Remixes and Mashups	Sydney, Melbourne, Brisbane, Adelaide, Perth	Replaced Buddha Hits [2012-2022] on DAB+ Buddha Hits was moved to the LiSNTR internet radio platform.
2024 - 2025	Easy Hits	Easy listening	Sydney, Melbourne, Brisbane, Perth and Adelaide	Relaunched on DAB+ replacing LiSTNR Radio In 2025 Heart* replaced Easy Hits

Choose The Hits was a station only broadcast on digital radio and ran between 1 February 2010 and 24 May 2010.

The Hit Network launched Caravan Radio on 24 May 2010. It was a "pop up" Digital Radio station that played the best bits from Hamish & Andy's Caravan of Courage journeys while they toured the United Kingdom on their fourth Caravan of Courage.

*Heart is a new DAB+ exclusive station targeted towards women aged 24-45 playing songs from the 70s to now. It also has no programmes/shows.

== See also ==
- List of radio stations in Australia
