= The Hot Hits (radio show) =

The Hot Hits is an Australian radio program hosted by Nic Kelly and Loren Barry. The show airs Monday to Thursday from 7:00 PM to 10:00 PM and Saturday from 3:00 PM to 5:00 PM. It is syndicated nationally on the Hit Network.

== History ==
=== Weekend Show ===
The Hot Hits was initially hosted by Kyle and Jackie O, who presented the program until 28 November 2009.

In November 2009, it was announced that Andrew Günsberg would succeed Kyle and Jackie O as the host of a revamped show, The Hot Hits Live from LA, broadcast from Los Angeles. Günsberg officially took over on 6 December 2009, alongside co-host Natalia Perez. The premiere featured guests Snoop Dogg and Jared Leto.

In December 2012, Günsberg announced his departure after three years with the show. In January 2013, Maude Garrett was announced as his replacement, with Dave Styles joining as co-host later that month.

In January 2015, Southern Cross Austereo announced the end of The Hot Hits Live from LA. The program was replaced by Planet Vevo, hosted by Dan & Maz.

After an eight-year hiatus, The Hot Hits returned to the Hit Network in February 2023, with Nic Kelly as the host.

=== Night Show ===
In January 2025, Southern Cross Austereo unveiled a new national Nights program, The Hot Hits with Nic & Loren, hosted by Nic Kelly and Loren Barry. The show will also air on Saturday between 3pm and 5pm.
