= 4ZR =

Australian radio station

Coordinates: 26.5719°S 148.7933°E

4ZR is an Australian commercial radio station located in Roma, Queensland.

The station broadcasts to the Maranoa Region on 1476 AM and provides a streams live on its website.

4ZR was officially opened on 23 July 1937 by Attorney-General, Robert Menzies.

The station is currently owned by Resonate Broadcasting. Resonate purchased 4ZR in 2015, along with a number of other regional Queensland stations that were formerly part of the Macquarie Radio Network. Due to a merger between Macquarie and Fairfax Radio, the stations were offloaded in compliance with ACMA regulations.

Programming on 4ZR is made up of a combination of locally presented shows, regionally networked programs such as Rural Queensland Today, and nationally syndicated talk shows from capital cities such as those presented by Ray Hadley, Alan Jones and Steve Price.
