= RadioWest =

- Australia
- Broadcast area: Western Australia
- Frequency: Various

Programming
- Format: Adult contemporary

Ownership
- Owner: Southern Cross Austereo

History
- First air date: Early 1990s

Links
- Website: www.radiowest.com.au

RadioWest was a group of 11 AM stations across the southern half of Western Australia playing 'Real Music Variety', and targeting the 35+ audience. On 15 December 2016, the network was rebranded Triple M as part of a nationwide move by parent company Southern Cross Austereo to bring all its radio brands into line. Formed in the early 1990s, it was once previously owned by DMG Radio. Most programming was local to each market with some network input from the RadioWest Network studios in Bunbury, Gold Coast or Albury.

6TZ Bunbury, 6NA Narrogin and 6CI Collie (Now 6TZ/T 1134) formed the radio division of the Golden West Network until 1988.

== Stations ==
- 6TZ 963 kHz, 2 kW Bunbury commenced 1939
- 6CI 1134 kHz, 2 kW Collie commenced 1947
- 6TZ 756 kHz, 2 kW Busselton commenced 1995
- 6BY 900 kHz, 2 kW Bridgetown commenced 1953
- 6VA 783 kHz, 2 kW Albany commenced 1956
- 6WB 1071 kHz, 2 kW Katanning commenced 1936
- 6NA 918 kHz, 2 kW Narrogin commenced 1951
- 6AM 864 kHz, 2 kW Northam commenced 1934
- 6MD 1098 kHz, 2 kW Merredin commenced 1941
- 6KG 981 kHz, 2 kW Kalgoorlie commenced 1931
- 6SE 747 kHz, 5 kW Esperance commenced 1982
