= Southern Cross Austereo =

Australian media company

- Type: Subsidiary
- Industry: Broadcast radio network
- Founded: 2004; 22 years ago
- Headquarters: Melbourne, Victoria, Australia
- Key people: Jeff Howard (CEO); John Kelly (Managing Director – Audio)
- Parent: Seven Media Group
- Website: www.sevenmediagroup.com.au

Southern Cross Media Group Limited, trading as Southern Cross Austereo (SCA), is an Australian media company and the country's largest radio broadcaster. The company operates 86 radio stations nationwide, including the Triple M and Hit Network brands, and owns the LiSTNR digital audio platform. Following the completion of its merger with Seven West Media on 7 January 2026, Southern Cross Austereo became part of the combined Seven Media Group.

Headquartered in South Melbourne, Victoria, the company was founded in 2004 as a subsidiary of Macquarie Bank to acquire regional radio assets. It expanded into television broadcasting in 2007 through the acquisition of Southern Cross Broadcasting, although it has since exited television operations. The company continues to operate its national radio and digital audio businesses through Triple M, Hit Network and LiSTNR.

== History ==
=== 2004–05: RG Capital & DMG Regional Radio acquisitions ===
RG Capital was an Australian radio company, formed in 1995 by Reg Grundy with the acquisition of Sea FM Gold Coast. Between 1996 and 2000, the group grew to 28 stations across regional centres, and was subsequently floated on the Australian Securities Exchange. On 3 June 2004, Macquarie Bank announced it would acquire RG Capital for $173 million, gaining control of 36 radio stations in New South Wales, Queensland, Victoria and Tasmania. The Federal Court of Australia approved the acquisition in August 2004, with the stations to be operated through the company's Regional Media Limited subsidiary, trading as Macquarie Regional RadioWorks. The acquisition was finalised on 1 September 2004.

On 3 September 2004, Macquarie Bank announced its acquisition of DMG Radio Australia's regional radio assets. The $193.5 million deal included 57 regional stations, with DMG retaining Hot 91.1 Sunshine Coast and Star 104.5 Gosford alongside its metropolitan assets. This increased Regional Media's reach into South Australia and Western Australia, initially controlling 93 radio stations and becoming the largest commercial radio network in Australia. However, as the Broadcasting Services Act 1992 prevents companies from controlling more than two commercial radio stations in a regional market, Regional Media was required to divest radio stations in Albury, Cairns, Mackay, Rockhampton/Gladstone and Townsville. On 1 September 2005, 2AY Albury was acquired by Ace Radio, while six stations in the remaining five markets were sold to Prime Television.

On 17 November 2005 the company was restructured into a triple-stapled structure consisting of an Australian-based private company and trust, and an additional private company based in Bermuda. Macquarie Media Group was in turn publicly listed on the Australian Securities Exchange, but with majority control retained by Macquarie Bank. In December, Macquarie Bank announced an AU$1.19 billion deal to acquire a 40% stake in Taiwanese cable television provider Taiwan Broadband Communications from equity firm the Carlyle Group, 60% of which would be financed by Macquarie Media Group. In March 2008, the company divested its stake to the Macquarie Korea Opportunities Fund in a $400 million deal.

=== 2006–08: American Consolidated Media & Southern Cross acquisitions ===
By 2006, Macquarie Regional RadioWorks was increasingly networking news and programming on its 86 radio stations from a series of hubs in Bendigo, Bunbury, the Gold Coast and Townsville. This was criticised by a number of politicians, including Nationals MPs Paul Neville and Barnaby Joyce. In response, the Minister for Communications Helen Coonan introduced the Broadcasting Services Amendment (Media Ownership) Act 2006, including requiring each commercial radio licence to produce 4.5 hours of 'locally significant' content each business day commencing from 1 January 2008. This was later relaxed to 3 hours for most stations, with exemptions for smaller stations.

In November 2006, Macquarie Media Group purchased a 13.8% stake in Southern Cross Broadcasting, acquiring 10 million shares for AU$195 million. On 25 January 2007, the company's interests expanded into the United States, with the acquisition of newspaper publisher American Consolidated Media for US$80 million (AU$102 million).

On 3 July 2007, Macquarie Media Group announced a takeover bid of Southern Cross Broadcasting, offering AU$17.41 per share for a total value of $1.35 billion. Under the deal, Macquarie would assume Southern Cross Broadcasting's regional television assets – Southern Cross Television, affiliated with the Seven Network; Southern Cross Ten, affiliated with Network Ten; and Tasmanian Digital Television, a joint-venture with WIN Corporation. Its remaining assets, including metropolitan radio stations, Satellite Music Australia and Southern Star Group, were to be onsold to Fairfax Media for AU$520 million. In return, Macquarie would acquire nine regional radio stations from Fairfax – three in Queensland: 4BU and Hitz FM Bundaberg and River 94.9 Ipswich; and six in South Australia: 5AU and Magic 105.9 Port Augusta, 5CC and Magic 89.9 Port Lincoln, and 5RM and Magic 93.1 Renmark. The Australian Communications & Media Authority gave prior approval to the deal, with the caveat that 12 radio stations currently controlled by Macquarie would be sold pursuant to the Broadcasting Services Act 1992. On 17 October, the Australian Competition & Consumer Commission approved the deal, but ruled that the deal for Fairfax to sell nine radio stations to Macquarie would result in a "substantial lessening of competition".

On 5 November, Macquarie Media Group acquired Southern Cross Broadcasting, selling its non-television assets to Fairfax Media the following day. On 12 December, both parties abandoned negotiations for the South Australian and Queensland radio stations. On 14 March 2008, Macquarie divested 18 radio stations for AU$34.5 million. Nine Tasmanian stations were sold to Grant Broadcasters, with four Queensland stations sold to Smart Radio. 4AM Atherton was bought by Coastal Broadcasters Pty Ltd, owners of 4KZ and Kool FM Innisfail, while 3GG Gippsland and 4GC and Hot FM Charters Towers were sold to Resonate Broadcasting, a new entity formed by Austereo executives Guy Dobson and Rex Morris. While only one of Macquarie's two stations in Young, New South Wales were required to be sold, both 2LF and Star FM were sold to Broadcast Operations Group.

Following the Southern Cross Broadcasting acquisition, Macquarie's regional radio and television business commenced trading as Macquarie Southern Cross Media.

=== 2009–10: Restructure ===
In August 2009, Macquarie Media Group posted a loss of $84.6 million in 2008-09, compared with a $273 million profit in the previous financial year. Despite lower revenue, the Group's Australian assets delivered a profit of $123.4 million, but ACM significant losses

In December 2009, MMG security holders voted in favour of a conversion from a triple-stapled structure to a single ASX-listed company. MMG was renamed Southern Cross Media Group with former RG Capital Radio CEO Rhys Holleran as the Chief Executive Officer.

=== Austereo ===
Austereo Group logo used until July 2011

The company was founded by Paul Thompson, and when commercial FM broadcasting was introduced into Australia it acquired the licence for metropolitan Adelaide, South Australia; SAFM commenced transmission in September 1980. The next station to join the network was Fox FM in Melbourne, Victoria in 1986, eventually to be followed by 2Day FM in Sydney, New South Wales and 4BK in Brisbane, Queensland for which the company was successful in converting to the FM band in 1990. Austereo also purchased AM radio station 6IX in Perth, Western Australia with the intention of converting the station to FM. 6IX, which had been re-launched by Austereo as The Eagle 1080 AM, was consequently sold off after being outbid for either of the two new FM licences by rivals 6KY and 6PM, which Austereo now own.

1995 saw a monopolistic arrangement take place whereby Village Roadshow purchased the Hoyts owned Triple M network, and Triple M in turn merged with Austereo to form a single umbrella company. The merger was part of a single deal that was unpopular due to the fierce rivalry between the two radio networks, and the fact that Village Roadshow and Hoyts were also direct competitors in the film industry.

=== Merger ===
In March 2011, Southern Cross Media launched an A$714 million takeover bid of national radio broadcaster, the Austereo Group. On 6 April 2011 shareholders of the Austereo Group accepted the takeover bid, giving SCM a more than 90% share in the company. Southern Cross Media and Austereo merged in July 2011 to form Southern Cross Austereo.

=== Post-merger ===
==== 2010s ====
Starting from 7 November 2011, Southern Cross Austereo slowly rolled out 9Gem, 9Go!, 7two, 7mate and 10 Drama as digital channels across the GTS/BKN areas.

On 23 August 2012, Guy Dobson (director of metro radio) was announced as Chief Officer of Content for the Southern Cross Austereo network, working across radio and television.

Southern Cross began broadcasting the shopping channel TVSN, already carried by Network 10, in December 2012 on LCN 54 in Southern Cross Ten markets, on LCN 64 in Tasmania and on LCN 74 in Darwin.

Southern Cross began broadcasting its own datacast channel, Aspire TV on 21 May 2013 on LCN 56 in Southern Cross Ten markets, on LCN 66 in Tasmania and on LCN 76 in Darwin.

On 7 December 2013, the company switched GDS/BDN to a feed of NWS Adelaide.

In October 2014, the company announced it would relaunch SAFM in Adelaide as Hit 107, with a staggered Hit Network-wide relaunch announced in December. On 14 January 2015, the network was relaunched as Today's Hit Network, with the relaunch extending to Canberra in January 2016. Sea FM Hobart was relaunched as Hit100.9 in February, with the remaining network stations adopting the Hit Network branding as part of a national brand consolidation in December.

Southern Cross began broadcasting Racing.com on 29 August 2015, the same day the channel was officially launched, in Seven-affiliated markets on LCN 68 in Tasmania, Broken Hill and the Spencer Gulf and on LCN 78 in Darwin.

In March 2016, gaming news publisher Press Start was acquired by Southern Cross Austereo, which resulted in its founder and owner Shannon Grixti being appointed as managing director of Press Start starting on 27 March 2016. Grixti launched Press Start in early 2014 and the acquisition was completed on 8 June 2016.

On 29 April 2016, Southern Cross Austereo announced that it had signed a five-year affiliation deal with Nine Entertainment Co., owner of the Nine Network, for almost $500 million, taking the place of WIN Television as the primary regional Nine affiliate. On 1 July 2016, Southern Cross switched its primary affiliation from Network Ten to the Nine Network and Nine's metropolitan branding was introduced across Southern Cross' television assets in Queensland, Southern NSW and Victoria, joining its existing Nine affiliate station in Spencer Gulf, SA and Broken Hill, NSW. Southern Cross' Northern NSW station, NRN, was not part of the deal as the Nine-owned NBN Television already operated in the region.

Upon the affiliation change, the channel listing for Southern Cross' Nine-affiliated stations was reshuffled with Nine on channel 5 and 51, 9HD on channels 50, 9Gem on channel 52 in standard definition, 9Go! on channel 53, 9Life on channel 54 and Aspire TV on channel 56. GDS/BDN Spencer Gulf/Broken Hill remained unchanged with Nine on channel 8, 9Gem on channel 80 and 9Go! on channel 88. As a result TVSN stopped broadcasting in the Nine-affiliated markets and was replaced with a To Be Advised slide until being replaced with Yesshop on 1 August 2016.

Due to the need to import and install the required equipment, Southern Cross originally stated that it would not immediately offer Nine's digital services 9HD and 9Life upon the transition; the broadcaster stated that they planned to begin transmitting them by mid-August—a delay which would have caused the third match of the 2016 State of Origin series on 13 July to not be transmitted in high definition in the affected regions—which includes parts of the New South Wales and Queensland regions who play the series. However, on 24 June 2016, Southern Cross Austereo announced that it had been "working tirelessly to get HD to air as quickly as possible", and 9HD became available from launch day on channel 50. The same approach also prompted 9Life to return early on 17 July 2016.

Southern Cross announced on 25 July 2016 that it would broadcast the New Zealand-based home shopping channel Yesshop as a datacast service, on the company's stations. The channel became available on 1 August 2016 in Queensland, Southern NSW, ACT and Victoria on LCN 55; Northern NSW, Spencer Gulf and Broken Hill on LCN 54; Tasmania on LCN 64 and Darwin on LCN 74. However, Yesshop's owner (Yes Retail) made the decision to cease trading on 29 September 2016 citing lack of funds to pay wages and the company's current losses of approximately 20 million dollars. Employees were terminated the same day, and the channels were removed on Freeview later that day.

In November 2016, Southern Cross Austereo signed a long-term contract with PodcastOne to launch a localised version of the online podcast service, rebranded as PodcastOne Australia. The service launched sometime in early 2017.

In December 2016, the company lodged a planning application with the ACT Government to demolish the CTC studios, administration and playout facility at Watson to make way for a residential development. The proposed studio campus demolition comes just over a year after WIN Television closed its Canberra studios at Kingston, moving its offices to the industrial suburb of Fyshwick. The trend of vast television estates making way for residential developments has been seen in Sydney, Melbourne and Perth. In 2009 however, a planned redevelopment of the original ATV studios at Nunawading in Melbourne was cancelled due to a slump in property prices.

In March 2017, Southern Cross Austereo announced that it would be launching a high definition simulcast of its main Seven-affiliated channel, Southern Cross HD in Tasmania on digital channel 60, in time for the first match of the 2017 AFL season later that month. Although SCHD launched in Tasmania on 22 March 2017 (whilst downgrading 7mate to standard definition on digital channel 63), it only began broadcasting Channel 7 programming in native high definition from 19 June 2018.

Following months of negotiations, Southern Cross Austereo finalised an agreement on 28 March 2017 to sell their Ten-affiliated Northern NSW station, NRN, to WIN Television for a total of $55 million, with the sale taking effect on 31 May 2017. Due to operational logistics, WIN did not commence broadcasting their identity to the NRN market until 1 September 2017. This sale relieved Southern Cross of their only sole Ten-affiliated station, with their remaining Ten affiliate, SGS/SCN operating in the Spencer Gulf/Broken Hill region where Southern Cross holds monopoly ownership of all three network affiliates.

On 17 July 2017, Southern Cross Austereo launched American religious channel SonLife Broadcasting Network (SBN), owned by evangelist Jimmy Swaggart, as a datacast service. The channel is broadcast in regional Queensland, Southern NSW & ACT, and regional Victoria on channel 55 as well as Spencer Gulf in South Australia, and Broken Hill in New South Wales on channel 54. Despite this, SBN never launched in Northern NSW, because NRN was already owned by WIN at the time. The above list is via Southern Cross' 10-affiliated and then Nine-affiliated stations, and in Tasmania on channel 64 and Darwin on channel 74 via Southern Cross' Seven affiliate stations.

From 1 July 2018, all local branding was phased out on all of Southern Cross Austereo's Seven-affiliated stations in favour of a generic Seven Network branding. Though news services offered by Southern Cross were also scheduled to be rebranded as Seven News on this date, the rebrand was delayed until further notice, citing concerns from Seven about using their news brand but not under their editorial control.

In September 2018, Southern Cross Austereo announced it would transfer its Canberra-based broadcast playout to NPC Media, a joint venture between the Nine and Seven Networks. CTC, via Southern Cross Austereo, would move remaining employees to a leased office facility in Canberra. The changes were expected to be completed by 30 June 2020.

On 30 September 2018, Southern Cross Austereo launched 9Life, in Tasmania, via TDT, and in the Spencer Gulf and Broken Hill regions, via GDS/BDN.

Southern Cross Austereo launched 7HD in Darwin on 26 November 2018.

On 3 December 2018, the Tasmanian station's news bulletin changed its title to Nightly News, followed on 14 January 2019 by GTS/BKN's bulletin. Around the same time, studio production for the Spencer Gulf edition of Nightly News was relocated from Southern Cross' Canberra headquarters to TNT's Hobart studio.

Southern Cross Austereo launched a refreshed logo on 1 July 2019.

==== 2020s ====
In March 2020, Southern Cross Austereo launched 7HD, 9HD and 10 HD, in the Spencer Gulf/Broken Hill areas, via the stations GTS/BKN, GDS/BDN, and SGS/SCN, as well as making 7mate, 9Gem, and 10 Bold all SD channels, to accommodate the aforementioned HD channels. This is the list of the changes that happened on 19 March 2020: 7HD launched on LCN 60, 7mate moved to LCN 63 from LCN 60 and became a SD channel, the main Seven channel became available on both LCN 6 and 61, 10 HD became available on LCN 50, 10 Peach moved to LCN 53 from LCN 55, 10 Bold moved to LCN 52 from LCN 50 and became a SD channel, and the main 10 channel became available on both LCN 5 and 51. Southern Cross Austereo's Nine channel changes occurred sometime in late March 2020, here is the list of changes that happened to GDS/BDN in March 2020: 9HD became available on LCN 80, the main Nine channel became available on both LCNs 8 and 81, 9Go! moved to LCN 83 from LCN 88, and 9Gem moved to LCN 82 from LCN 80 and it became a SD channel.

In March and April 2020, Southern Cross Austereo outsourced their television play out to NPC Media.

On 27 July 2020, Southern Cross Austereo relaunched the Hit Network, adopting a new logo and "pop-based" music format in an attempt to target a 30–54 year old audience. In addition, Hit 105 Brisbane and Hit 107 Adelaide reverted to their heritage brands B105 and SAFM respectively. On 20 August 2020, Southern Cross Austereo announced the network would introduce statewide networked breakfast programs in New South Wales, Queensland and Victoria, replacing 19 local shows.

In August 2020, demolition of the entire CTC and Southern Cross Austereo studio site at Watson was completed to make way for a housing development. The demolition marked the end of 46 years as Canberra's home of television and Australia's first colour television station.

On 1 December 2020, Southern Cross Austereo switched the affiliation of Mix 94.5 in Perth from the Triple M network to the Hit Network, with Hit92.9 relaunching as 92.9 Triple M.

On 18 February 2021, SCA launched LiSTNR, which would incorporate the rebranded PodcastOne Australia, as well as their existing digital audio content in live streaming radio. SCA continued its partnership with the American PodcastOne with both companies sharing their content.

On 12 March 2021, Nine announced that it would return to WIN Television as its regional affiliate in most markets beginning on 1 July 2021, in a deal that would last at least seven years. This has ended SCA's five-year agreement with the Nine Network. On 25 June 2021, SCA and Network 10 announced a two-year affiliation deal in regional Queensland, Southern NSW and regional Victoria, which introduced 10 Shake into regional areas for the very first time and it broadcasts on Channel 54, as well as Sky News Regional which launched on 1 August 2021 and it broadcasts on Channel 56. On SCA's 10 stations, Aspire TV ceased to broadcast on 31 July 2021, to accommodate Sky News Regional.

On 16 August 2022, SCA converted 7two, 7mate, 10 Bold, and 10 Peach, from the MPEG-2 format to the MPEG-4 format in the Tasmania market.

SCA extended the affiliation deal with 10 to 31 December 2023, on 27 June 2023.

SCA began broadcasting 10's datacast channel, Gecko, on 1 July 2023, on LCN 57, in Southern NSW, the ACT, Regional Victoria, Regional Queensland, Broken Hill, and Spencer Gulf, and on LCN 67 in Tasmania.

==== Proposed acquisition by ARN Media ====
In October 2023, ARN Media alongside private equity firm Anchorage Capital Partners made a non-binding indicative offer to acquire 100% of the fully diluted share capital of the company. This comes after ARN acquired a 14.8% stake in SCA in June. Under the proposed sale, the KIIS Network would have remained with ARN, while the Triple M network would have joined ARN. The Hit and Pure Gold networks, SCA's TV stations and LiSTNR would have been purchased by Anchorage. The deal collapsed after Anchorage withdrew.

==== Exit from television ====
On 17 December 2024, Southern Cross Austereo announced the sale of their regional television licenses in Regional Queensland, Southern NSW/ACT and Regional Victoria to Network 10. As part of the sale, SCA will receive a share of profits from the stations for the first 5 years post-completion. The sale was completed on 1 March 2025.

On 27 February 2025, Southern Cross Austereo announced the sale of their remaining regional television licenses to Australian Digital Holdings. By that May, the deal had fallen through and it was announced that Seven West Media would instead acquire the remaining television stations from SCA for $3.75 Million. The sale of these stations to Seven West Media was finalised on 1 July 2025, marking SCA’s exit from television.

==== Merger with Seven West Media ====
Following Seven West Media’s acquisition of SCA’s remaining television assets in July 2025 and SCA’s exit from television, Seven and parent company Southern Cross Media announced their intention to merge by early 2026. The merger was completed on 7 January 2026. Seven West Media’s CEO Jeff Howard is to lead the merged companies as CEO and Manager Director.

In October 2026, Southern Cross Austereo announced it would rebrand as Seven Media Group, bringing to a close the longstanding SCA and Austereo names and marking the end of a significant chapter in Australian media history.

== Brands ==
=== Radio ===
The format of each station is defined by one of two common formats:

- Hit Network – plays adult hit music from the 1980s, 1990s, 2000s, 2010s and today targeted at those aged between 25 and 54 years old using various brands in metropolitan and regional areas
- Triple M Network – talkback and rock music format targeted at adults over 39, mainly on the AM and heritage FM stations

Agreements were reached between Southern Cross Austereo, DMG and ARN Media to ensure that existing brand names owned by DMG Radio in regional markets could continue to be used by both Southern Cross Austereo and ARN.

== Programming ==
=== Radio ===
Southern Cross Austereo produces its own networked programming across both brands, which include:

Network	Show name	Announcer/s	Description
Hit	Carrie & Tommy	Carrie Bickmore and Tommy Little	Afternoon program
Hit	The Hot Hits	Nic Kelly & Loren Barry	Night program

Some of its stations picked up the Continuous Call Team when Broadcast Operations Group could not resolve broadcast rights issues with 2GB and the National Rugby League. The most notable was Triple M Newcastle, who also picked up rights to cover games of the Newcastle Knights.

=== Television news (prior July 2025) ===
Prior to SCA selling its off its television stations in July 2025, the network produced regional television news services for its stations affiliated with the Seven Network and Network 10. Full evening news programs aired in Tasmania and the Spencer Gulf and Broken Hill region (until 2023) with short updates airing in remote Central and Eastern Australia, Darwin, Southern NSW & ACT, Victoria, Queensland and Tasmania.

On 3 December 2018, the Tasmanian station's news bulletin changed its title to Nightly News, followed on 14 January 2019 by GTS/BKN's bulletin. Around the same time, studio production for the Spencer Gulf edition of Nightly News was relocated from Southern Cross' Canberra headquarters to TNT's Hobart studio.

In 2019, Southern Cross Austereo shifted the Spencer Gulf and Broken Hill bulletin to 7two at 7:00 pm rather than airing on the main channel.

In May 2021, SCA reached a content agreement with Sky News Australia, under which it would distribute the new free-to-air Sky News Regional beginning 1 August 2021. The service is a de facto replacement for the Sky News on WIN service that it previously distributed.

Following the switch back to Network 10 affiliation on 1 July 2021, Southern Cross returned to producing local news updates on their 10 stations after a five-year absence. The updates carry the 10 News First branding and are produced out of the networks Launceston (QLD updates) and Hobart (Southern NSW and VIC updates) studios. The Southern NSW and Canberra updates are presented by Ruby Cairns, the Regional Queensland updates are presented by Daniel Pizarro, and the Regional Victoria updates are presented by Kasey Wilkins. The updates, which typically don't include any corresponding news footage or soundbites, are researched, produced and presented by a single journalist. Fill-in presenters include Will Boddy, Rebecca Gaitaneris, Philippa Christian and Madeline Kerr.

On 13 April 2023, Southern Cross Austereo cancelled the GTS/BKN bulletin, effective immediately. It is believed that some staff were not informed that the program would be aired for the last time that night until after it went to air. It ends over 50 years of news operations for the Spencer Gulf and Broken Hill regions, and leaves viewers with no local television news service.

== Assets ==
=== Radio ===
==== Queensland ====
Licence area	Stations that are part of the Hit Network	Stations that are part of the Triple M Network
Atherton	4AMM "Hit 97.9 Tablelands" (97.9 MHz FM)	
Brisbane	4BBB "B105 Brisbane" (105.3 MHz FM)	4MMM "Triple M Brisbane" (104.5 MHz FM)
Bundaberg		4RGB "Triple M Bundy" (93.1 MHz FM)
Cairns	4HOT "Hit103.5 Cairns" (103.5 MHz FM)	4RGC "Triple M Cairns" (99.5 MHz FM)
Emerald	4HIT "Hit94.7 Emerald" (94.7 MHz FM)	
Gold Coast	4SEA "Hit 90.9 Gold Coast" (90.9 MHz FM)	4GLD "Triple M Gold Coast" (92.5 MHz FM)
Kingaroy	4KRY "Hit89.1 South Burnett" (89.1 MHz FM)	
Mackay	4MKY "Hit100.3 Mackay and the Whitsundays" (100.3 MHz FM)	4RGM "Triple M Mackay and the Whitsundays" (98.7 MHz FM)
Maryborough	4CEE "Hit101.9 Fraser Coast" (101.9 MHz FM)	4MBB "Triple M Fraser Coast" (103.5 MHz FM)
Mount Isa	4MIC "Hit102.5 Mount Isa" (102.5 MHz FM)	
Rockhampton	4ROK "Hit Central Queensland" (107.9 MHz FM)	4RGK "Triple M Central Queensland" (101.5 MHz FM)
Roma	4ROM "Hit95.1 Maranoa" (95.1 MHz FM)	
Toowoomba/Warwick (Darling Downs)	4RGD "Hit100.7 Darling Downs" (100.7 MHz FM)	4GR "Triple M Darling Downs" (864 kHz AM)
Townsville	4TSV "Hit103.1 Townsville" (103.1 MHz FM)	4TOO "Triple M Townsville" (102.3 MHz FM)

==== New South Wales ====
Licence area	Stations that are part of the Hit Network	Stations that are part of the Triple M Network
Albury^{1}	2AAY "Hit104.9 The Border" (104.9 MHz FM)	2BDR "Triple M The Border" (105.7 MHz FM)
Coffs Harbour	2CSF "Hit105.5 Coffs Coast" (105.5 MHz FM)	2CFS "Triple M Coffs Coast" (106.3 MHz FM)
Dubbo	2DBO "Hit91.1 Dubbo" (91.1 MHz FM)	2DUB "Triple M 93.5 Dubbo" (93.5 MHz FM)
Gosford (Central Coast)	2CFM "Hit 101.3 Central Coast" (101.3 MHz FM)	2GGO "Triple M Central Coast" (107.7 MHz FM)
Griffith	2RGF "Hit99.7 Riverina MIA" (99.7 MHz FM)	2RG ""Triple M Riverina MIA" (963 kHz AM)
Kempsey^{2} (Mid-North Coast)	2ROX "Hit105.1 Mid North Coast" (105.1 MHz FM)	2PQQ "Triple M Mid North Coast" (106.7 MHz FM)
Newcastle	2XXX "Hit106.9 Newcastle" (106.9 MHz FM)	2KKO "Triple M Newcastle" (102.9 MHz FM)
Orange	2GZF "Hit105.9 Central West" (105.9 MHz FM)	2OAG "Triple M Central West" (105.1 MHz FM)
Sydney	2DAY "2Day FM Sydney" (104.1 MHz FM)	2MMM "Triple M Sydney" (104.9 MHz FM)
Wagga Wagga	2WZD "Hit93.1 Riverina" (93.1 MHz FM)	2WG "Triple M Riverina" (1152 kHz AM)

1. Translators for 2BDR on 90.1 MHz in Omeo and 96.5 MHz in Corryong. There is also a translator for 2AAY in Corryong on 95.7 MHz.
2. Translators on 100.7 MHz (2PQQ) and 102.3 MHz (2ROX) in Port Macquarie.

==== Australian Capital Territory ====
Licence area	Stations that are part of the Hit Network	Stations that are part of ARN's KIIS Network
Canberra	1ROC "Hit104.7 Canberra" (104.7 MHz FM)	1CBR "Mix 106.3 Canberra" (106.3 MHz FM)

==== Victoria ====
Licence area	Stations that are part of the Hit Network	Stations that are part of the Triple M Network
Bendigo	3BDG "Hit91.9 Bendigo" (91.9 MHz FM)	3BBO "Triple M Bendigo" (93.5 MHz FM)
Melbourne	3Fox "Fox FM Melbourne" (101.9 MHz FM)	3MMM "Triple M Melbourne" (105.1 MHz FM)
Mildura	3MDA "Hit99.5 Sunraysia" (99.5 MHz FM)	3RMR "Triple M Sunraysia" (97.9 MHz FM)
Shepparton	3SUN "Hit96.9 Goulburn Valley" (96.9 MHz FM)	3SRR "Triple M Goulburn Valley" (95.3 MHz FM)
Warragul (Gippsland)		3SEA "Triple M Gippsland " (94.3 MHz FM^{1})

1. Re-transmitter at 97.9 MHz FM in Traralgon.

==== Tasmania ====
Licence area	Stations that are part of the Hit Network	Stations that are part of the Triple M Network
Hobart	7TTT "Hit 100.9 Hobart" (100.9 MHz FM)	7XXX "Triple M Hobart" (107.3 MHz FM)

==== South Australia ====
Licence area	Stations that are part of the Hit Network	Stations that are part of the Triple M Network
Adelaide	5SSA "SAFM Adelaide" (107.1 MHz FM)	5MMM "Triple M Adelaide" (104.7 MHz FM)
Mount Gambier	5SEF "SAFM Limestone Coast" (96.1 MHz FM)	5SE "Triple M Limestone Coast"(90.5 mhz fm

==== Western Australia ====
Licence area	Stations that are part of the Hit Network	Stations that are part of the Triple M Network
Albany	6AAY "Hit106.5 Karratha" (106.5 MHz FM)	6VA "Triple M Karratha" (783 kHz AM)
Bridgetown	6BET "Hit Southwest" (100.5 MHz FM)	6BY "Triple M Southwest" (900 kHz AM)
Broome	6HED "Hit101.3 Broome" (106.5 MHz FM)	6NWR "Triple M Broome" (102.9 MHz FM)
Bunbury	6BUN "Hit" (101.3 MHz FM)	6TZ "Triple M Southwest" (963 kHz AM)^{1}
Carnarvon	6CAR "Hit99.7 Carnarvon" (99.7 MHz FM)	6LN "Triple M Carnarvon" (666 kHz AM)
Esperance	6SEA "Hit102.3 Esperance" (102.3 MHz FM)	6SE "Triple M Esperance" (747 kHz AM)
Geraldton	6GGG "Hit96.5 Geraldton" (96.5 MHz FM)	6BAY "Triple M Geraldton" (98.1 MHz FM)
Kalgoorlie	6KAR "Hit97.9 Goldfields" (97.9 MHz FM)	6 kg "Triple M Goldfields" (981 kHz AM)
Karratha	6RED "Hit106.5 Karratha" (106.5 MHz FM)	6KA "Triple M Karratha" (102.5 MHz FM)
Katanning	6KAN "Hit94.9 Great Southern" (94.9 MHz FM)	6WB "Triple M Great Southern" (1071 kHz AM)
Merredin	6MER "Hit105.1 Central Wheatbelt" (105.1 MHz FM)	6MD "Triple M Central Wheatbelt" (1098 kHz AM)
Narrogin	6NAN "Hit100.5 Great Southern" (100.5 MHz FM)	6NA "Triple M Great Southern" (918 kHz AM)
Northam	6NAM "Hit96.5 Avon Valley" (96.5 MHz FM)	6AM "Triple M Avon Valley" (864 kHz AM)
Perth	6MIX "Mix 94.5" (94.5 MHz FM)	6PPM "Triple M Perth" (92.9 MHz FM)
Port Hedland	6HED "Hit91.7 Port Hedland" (91.7 MHz FM)	6NW "Triple M Port Hedland" (94.1 MHz FM)
Remote Western Australia	6FMS "Hit WA"	6SAT "Triple M WA"

1. 6TZ also re-transmitted via 1134 kHz AM in Collie (6CI, now listed by the Australian Communications & Media Authority under 6TZ), and 756 kHz AM in Busselton and the Margaret River region.

=== Digital radio ===
Southern Cross Austereo broadcasts a number of digital only radio stations, including:

- Santa Radio (seasonal): first launched for Christmas 2020, billed as a partnership between SCA and North Pole communications playing festive songs picked by Santa and his elves
- Blender Beats: pop, dance, RNB, electro hits mash ups by DJs
- Buddha: "pop, electronica and acoustic vibes with a café music feel"
- Oldskool 80s Hits: up-tempo, sing-along format of mainstream 1980 hits
- RnB Fridays: hip-hop and RnB
- Dance Hits: dance tunes
- Oldskool 90s Hits: pop nostalgia, focused around the 1990s
- Kids Hits: kids' music and overnight lullabies
- SoundCloud Radio: up and coming and independent artists, in partnership with SoundCloud
- Triple M 90s: 1990s rock music
- Triple M Classic Rock: late 1960s and 1970s
- Triple M Hard 'N' Heavy: metal and hard rock
- Triple M Country: country music from the 1990s to now
- Triple M Soft Rock: soft rock
- Heart
- Heart Hits
- Heart 60s

In 2021 Southern Cross Austereo announced it has invested in content discovery company Sonnant, to add metadata to their digital content

=== Internet radio ===
Southern Cross Austereo broadcasts a number of internet radio stations on the LiSTNR platform. The launch of LiSTNR in February 2021 consisted of 15 music stations initially, with plans to add more stations and shows in the future.

Station Name	Launch date	Genre
Almost Acoustic	February 2021; 5 years ago	Easy chillout, pop, rock, country
Blender Beats	February 2021; 5 years ago	Pop, Hip-hop, R&B, 2000s, Dance, Electronica
Cover Up	February 2021; 5 years ago	Pop, 2000s, 90s, 80s
Fit Hits	February 2021; 5 years ago	Pop, Dance, Electronica
Good Vibes	February 2021; 5 years ago	Easy chillout, 2000s, 90s
Heart Breakers	February 2021; 5 years ago	Easy chillout, 80s, 90s, Love songs
Homegrown	February 2021; 5 years ago	New music, Rock, Pop, Australian music
Karaoke Stage	February 2021; 5 years ago	Pop, 70s, 80s, 90s, 2000s
Latino	February 2021; 5 years ago	Pop
Noughties	February 2021; 5 years ago	2000s
Rock 'n' Road Trip	February 2021; 5 years ago	Rock
Stress Free	February 2021; 5 years ago	Easy chillout
Top 30	February 2021; 5 years ago	Chart hits, New music
Trending Now	February 2021; 5 years ago	New music, Chart hits
Yacht Rock	February 2021; 5 years ago	Rock, 70s
Jazz	July 2021; 5 years ago	Jazz
Girl Power	July 2021; 5 years ago	Pop, 2000s, 90s, Chart hits
Crooners & Swooners	July 2021; 5 years ago	Jazz
70s Hits	July 2021; 5 years ago	70s, Rock, Pop, Chart hits
Kids Hits	July 2021; 5 years ago	Kids
80s New Wave	July 2021; 5 years ago	80s, Chart hits
Indigenous	July 2021; 5 years ago	Indigenous, Hip-hop, R&B, Pop
90s Soft Pop	July 2021; 5 years ago	90s, Pop, Chart hits
Guilty Pleasures	July 2021; 5 years ago	Chart hits, 90s
Indie & Alt	July 2021; 5 years ago	Rock, New music, Pop
Sound States – Sleep	May 2022; 4 years ago	Ambient
Sound States – Focus	May 2022; 4 years ago	Ambient
Sound States – Focus (Brown Noise Only)	May 2022; 4 years ago	Ambient
2010s	July 2022; 4 years ago	Chart hits, 2010s
Hard N Heavy (previously Triple M Hard N Heavy on DAB+ digital radio from 2019 to 2022)	November 2022; 4 years ago	Hard rock
Buddha (previously Buddha Hits on DAB+ digital radio from 2012 to 2022)	December 2022; 3 years ago	Easy listening, Chillout
Chill Pop Hits	March 2023; 3 years ago	Soft pop, Easy listening
Mushroom 50 (in collaboration with Mushroom Records)	2023; 3 years ago	Indigenous, 80s, 90s, Rock, Australian music
Heart	October 2025; 1 year ago	Easy listening
Heart Hits (previously Easy Hits on DAB+ digital radio from 2016 to 2023)	October 2025; 1 year ago	Easy listening, 2000s, 90s, 80s
Heart 60s (previously 60s Hits on DAB+ digital radio from 2022 to 2025)	October 2025; 1 year ago	Easy listening, 60s, Rock, Pop
K-Pop	2025	K-Pop, Pop, Global
Chill Electronic	2025	Dance & Electronica, Chill
Run Club	2025	House, Workout
Lofi Study Beats	2025	Lo-fi music, Mood, Wellbeing
Pride	2025	Pop, Chart Hits
Essential Emo	2025	Rock, Indie, Alternative
Fresh Folk Hits	2025	Country, New Music, Indie, Alternative
RnB Chill	2025	Hip-Hop & RnB, Chill
Billion Streams Club	2025	Pop, Chart Hits
Rap Revolution	2025	Hip-Hop & RnB, New Music
Aussie Hip Hop	2025	Australian Music, Hip-Hop & RnB, Mood
Punjabi Icons	2025	Global, Mood, Hip-Hop & RnB
Coastal Drive	2025	Mood, Chill
Hot Country	2025	Chart Hits, Country
2020's	2025	Decades
Yeah The Girls	2025	Mood, Pop, Chart Hits
On Tour	2025	Chart Hits
Rock 101	2025	Mood, Rock
Pop UK	2025	Chart Hits, Pop

=== Podcasts ===
SCA's LiSTNR app hosts selected PodcastOne podcasts from the US as well as many locally-produced podcasts, including content from Hamish Blake, Dylan Alcott, Christopher Pyne, Rosie Waterland, and others.

The Briefing is a news podcast featuring presenters and journalists such as Sacha Barbour Gatt, Chris Spyrou, Natarsha Belling, Helen Smith and Antoinette Lattouf.

== Advertising sales ==
As well as advertising sales for all their own assets, SCA were also in charge of advertising for the Nine owned and operated station NBN from 1 July 2018, until the advertising sales were sold to WIN on 1 July 2021 and then Nine Entertainment on 1 July 2022.

== Former assets ==
=== Radio ===
Due to conditions placed upon the takeover of DMG Radio's regional stations in 2005, Macquarie Southern Cross Media had to sell these stations to other parties:

- To ARN Media (with most stations being rebranded as "Zinc"):
  - 4CA, Cairns
  - Sea FM and Mix-FM, Townsville
  - 4MK, Mackay
  - 4RO, Rockhampton
  - 4CC, Rockhampton/Gladstone
- To Ace Radio:
  - 2AY, Albury–Wodonga

Further, due to conditions triggered by the purchase of the assets of Southern Cross Broadcasting, Macquarie Media Group was required to sell further stations to meet further diversity requirements at the time; the transactions to satisfy this being completed on 14 March 2008:

- To Grant Broadcasters:
  - Launceston, Tasmania: 7LA (1098 kHz AM)
  - Burnie, Tasmania: 7BU "Heart 558" (558 kHz AM), 7SEA "Sea FM" (101.7 MHz FM)
  - Scottsdale, Tasmania: 7SD "Heart 540" (540 kHz AM), 7RGS "Sea FM" (99.7 MHz FM)
  - Devonport, Tasmania: 7AD "Heart 900" (900 kHz AM), 7DDD "Sea FM" (107.7 MHz FM)
  - Queenstown, Tasmania: 7XS "West Coast 7XS" (837 kHz AM), 7AUS "Aus FM" (92.1 MHz FM)
- To Resonate Broadcasting:
  - Warragul, Victoria: 3GG (531 kHz AM)
  - Charters Towers, Queensland: 4GC (828 kHz AM), 4CHT "Hot FM" (95.9 MHz FM)
- To Smart Radio/Pinecam Pty Ltd (owners of the 4VL licence in Charleville, Queensland):
  - Emerald, Queensland: 4HI (1143 kHz AM)
  - Kingaroy, Queensland: 4SB "Heart 1071" (1071 kHz AM)
  - Mount Isa, Queensland: 4LM (666 kHz AM)
  - Roma, Queensland: 4ZR (1476 kHz AM)
- To Broadcast Operations Group:
  - Young, New South Wales: 2LF (1350 kHz AM), 2LFF "Star FM" (93.9 MHz FM)
- To Coastal Broadcasters Pty Ltd (owners of the 4KZ licence in Innisfail, Queensland):
  - Atherton, Queensland: 4AM (558 kHz AM)

Southern Cross Austereo was made to sell 91.9 Sea FM and 92.7 Mix FM on the Sunshine Coast, due to the larger than allowed overlap between the stations' licence area and that of Brisbane. In 2013, the two stations were sold to Eon Broadcasting.

=== Television ===
In autumn 2017, Southern Cross Austereo sold their 10-affiliated Northern NSW station, NRN, to WIN Television for a total of $55 million, following months of negotiations. In 2025, Southern Cross Austereo sold its owned and operated regional television stations to the 10 Network and Seven West Media. The sale also included its share in several jointly owned television stations.

==== New South Wales and the Australian Capital Territory ====
- BDN – Nine Broken Hill¹
- BKN – Seven Broken Hill¹
- SCN – 10 Broken Hill¹
- CTC – 10 Canberra and Southern New South Wales

==== Northern Territory and Remote Areas of Eastern Australia ====
- Central Digital Television (CDT) – 10 Central (jointly owned with Imparja Television Pty Ltd)²
- DTD – 10 Darwin (jointly owner with the Nine Network)²
- QQQ – Seven Central
- TND – Seven Darwin

==== Queensland ====
- IDQ – 10 Mount Isa (jointly owned with Imparja Television Pty Ltd)²
- ITQ – Seven Mount Isa
- TNQ – 10 Regional Queensland

==== South Australia ====
- GDS – Nine Spencer Gulf¹
- GTS – Seven Spencer Gulf¹
- SGS – 10 Spencer Gulf¹

==== Tasmania ====
- TDT – 10 Tasmania (jointly owned with WIN Television)²
- TNT – Seven Tasmania

==== Victoria ====
- GLV – 10 Gippsland
- BCV – 10 Bendigo

1. Southern Cross had a monopoly on commercial television in this market at time of sale. The services other than GTS and BKN are retransmissions from Adelaide with local advertising.
2. This station was launched as a digital-only service, co-owned by the two existing commercial broadcasters in the market.

== Controversies ==
=== Ownership and control ===
On 16 February 2006, the Australian Communications & Media Authority commenced an investigation into the ownership of radio stations by Elmie Investments, owned by Stuart Simpson. The investigation revealed that Macquarie Regional RadioWorks had funded $9 million of Simpson's $10 million acquisition of five radio stations from AMI Radio. The radio stations in question – EasyMix Ten-71 Bendigo and EasyMix 1467 Mildura in Victoria, 4EL Cairns and 4AA Mackay in Queensland and, in Western Australia, Easy Mix 621 Bunbury – were located in markets where RadioWorks already controlled two commercial radio licences, and in November 2007 the company was found to be in breach of sections 54 and 56 of the Broadcasting Services Act 1992. The stations had been divested from Elmie Investments before the conclusion of the investigation.

=== Kyle & Jackie O child rape victim incident ===
In 2009, 2Day FM were ordered to provide increased protection for children after a 14-year-old girl was attached to a lie detector on the Kyle and Jackie O Show and pressured into discussing her sex life live on air. The radio show host, Kyle Sandilands, encouraged both the girl and her mother to discuss whether she was sexually active, to which the girl responded: "I've already told you the story of this and don't look at me and smile because it's not funny. Oh, okay. I got raped when I was 12 years old." To which Kyle replied: "Right. And is that, is that the only experience you've had?"

=== Summer 30 royal hoax call incident ===
As part of a hoax call to the King Edward VII's Hospital Sister Agnes treating the wife of Prince William for acute morning sickness in the critical first trimester of pregnancy, 2Day DJs – Mike Christian and Mel Greig – purported to be the Queen and the Prince of Wales. An experienced 46-year-old nurse, Jacintha Saldanha, took the call. During the call, she and colleagues were conned into revealing sensitive details regarding the patient's condition.

The nurse was found dead the following morning in a suspected suicide at the hospital where she worked.

There is some disagreement over the legality of the incident, with the hospital expressing concern that the incident may have broken the law and Rhys Holleran, the chief executive of 2Day FM's parent company Southern Cross Austereo, stating he was confident that was not the case.

At a Federal Court hearing, it became known that Australian media watchdog Australian Communications and Media Authority (ACMA) had prepared a confidential, preliminary report saying that the Radio Royal hoax 'broke law'. 2Day FM acted illegally by airing the phone call without consent.

== See also ==
- Seven (Southern Cross Austereo)
- 10 (Southern Cross Austereo)
- Hit Network
- Triple M
- RadioWorks
- American RadioWorks
