= Star FM (Australia) =

- Australia
- Broadcast area: New South Wales; Victoria; South Australia
- Frequency: Various

Programming
- Format: Top 40 (CHR)

Ownership
- Owner: Southern Cross Austereo

Links
- Website: www.starfm.com.au

Star FM was an Australian radio network, consisting of Top 40/CHR formatted stations in New South Wales, Victoria and South Australia. The brand was created by DMG Regional Radio in 1999, with the network being sold to Southern Cross Austereo.

== Programming ==
The network's stations are aimed at the under-35 section of the market, playing Top 40 and popular music. For most stations, the only local program heard on these stations is the breakfast programme, with Alo Baker's Workday networked from the Gold Coast Media Centre, and drive/nights programming coming from Southern Cross Austereo's metropolitan stations Fox FM in Melbourne and 2Day FM in Sydney.

In 2007, Star FM changed its major positioning statement from "Todays Best Music" to "Your HIT Music Station". The positioning statement was changed again in June 2011 to "Your #1 HIT Music Station" and following the Southern Cross Media/Austereo merger and became "Fresh & First" in 2013 until recently it was changed again to "Hits & Old Skool"

On 15 December 2016, all stations that are a part of the Hit Network were rebranded as Hit, meaning that the Star FM and Hot FM brandings ceased to exist.

== Stations ==
=== New South Wales ===
- 2AAY 104.9 MHz Albury
- 2CSF 105.5 MHz Coffs Harbour
- 2DBO 93.5 MHz Dubbo
- 2GZF 105.9 MHz Orange
- 2RGF 99.7 MHz Griffith
- 2ROX 105.1 MHz Kempsey/102.3 MHz Port Macquarie
- 2WZD 93.1 MHz Wagga Wagga

=== Victoria ===
- 3BDG 91.9 MHz Bendigo
- 3MDA 99.5 MHz Mildura
- 3SEA 94.3 MHz and 97.9 MHz Gippsland (formerly Sea FM)
- 3SUN 96.9 MHz Shepparton (formerly Sun FM)

=== South Australia ===
- 5SEF 96.1 MHz Mount Gambier
