= 4VL =

Charleville, Queensland, Australia; Australia
- Broadcast area: Charleville RA1 ()
- Frequency: 918 kHz AM

Programming
- Language: English
- Format: Classic hits
- Affiliations: Macquarie Radio Network

Ownership
- Owner: Resonate Radio
- Sister stations: West FM

History
- First air date: 12 February 1936
- Call sign meaning: 4 – Queensland; CharleViLle

Technical information
- Power: 2.5 kW (Daytime); 2 kW (Nighttime)
- Transmitter coordinates: 26°24′16″S 146°14′39″E

Links
- Website: Official website

4VL is a radio station in Charleville, Queensland, Australia. It is owned by Resonate Radio along with other sister stations around Queensland. This company is owned by Rex Morris, Guy Dobson, Sally Dobson

The 4VL building located on Wills Street, Charleville also houses West FM, servicing the Great South West and Warrego Districts.

== Weekday Program Guide ==
Time Slot	Program Name
6 am to 9 am	The Live and Local Breakfast
9 am to 11 am	The Ray Hadley Morning Show
11 am to 12 pm	The Best of the Alan Jones Breakfast Show
12 pm to 1 pm	The National Rural News Hour
1 pm to 3 pm	The Chris Smith Afternoon Show
3 pm to 6 pm	Weekday Winddown with Gazza Sands
6 pm to 8 pm	Money Matters with Ross Greenwood
12 am to 5 am	Miners Overnight with James
