= Blyton Group =

Australian media and entertainment company

- Type: Privately held company
- Industry: Radio broadcasting, hospitality
- Founder: Kevin Blyton
- Headquarters: Jindabyne, New South Wales, Australia
- Area served: Australia
- Key people: Kevin Blyton, Lachlan Blyton-Gray, Lucy Blyton-Gray
- Divisions: Radio, Snow Resorts, Cinema, Airport, Theme Park
- Subsidiaries: Capital Radio Network

Blyton Group is an Australian media and entertainment company. The company primarily operates in the radio industry under its subsidiary Capital Radio Network and owns hospitality, service and entertainment businesses in New South Wales.

== History ==
The company was started by Kevin Blyton who first acquired a radio station 2XL in the Snowy Mountains and has since grown the radio network and expanded into hospitality. With the exception of XLFM, Snow FM and 3GG, all radio stations are operated as a 50/50 joint venture with Grant Broadcasters.

The group is led by a family-based leadership team, including Lachlan Blyton-Gray as the Chief Operating Officer and Lucy Blyton-Gray as the Chief Strategy Officer.

In 2020, Blyton Group announced a 10-year master-plan for continued development of its Charlotte Pass Snow Resort, beginning with an upgraded chair lift.

In November 2021, Grant Broadcasters sold their wholly owned radio stations to ARN. Their share of Capital Radio Network stations and wholly owned Geelong stations K Rock and Bay 93.9 remained with the Grant Broadcasters' owners, the Cameron family.

Founder Kevin Blyton died on Sunday, 19 October 2025, at Cooma Hospital following a cardiac arrest.

== Radio Network ==
Operating under the name Capital Radio Network, the Blyton Group wholly owns three radio stations and has a joint venture with Grant Broadcasters for the remaining stations. The radio network operates in five locations across Australian Capital Territory, New South Wales, Victoria and Western Australia. The Snowy Mountains radio station organised the automated music for the Blyton Group's Magic Mountain amusement park speakers.

=== Wholly owned stations ===
- Snowy Mountains, New South Wales
  - XLFM
  - Snow FM
- Gippsland, Victoria
  - 3GG

=== Joint venture with Grant Broadcasters ===
- Australian Capital Territory
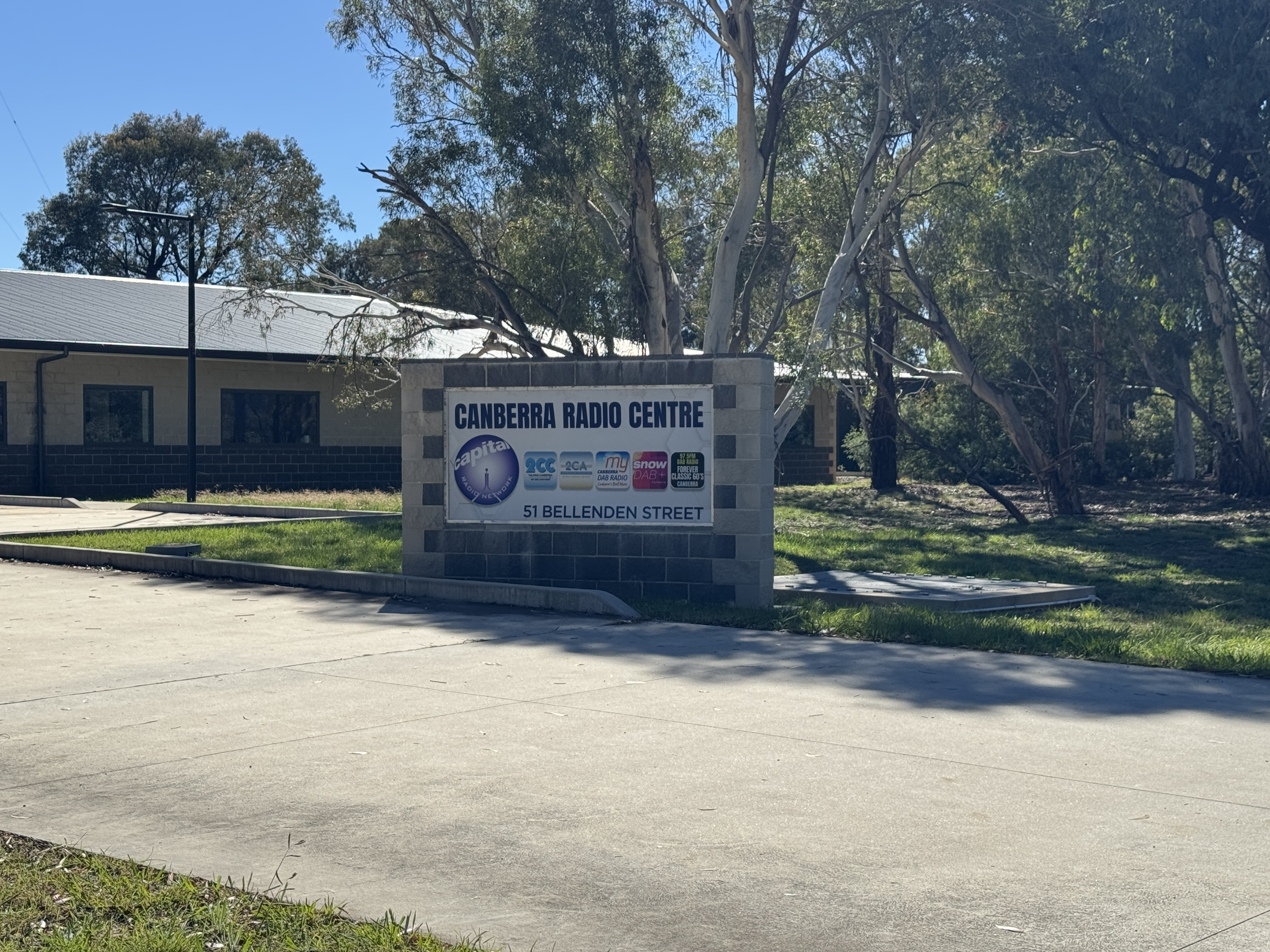
  Canberra Radio Centre, 51 Bellenden Street, Gungahlin
  - 2CC
  - 2CA
  - MyDAB Canberra
  - Snow FM (relayed from Snowy Mountains on DAB+)
  - KIX Country
- New South Wales
  - Southern Tablelands
    - GNFM
    - Eagle FM
    - KIX Country
  - Snowy Mountains
    - KIX Country
- Perth, Western Australia
  - 6IX
  - X Digital
  - KIX Country
  - MyDAB Perth

=== Former stations ===
In the 1990s, Kevin Blyton held a 40% stake in Newcastle's NXFM.

Outside of buying and selling stations in the same stations/territories as current stations, he has also held stations 7HT (Hobart), 7EX (Launceston) and 7XS (Queenstown) in Tasmania and owned Q92fm in Queenstown, New Zealand which he purchased in 1992.

== Hospitality and services ==
Blyton Group operates two snow resorts in the New South Wales Snowy Mountains region. The two resorts are Charlotte Pass Snow Resort and Selwyn Snow Resort.

The company also has multiple hotels as a part of their operations in the region:

- Kosciuszko Chalet Hotel, Charlotte Pass
- Lucy Lodge, Charlotte Pass
- Stillwell Hotel, Charlotte Pass

In the 2019-2020 Australian summer bushfires, the Selwyn Snow Resort burned down. In June 2023, Blyton Group reopened Selwyn Snow Resort to the public following a three year rebuild. Premier Chris Minns officially reopened the resort on 21 July 2023.

In addition to the resorts and hotels, the Blyton Group owns the Snowy Mountains Airport Corporation, which operates Cooma-Snowy Mountains Airport and as a part of their Charlotte Pass resort, operate an over-snow bus service linking the village to Perisher Valley.

== Entertainment ==
Group also operates the movie theatres in the Snowy Mountains townships of Jindabyne. In Merimbula, the Blyton Group own and operate the Magic Mountain amusement park.
