= GNFM =

Radio station in Goulburn, Australia

GNFM (2GBN)
- Goulburn, New South Wales; Australia
- Broadcast area: Southern Tablelands
- Frequency: 107.7 MHz
- Branding: Forever Classic

Programming
- Format: Classic hits

Ownership
- Owner: Capital Radio Network, Grant Broadcasters; (Radio Goulburn Pty Ltd)
- Sister stations: Eagle FM (Australia), XLFM, 3GG

History
- First air date: 7 December 1931
- Former call signs: 2GN
- Former frequencies: 1390 kHz (1931–1978); 1368 kHz (1978–2022)
- Call sign meaning: Goulburn

Technical information
- Licensing authority: Australian Communications & Media Authority
- ERP: 35 kW
- Transmitter coordinates: 34.75845°S 149.763111°E
- Repeaters: 106.1 MHz, Crookwell

Links
- Website: www.gnfm.com.au

GNFM (call sign 2GN) is an Australian radio station in Goulburn New South Wales that commenced broadcasting in January 1932 as 2GN on a frequency of 1390 kHz (1368 kHz between 1978 and 2022). Test broadcasting began on 7 December 1931. As at December 1989, it was owned by Wesgo.

It is now co-owned by the Capital Radio Network and Grant Broadcasters, broadcasting on 107.7 MHz. The station carries a Classic Hits format and Forever Classic branding similar to its sister stations, 2CA, 6IX, XLFM and 3GG. The station's studios are shared with sister station, Eagle FM.

GNFM has an FM repeater serving the township of Crookwell and re-transmitting GNFM on 106.1 MHz.

On 12 May 2022, the station transitioned to FM and it was renamed GNFM. On 28 May 2022, the AM signal on 1368 kHz broadcast a retune message telling listeners to tune to 107.7. This remained the case until the AM signal on 1368 kHz was switched off in June 2022. 2GN's former transmitter was demolished in October 2026.

== Programming ==
GNFM features both local programming and syndication. GNFM also features local news bulletins.

== Recognition ==
In the 2014 Commercial Radio Australia Awards (ACRA's), Craig Prichard won the award for 'Best Entertainment/Music Presenter: Country'.

In October 2019, it was announced that 2GN news reader Michael Prevedello had won the 2019 ACRA category for 'Best News Presenter: Country & Provincial'.

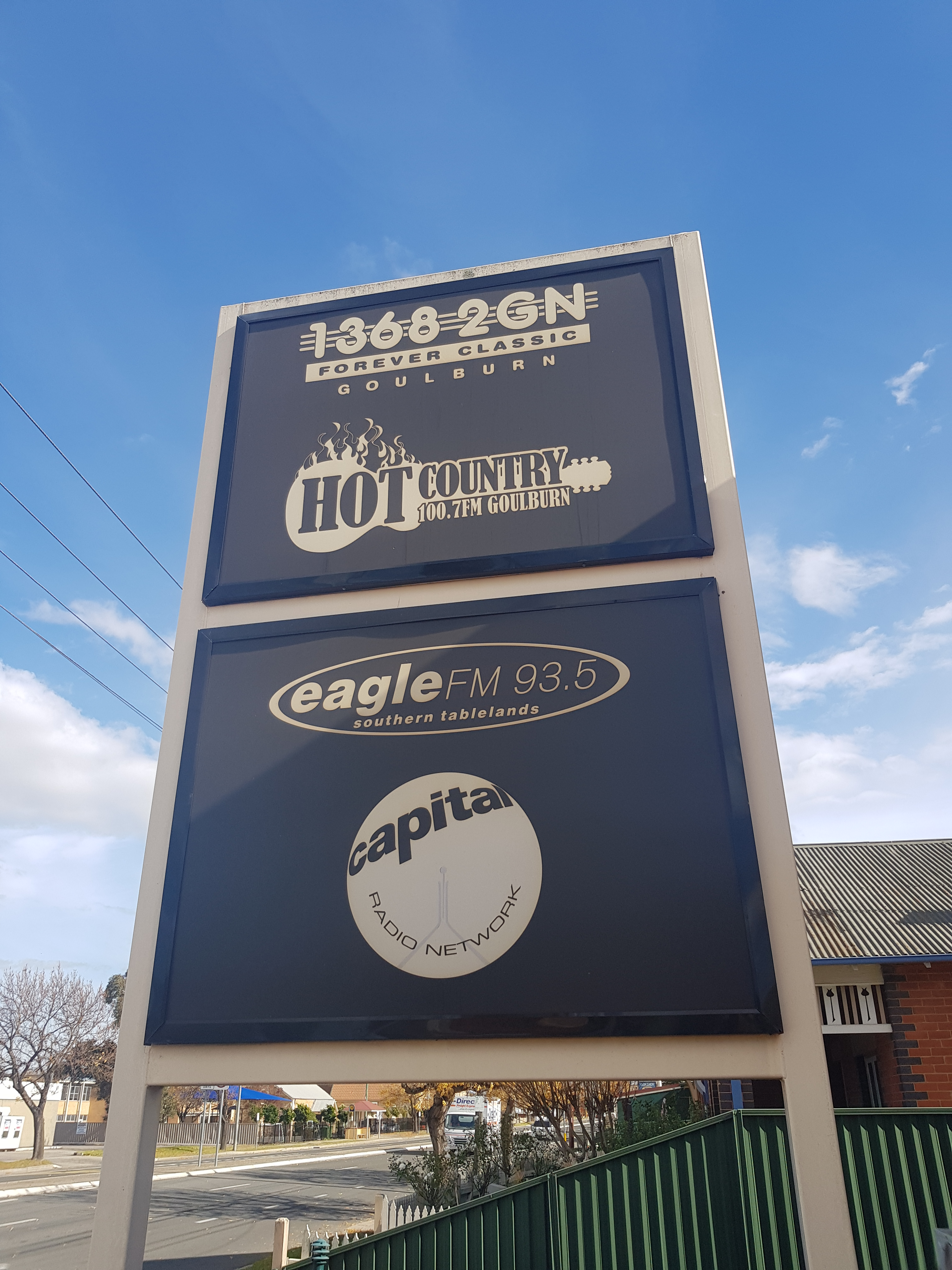
2GN's logo on the signage outside of the Goulburn Broadcasters building, alongside sister station Eagle FM and KIX Country

== Announcers ==
- Craig Prichard
- John Banks
- Gary Warne
- Andrew Deak
- Macka Dixon (Fills)

=== Former ===
- Aaron Chilcott (2026)
- Michael Prevedello (1973-1986; 2017-2022)
