= Snow FM =

2SKI
- Cooma, New South Wales; Australia
- Broadcast area: Snowy Mountains
- Frequency: 97.7FM
- Branding: Snow FM 97.7

Programming
- Language: English
- Format: Top 40/CHR

Ownership
- Owner: Capital Radio Network; (Radio Snowy Mountains Pty Ltd)
- Sister stations: XLFM, Eagle FM

Technical information
- Licensing authority: ACMA
- Transmitter coordinates: 36°14′12″S 149°07′32″E
- Repeaters: 94.7FM (Jindabyne); 92.9 FM (Thredbo); 101.9FM (Perisher Valley); 91.7FM (Charlotte Pass, Bombala); DAB+ Canberra

Links
- Public licence information: Profile
- Webcast: Listen live (via iHeartRadio)
- Website: www.snowfm.com.au

Snow FM (call sign: 2SKI) is a commercial radio station in New South Wales, covering the areas of Cooma, Jindabyne, Thredbo, Perisher Valley and Charlotte Pass. The station broadcasts on multiple frequencies to reach the townships within the Snowy Mountains region.

Snow FM services roughly 25,000 permanent residents, but also services the large number of tourists who visit the nearby ski resorts of Thredbo, Perisher, Charlotte Pass and Selwyn Snowfields.

Snow FM shares much of its branding, format and music with their Capital Radio Network sister station, Eagle FM, based in Goulburn.

In June 2015, Snow FM and XLFM (then 2XL), switched to the Zetta play out system, as Capital Radio Network continued to roll out the play out changes.

In July 2019, Snow FM commenced broadcasting into Canberra on DAB+ Digital Radio. The transmission is made through Capital Radio Network sister stations 2CC and 2CA.

== Current On Air Line-Up ==
As at November 2026 -

=== Weekdays ===
- 6:00am-10:00am: Breakfast with Jack Boyd & April Hammond
- 10:00am-1:00pm: Mornings with Jordan Bocock
- 1:00pm-5:00pm: Afternoons with Bec Kempin
- 5:00pm-7:00pm: Drive with Will McMahon & Woody Whitelaw
- 7:00pm-12:00am: Up All Night with Alfie Rowley

=== Weekends ===
- 6:00am-6:00pm: Rotating announcers

== Notable former announcers ==
- Ellie Mobbs (2Day FM)
- Andrew Dunkerley (Triple M, Mix 101.1, Mix 106.3, Mix 106.5)
- Jack Tree (Nova 106.9)
