= IHeartCountry Australia =

iHeartCountry Australia
- Bundaberg, Queensland, Australia; Australia
- Broadcast area: Regional Australia
- Frequencies: 87.6 MHz; 87.8 MHz; 88.0 MHz; other AM & FM freqs.
- Branding: iHeartCountry Australia

Programming
- Language: English
- Format: Country music

Ownership
- Owner: ARN; Grant Broadcasters & Capital Radio Network (Goulburn, Canberra, Perth)
- Sister stations: 4BU; Hitz939

History
- First air date: 30 June 2003
- Former names: KIX Country

Technical information
- Class: Narrowcast
- Power: LPON & HPON
- Repeater: see below

Links
- Website: www.iheart.com/live/iheartcountry-australia-7222/

iHeartCountry Australia is an Australian radio network broadcasting in various towns across the country. Its target demographic is all people who love country music. Launched on 30 June 2003, as KIX Country Radio, it is part of ARN. It is transmitted primarily via narrowcast stations of varying power. All bar three stations operate on the FM band.

The network is programmed out of Bundaberg, Queensland. Technical and engineering support is provided by affiliated local commercial radio stations in or near the broadcast area.

In April 2015, the Hot Country and Top Country branding was replaced by KIX, already used on stations in Queensland and South Australia.

In November 2021, KIX Country, along with other stations owned by Grant Broadcasters, were acquired by the Australian Radio Network. This deal will allow Grant's stations, including KIX Country, to access ARN's iHeartRadio platform in regional areas. The deal was finalized on 4 January 2022. The KIX Country stations in Canberra, Cooma, Goulburn, Jindabyne, and Perth owned by a 50 to 50 joint venture by Grant and Capital Radio Network are not part of the sale and will remain with Grant. It is unknown how the merger will impact KIX Country in regards to their branding.

On 23 October 2025, the network was rebranded as iHeartCountry Australia, which had previously existed only on DAB+ in the country.

== Frequencies ==
=== Australian Capital Territory ===
- 97.5FM / DAB+ Canberra

=== New South Wales ===
- 88.0FM Batemans Bay
- 88.0FM Bega
- 87.6FM Bermagui
- 1215AM Bowral
- 97.5FM Canberra^{1}
- 87.6FM Cooma^{1}
- 87.6FM Eden
- 100.7FM Goulburn^{1}
- 88.0FM Jindabyne^{1}
- 88.0FM Merimbula
- 87.6FM Muswellbrook
- 88.0FM Moruya
- 97.7FM Narooma
- 101.1FM Nowra
- 87.8FM Pambula
- 87.6FM Tamworth
- 105.3FM Wollongong

=== Victoria ===
- 89.3FM Geelong
- 88.0FM Swan Hill

=== Queensland ===
- 87.6FM 1770/Agnes Water
- 100.7FM Alpha
- 88.0FM Biloela
- 97.5FM Blair Athol
- 88.0FM Bundaberg
- 97.1FM Bundaberg
- 90.9FM Dysart
- 88.0FM Gladstone
- 92.3FM Hervey Bay
- 98.1FM Inglewood
- 101.9FM Injune
- 88.0FM Lowood
- 93.9FM Mackay
- 92.3FM Maryborough
- 94.1FM Middlemount
- 88.0FM Moura
- 92.7FM Rockhampton
- 92.1FM Saraji coal mine
- 94.7FM Surat
- 89.9FM Townsville
- 88.0FM Winton
- 96.1FM Yeppoon
- 89.5FM Yuleba

=== South Australia ===
- 90.5FM Barossa Valley
- 1557AM Berri
- 87.6FM Clare
- 87.6FM Port Lincoln
- 87.6FM Port Pirie

=== Western Australia ===
- DAB+ Perth^{1}
- DAB+ Mandurah

=== Tasmania ===
- DAB+ Hobart
- 95.3FM Queenstown

=== Northern Territory ===
- 92.3FM / DAB+ Darwin

^{1}Owned as part of a 50 to 50 joint venture with Grant Broadcasters and Capital Radio Network
