= Mark Levy =

Mark Levy may refer to:

- Mark I. Levy, American lawyer
- Mark Levy (rugby league), Australian rugby league player
- Mark Levy (reporter), American journalist
