= 4BU Radio Station building =

Historic radio station building in Bundaberg, Queensland, Australia

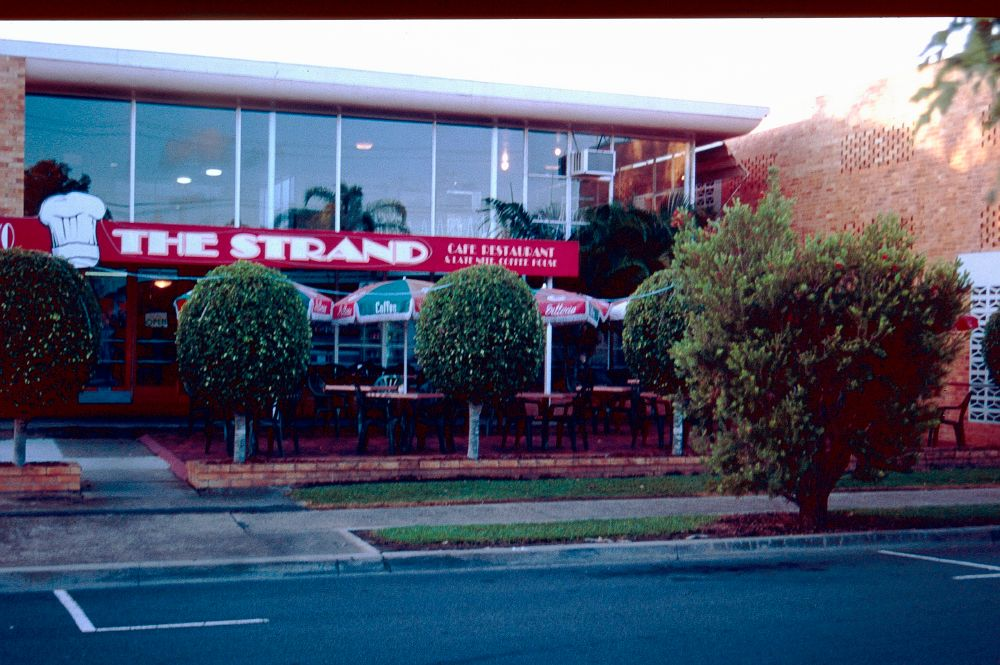
- 4BU Radio Station building, used as a restaurant, 1999

- Location within Queensland Location within Australia
- 24.8672°S 152.3483°E
- Location: 55 Woongarra Street, Bundaberg Central, Bundaberg, Queensland, Australia

History
- Design period: 1940s–1960s (post-World War II)
- Built: 1957

Site notes
- Architect: Herbert Stuart-Nairne
- Architectural style: Modernism

Queensland Heritage Register
- Official name: 4BU Radio Station (former), The Strand Cafe/Restaurant
- Type: state heritage (built)
- Designated: 28 July 2000
- Reference no.: 601284
- Significant period: 1957 (fabric); 1950s–1990s (historical, social)
- Significant components: safe, garage, steps/stairway, studio – artist's / craftsman's

4BU Radio Station is a heritage-listed former radio station building at 55 Woongarra Street, Bundaberg Central, Bundaberg, Bundaberg Region, Queensland, Australia. It was designed by Herbert Stuart-Nairne and built in 1957. It is also known as The Strand Cafe/Restaurant. It was added to the Queensland Heritage Register on 28 July 2000.

== History ==
The former 4BU building was constructed in 1957 to a design by architect, Herbert Stuart-Nairne.

Following a meeting in April 1935 at the offices of Wyper Bros. Ltd, the company of Bundaberg Broadcasters Pty Ltd was incorporated on 24 July in the same year. Broadcasting commenced on 16 December 1935, with a complement of seven advertisers and a PMG licence at a cost of £25. The chairman of directors, Mr W Harvey, along with the co-directors, Colonel Christensen and Mr R Curtis, adhered strictly to a policy catering for all tastes in entertainment.

The transmitter and studio equipment were purchased for just over £1500. The studios of 4BU were located in a building leased from Wyper Bros. Ltd. During World War II, regular programs for Bundaberg and district troops in New Guinea and adjacent islands were provided. In 1938, two acres of land was purchased at Kalkie for a fee of £50. Later that year a further area was purchased so that Bundaberg Broadcasters Pty Ltd could install an antenna, having received consent to increase power from 200 to 500 watts. This consent was given in 1937, a small fibro cottage was supplied for the engineer so that he could live on site and be on call should problems occur.

During the 1930s and for many years broadcasting consisted of live stage plays, revues and concerts. The new transmitter station opened at Kalkie in June 1938. In 1941, the lease for the studios was extended for a further three years and in May of that year the old piping was dismantled. Until 1939, power for transmitting was supplied by a generator owned by Bundaberg Broadcasters Pty Ltd. It was not until 25 May 1939 that power was connected to the Kalkie site from the city electricity supply. In December 1943, a further lease and an offer to purchase was placed on the studios. This building was known as "The Radio Building". As the industry of the wireless grew so 4BU followed suit. Prior to having their building constructed, 4BU rented premises from the Bundaberg City Council. With an ever-increasing listening audience and updates in technology, Bundaberg Broadcasters decided to construct a new building.

Designed by Herbert Stewart-Narine, who had also designed other Bundaberg buildings, including the fire station, the building was opened in 1957. Stuart-Nairne incorporated a number of very distinctive elements associated with 1950s architecture. Like many similar designs, both non-domestic and domestic, the building was designed with a flat roof, a distinct 1950s departure from the domination of buildings by roof forms. Brisbane architects, Hayes and Scott produced many houses that experimented with the composition of windows, fine detailing of glass up to roof line and exaggerated projection of roof line, to heighten the illusion of the flat roof floating. By 1948, the initial problems of gaining the confidence of builders had been solved, consequently, this paved the way for interesting variations of ceiling forms during the 1950s. Stuart-Nairne's use of floor to ceiling glass in the design of the former 4BU radio station is architecturally typical of this era.

The former 4BU radio station demonstrates the rediscovery of texture in the 1950s. Materials composed as textural decoration included using colour, art works, sunshading devices, grids, patterns and fragmented building components. Decorative, textural detail extant in the former 4BU radio station include the interior decorative features, particularly the undulating ceiling and geometric wall treatments in the former recording suites and the timber sunshading features on the western side of the building. The decorative elements epitomise the use of rationalised ornamentation incorporating a sense of logic so archetypal of the 1950s.

In 1993, Bundaberg Broadcasters Pty Ltd were granted and introduced FM sound to Bundaberg. Known as HitzFM it was a very popular service, particularly with the younger members of the community. Once again, with updated technology and an increasing need for more space, Bundaberg Broadcasters moved from the Woongarra Street site to its current location in Crofton Street in 1992. The former 4BU radio station now houses a licensed cafe and restaurant.

== Description ==
The former 4BU radio station is a two-storey brick building with a flat roof. The building has floor to ceiling glass panels located in the front or southern facade and the western and eastern facade. The entrance doors, timber framed with glass panels and decorative, geometrically shaped handles, lead to the ground floor. As the building now functions as a cafe and restaurant, much of the ground floor has been fitted out with stainless steel preparation and cooking facilities. The safe is located in its original position on the western side of the building. A large, sweeping staircase, with original timber and metal handrail and balustrading leads to the first floor. The metal balustrading curves around and encloses the entire south eastern corner of the first floor. Adjacent to the staircase, along the western wall of the building, is a large group of floor to ceiling windows finished with original timber sunshading detail. Original concentric circle, metal light fittings are located on the first floor.

An original timber door with glass panel and louvred vents is located in the north-west corner of the first floor, and opens to an unoccupied room. On the door is painted the words "White Lotus Studio", providing evidence of its former use when Bundaberg Broadcasters occupied the building. Centrally located, at the rear of the northern end of the first floor are double doors with timber frames and glass panels, opening to a small foyer. Opening from this foyer are three original timber doors with soundproofing features. These doors open to the highly intact former recording studios. One room in the north-east corner is the most decorative and has a ribbed, undulating ceiling and timber geometric wall design which runs the length of the walls. The studio in the north-western corner has decorative wall and ceiling elements incorporating a "staggered" design. In each room, windows provide views to the adjacent studio.

The garage is located to the rear of the building and the brickwork on the western wall incorporates a decorative geometric design.

== Heritage listing ==
The former 4BU Radio Station was listed on the Queensland Heritage Register on 28 July 2000 having satisfied the following criteria.

The place is important in demonstrating the evolution or pattern of Queensland's history.

With its flat roof, floor to ceiling glass and highly intact interior decorative features, particularly ceiling and wall treatments in the former recording suites, as well as original timber and glass entrance doors, windows with timber sunshading features on the western side of the building, original stairwell with balustrading and light fittings, original timber and glass doors to both the main entrance and the entrance to the "White Lotus Room" recording suite, the former 4BU radio station is most significant as an excellent, intact example of commercial 1950s architecture.

A purpose built radio station, the building is significant for its association with Bundaberg Broadcasters, who have operated in the area for over 65 years, including broadcasting to troops in New Guinea during World War II.

The place is important in demonstrating the principal characteristics of a particular class of cultural places.

The former 4BU radio station is most significant as an excellent, intact example of commercial 1950s architecture.

The place is important because of its aesthetic significance.

The former 4BU radio station is most significant as an excellent, intact example of commercial 1950s architecture.

The place has a special association with the life or work of a particular person, group or organisation of importance in Queensland's history.

Stuart-Nairne prepared designs for a number of buildings in Bundaberg, including the fire station.
