= Steve Liebmann =

Australian retired television anchor, journalist and radio broadcaster (born 1944)

Steve Liebmann OAM
- Born: 4 May 1944 (age 82); Cooma, New South Wales, Australia
- Occupations: Television host; radio presenter; journalist; correspondent
- Years active: 1962−2010
- Notable credits: Television programs; Today (1982–1986), (1990–2005); Ten Eyewitness News (1987–1989); Ten Weekend News; Crime Investigation Australia; Radio host; 2CH host 1962–1967; 2UE senior journalist 1968; 2SM (1976–?); 2UE Breakfast host (2009–2010)
- Spouse: Di Liebmann (m. 1969)

Steve Liebmann (born 4 May 1944) is an Australian retired television presenter, journalist and radio broadcaster.

Liebmann is best known for co-hosting Today on the Nine Network between 1982 and 1986, and again from 1990 to 2005.

== Early life and career ==
Born in Cooma, New South Wales, he attended Monaro High School. He became a journalist in Cooma on Radio 2XL while still in high school. He hosted "Teen Scene" from 5:30 pm to 6:00pm on week days, playing the latest records.

Liebmann relocated to Canberra in 1962 and worked at radio 2CA, before moving to Sydney later in 1962 to take up a position with radio station 2UE. He presented an afternoon news and public affairs program on the station which became the top show in its timeslot. He eventually became director of news and public affairs at the station.

In 1976, he left to join 2SM, and also became the host of Seven's 11AM program, as well as anchoring the station's Sydney evening news. He hosted the Willesee program on several occasions.

As a journalist Liebmann wrote articles for The Bulletin and Men In Vogue.

== Today show ==
Liebmann joined the Nine Network in late 1981, to become the inaugural co-host of the national breakfast show Today, alongside Sue Kellaway, staying with the program until the end of 1986, when he joined the Ten Network to anchor TEN-10 Sydney's Eyewitness News, alongside Geraldine Doogue.

He rejoined Today in 1990 and remained at the Nine Network, presenting the program across Australia five days a week, until February 2005. He cited a mild heart attack as the reason for his retirement from the show at the age of 60. he was replaced by National Nine News US Correspondent Karl Stefanovic.

After leaving the program, Liebmann expressed disappointment to an AAP journalist about the content and format of Today under its new management, saying it had become a "poor imitation" of its Seven Network rival, Sunrise.

== TV presenting – other programs ==
During 2002 and 2003, Liebmann appeared on television in a counter-terrorism advertising campaign on behalf of the Australian government.

He presented Ten Weekend News in Sydney during 2006, and hosted Crime Investigation Australia on Foxtel, focusing on infamous Australian crimes. He also had a contract with 2UE, as well as doing some corporate work and public speaking.

In December 2009, Liebmann replaced Steve Price as Morning Show host on 2UE, but resigned in November 2010.

== Awards and recognition ==
Liebmann is the recipient of several journalistic awards, including the "News Presenter of the Year" from the Australian Commercial Radio Industry and the Penguin Award for Special Recognition for Contribution to News.

He was awarded the Medal of the Order of Australia in the 2023 Australia Day Honours.
