= 1053 AM =

AM radio frequency

The following radio stations broadcast on AM frequency 1053 kHz:

== Australia ==
- 2CA in Canberra, Australian Capital Territory (C-QUAM AM stereo)

== China ==
- CNR Senior Citizen Radio in Beijing

== Japan ==
- JOAR: Nagoya

== Russian Federation ==
- Radio Maria (Saint-Petersburg)

== United Kingdom ==
- Talksport, until 1 July 1994 BBC Radio 1
