= Skyfire (Canberra) =

Annual fireworks show held in Canberra

- Genre: Fireworks display
- Date: March
- Frequency: Annually
- Location: Canberra
- Inaugurated: 1989
- Most recent: 2026
- Attendance: More than 130,000 (2024)
- Patrons: hit 104.7 and other sponsors

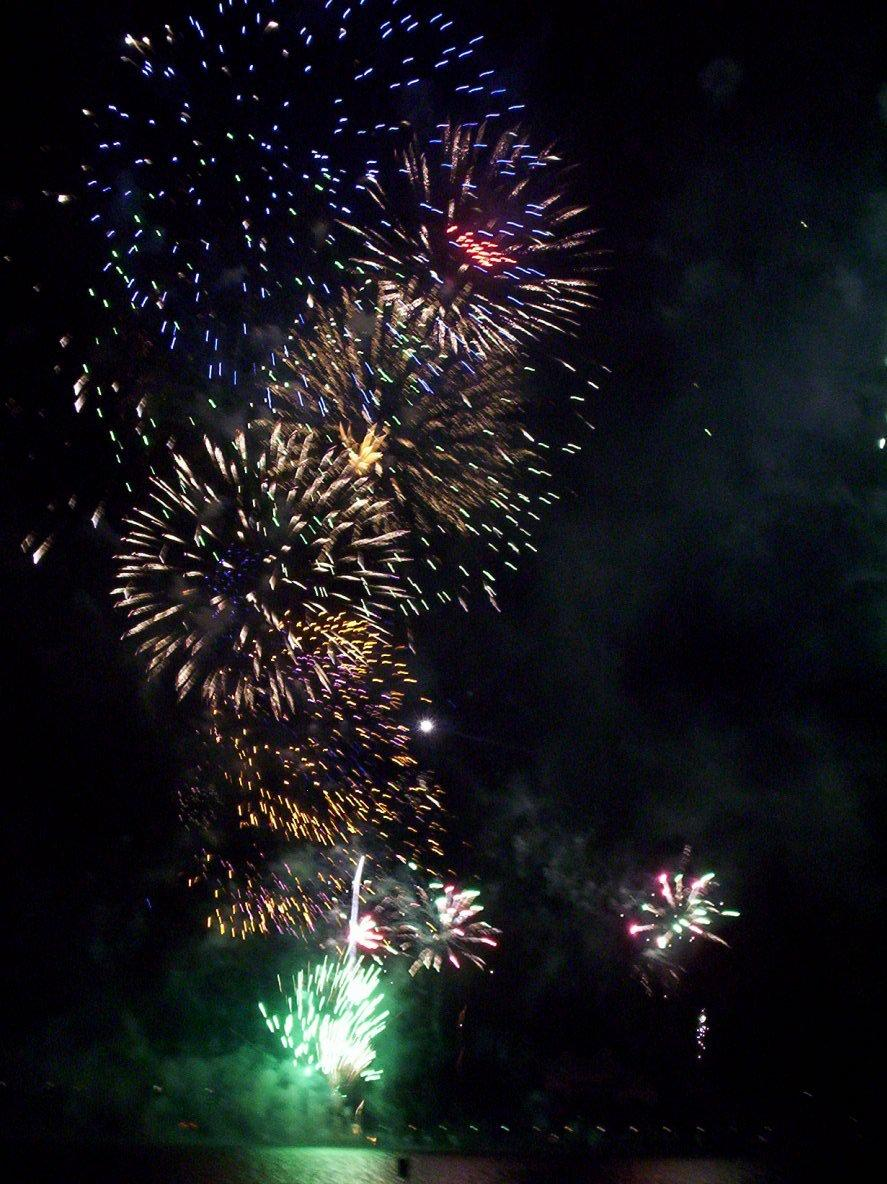
Skyfire 2005

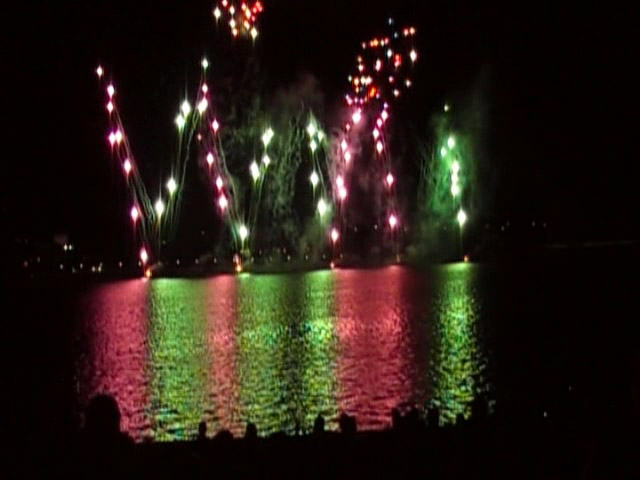
Skyfire 2006

Skyfire is an annual March fireworks show held over Lake Burley Griffin in Canberra, Australia since 1989. The event is funded by local radio stations hit 104.7 and Mix 106.3, and the display is synchronised to a soundtrack of music broadcast on the stations.

== History of the event ==
The first Skyfire was held on 18 March 1989, as FM 104.7's contribution to the Canberra Festival that year.

Around 60,000 people attended the second Skyfire on 11 March 1990, which was put on at a cost of around A$100,000.

On 10 March 1991, Skyfire III saw more than 2.5 tonnes of fireworks launched into the sky for Canberra's viewing pleasure.

In 1992, Skyfire was held on 8 March. It featured 3 tonnes of pyrotechnics and lasted for 35 minutes.

Skyfire V, on 7 March 1993, featured 436 separate shots, coordinated to music by artists including Madonna, Midnight Oil and Prince. The show used more than five tonnes of fireworks, launched from 10 pontoons floating in the middle of the lake.

In 1994, Skyfire was held on 13 March and featured 6 tonnes of aerial and water fireworks worth almost A$250,000.

Skyfire X, on 8 March 1998, attracted an estimated 120,000 visitors.

Skyfire XI, held on 7 March 1999, had grown to attract an estimated 180,000 visitors.

The 2006 Skyfire was held on 4 March, and called "Skyfire 18" because it was the eighteenth year of the fireworks. The day has become a large event with other activities including a display by the Roulettes aerobatic squadron and a performance by Lee Harding. There were around 35,000 individual fireworks used, with approximately 6,000 shooting comets and almost 3,000 shells.

More than 170,000 visitors turned out to see Skyfire 19 in 2007.

Skyfire 21 was held on 21 March 2009, with fireworks commencing at 8.33pm and lasting for 21 minutes. The firing zone was down the centre basin of Lake Burley Griffin up to Anzac Parade and Parliament House down to Regatta Point. Fortunato Foti and a band of pyrotechnicians from Foti International Fireworks provided the show which was "at least 30 per cent bigger than the previous years," with "over 3,000 aerial fireworks, 15 to 20,000 shooting comets". One barge shot off a few more fireworks for 5–10 minutes after the show completed.

On 19 March 2011 around 80,000 people attended Skyfire. That year over 30 youths were taken into custody by police for underage drinking at the event. The following year, 130 police were employed to patrol Skyfire, and youth reception stations were set up at the event.

The 2012 event featured more than 2,500 aerial fireworks.

Skyfire 25 in 2013 featured displays by the Royal Australian Navy (RAN), the Federation Guard and the Snowy Hydro Rescue Helicopter.

Skyfire in 2014 utilised around 3,000 individual cues and approximately eight kilometres of cabling.

Skyfire 2018 featured 40,000 pyrotechnic effects, 2,500 shells and 25,000 shooting comets. The firework display started at 8:30pm with events at Regatta Point starting at 6:00 pm including music, Federation Guard displays and a Royal Australian Air Force (RAAF) fast jet handling display.

Skyfire was cancelled in 2020, for the first time, due to the coronavirus pandemic in Australia. In November 2020, the 2021 show was also cancelled due to the pandemic.

On 26 October 2023 at 8 am local time, as part of a huge announcement, it was announced that Skyfire would return on 16 March 2024, after a 5-year hiatus due to the pandemic. amplifyCBR radio stations Hit104.7 and Mix 106.3 Canberra both co-hosted the event live from Regatta Point and Lake Burley Griffin.

Skyfire 34 was held on 14 March 2026. The firework display started at 8:30 pm, with around 120,000 people attending the event and events including food markets starting at 2:00 pm. On 2 November 2026, amplifyCBR announced that the 35th edition of Skyfire will be held on 13 March 2027.

== Attendance and pyrotechnics by year ==
Skyfire attendance and pyrotechnics
Date	Attendance	Details of pyrotechnics	References
18 March 1989	70,000		
11 March 1990	60,000		
10 March 1991	60,000	More than 2.5 tonnes of fireworks	
8 March 1992	70,000	3 tonnes of fireworks; display lasted 35 minutes	
7 March 1993	70,000	Featured 436 separate shots	
13 March 1994	70,000	Featured six tonnes of aerial and water fireworks worth almost $250,000	
12 March 1995	80,000	Incorporated 4500 special effects	
10 March 1996	70,000	More than 1.5 tonnes of fireworks	
9 March 1997	70,000		
8 March 1998	120,000		
7 March 1999	180,000		
12 March 2000	80,000		
3 March 2001	80,000		
9 March 2002	80,000		
8 March 2003	80,000		
6 March 2004	70,000	Two main barges and nine pontoons	
8 March 2005	80,000		
4 March 2006	80,000	35,000 individual fireworks used, with approximately 6,000 shooting comets and almost 3,000 shells	
10 March 2007	120,000	F-111 Jet performed a dump and burn to begin the show, the National Carillon used to launch fireworks	
15 March 2008	100,000		
21 March 2009	120,000		
20 March 2010	100,000	Three main barges and eight pontoons, the first time the modern setup was used	
19 March 2011	100,000		
17 March 2012	80,000	Featured more than 2,500 aerial fireworks, 25,000 shooting comets and around 40,000 pyrotechnic effects	
16 March 2013	100,000	Featured 40,000 individual pyrotechnics	
15 March 2014	120,000	More than 2000 aerial fireworks and 10,000 shooting comets, display lasting 18 minutes	
14 March 2015	100,000	Featured more than 20 tonnes of equipment set up in 11 positions along 400 metres of the lake's central basin, and more than 2,000 kilograms of explosive content.	
19 March 2016	110,000	More than 2,000 aerial fireworks, more than 10,000 ground-based fireworks	
18 March 2017	110,000	More than 2000 aerial fireworks, 15,000 ground-based fireworks	
17 March 2018	120,000	30th Skyfire show, celebrated with SKYFIRE30 spelled in pyro across the water	
16 March 2019	120,000	a primary barge exploded	
15 March 2020		cancelled, show on hiatus	
16 March 2024	130,000	First Skyfire in five years. 18 minute show featuring 40,000 effects, 2,500 shells and 25,000 shooting comets	
15 March 2025	120,000	20 minute show featuring 40,000 effects, 2,500 shells and 25,000 shooting comets preceded by a flyover by a F35 Lightning fighter jet	
14 March 2026	120,000	20 minute show featuring 40,000 effects, 2,500 shells and 25,000 shooting comets preceded by an aerobatic fly over, helicopter fire bombing display and a flyover by a F35 Lightning fighter jet	

== Sponsors ==
Skyfire is a hit104.7 Canberra event, with sponsorship over the years also offered by Casino Canberra, ActewAGL, and Canberra Airport.
