= Leigh Hatcher =

Australian journalist and author

- Born: 25 August 1955 (age 71)
- Occupations: Journalist, author
- Years active: 1973 – present
- Spouse: Meredith
- Children: 4

Leigh Hatcher (born 25 August 1955) is a veteran broadcast Australian journalist and author.

Hatcher's career highlights include working as the bureau chief for the Macquarie Radio Network in the Canberra Press Gallery. He has also worked at various radio stations including 2CA in Canberra and 5DN in Adelaide.

Hatcher was also employed by the Seven Network where he worked as a political correspondent in Canberra as well as a European correspondent when he lived in London, between the years of 1983 and 1985.

After returning from London, Hatcher took a break from television and returned to the radio station 5DN and hosted a radio show. Returning to Sydney, he worked as an on-the-road reporter for the Seven Network for a decade from 1988 to 1998. During this time he was the network's chief Olympic correspondent.

He was forced out of work for more than two years, suffering chronic fatigue syndrome. He wrote a best-selling book about the experience, I'm Not Crazy, I'm Just A Little Unwell.

Hatcher joined Sky News Australia in 2000 as a presenter of First Edition with Sharon McKenzie and later Nina May on weekdays. In January 2013, he finished presenting First Edition and was appointed news presenter on PM Agenda. In June 2013, he resigned from Sky News.

On 11 November 1975 Hatcher was one of the journalists present at former prime minister Whitlam's dismissal speech.

On 27 March 2011 Sheridan Voysey, presenter of national radio program Open House, announced Hatcher would serve as his replacement. Hatcher hosted the program, aired by Christian broadcaster Hope 103.2, until 8 December 2013.

In January 2014, after four decades of broadcast journalism, Hatcher became director for public affairs with the HammondCare organisation.

He is married with four children and ten grandchildren.

== Writing career ==
Hatcher has written three books – I'm Not Crazy, I'm Just A Little Unwell, and two books from the Open House radio program.
