= 2CC =

Radio station in Canberra, Australia

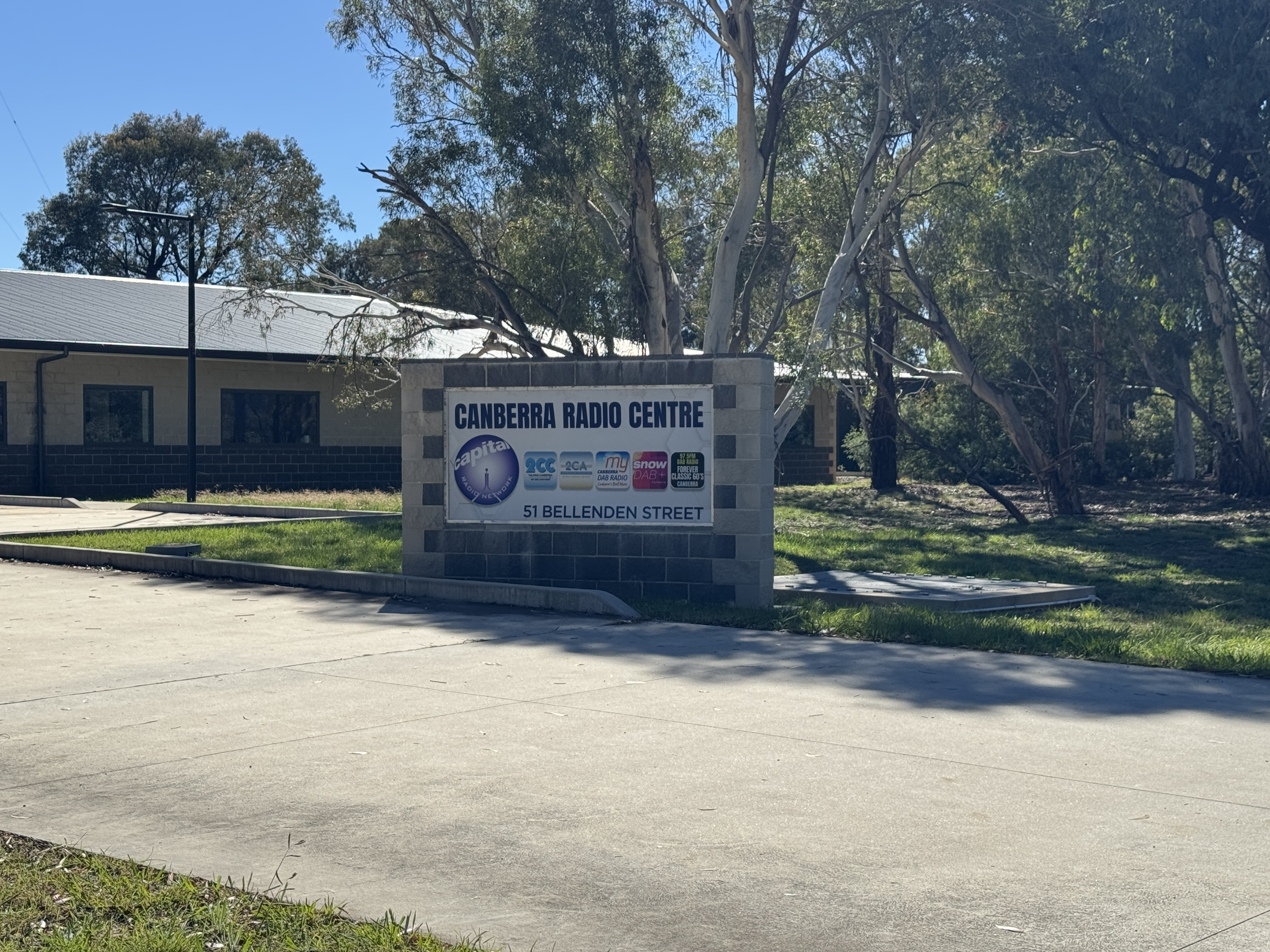
- Canberra, Australian Capital Territory; Australia
- Broadcast area: Canberra RA1 ()
- Frequencies: AM: 1206kHz; DAB+: 8D

Programming
- Language: English
- Format: News talk

Ownership
- Owner: Capital Radio Network (50%) Grant Broadcasters (50%); (Radio Canberra Pty Ltd)
- Sister stations: 2CA

History
- First air date: 31 October 1975
- Former frequencies: 1210 kHz (1975–1978)
- Call sign meaning: Capital City Broadcasters

Technical information
- Power: 5kW
- Transmitter coordinates: 35°13′4″S 149°7′11″E

Links
- Website: www.2cc.net.au

2CC is a commercial radio station on the AM band in Canberra, Australia. It began broadcasting on 1210 kHz in 1975 changing to 1206 kHz in 1978. It is jointly owned by Capital Radio Network and Grant Broadcasters.

== History ==
2CC, which began broadcasting on 31 October 1975, operated by Capital City Broadcasters, was Canberra's second commercial radio station, originally broadcasting popular contemporary music. 2CC began test transmission on 29 October 1975. 2CC continued its dominance over Canberra's other commercial radio station, 2CA, throughout the latter half of the 1970s and most of the 1980s. The station's founding executives were: Nicholas Erby (General Manager) and Rob McKay (Program Manager). The original daytime line up was Paul Ramsden, Dean Banks, John Bell and Jim Pilgrim. In June 1983, Australian Broadcasting Company Pty Ltd (now ARN) purchased the station from CCB. On 1 February 1986, the station began broadcasting in AM stereo. In 1988, KIX106 and FM 104 went to air as supplementary FM licences. KIX106 was a supplementary licence of 2CC, and FM 104.7 a supplementary licence of 2CA. In the mid-1990s, ARN (owner of 2CC and Mix 106.3) and Austereo (owner of 2CA and 104.7) merged to form a joint venture ownership of both FM stations, selling 2CC and 2CA to the Capital Radio Network in 1994 and 1997 respectively. In 2004, 50% ownership of 2CC and 2CA was sold to Grant Broadcasters. Currently, 2CC broadcasts a news talk format.

The broadcast range of the 5,000 watt transmitter covers Canberra and the Southern Tablelands region of New South Wales including Yass, Queanbeyan and Bungendore. The 5,000 watt AM signal travels as far as Cowra, Gundagai, Goulburn, Cooma and Braidwood. 2CC also broadcasts from Black Mountain Tower in Digital (DAB+) and streams its program on its website at www.2cc.net.au as well as other streaming platforms.

2CC was originally located on Bellenden Street, Crace, before moving to Hoskins Street, Mitchell. The AM towers are located near the original studio building.

In August 2019, 2CC and its sister station 2CA, moved into a multi-million dollar state of the art broadcast centre (Canberra Radio Centre) directly next door to 2CC's old original premises on Bellenden Street, Crace.

== Programming ==
=== Local content ===
2CC broadcasts Canberra's only commercial talkback format.

Mark Parton joined the station in late November 2008, as a fill-in presenter and in marketing after he left competing station Mix 106.3 in June that year. He replaced announcer Mike Jeffreys on the station's breakfast show in April 2009.

Parton himself announced his resignation from the station on 30 November 2015, with Parton's final show on 18 December 2015, after 7 years with 2CC and 33 years in radio (16 in Canberra), to focus on his marketing company PartonMe. In December 2015, it was announced that former television personality and salesman Tim Shaw would debut in the station's breakfast slot on 11 January 2016 to replace Parton.

In July 2019, 2CC axed its local breakfast show, hosted by Shaw, in favour of relaying the 2GB breakfast show with Alan Jones live from Sydney. Shaw was moved to the afternoon drive program when the change took effect. Jones was previously heard on 2CC in a one-hour highlights package which began airing in 2010 from 11am until midday. The 11am highlights package was replaced by the final hour of 2GB's Ray Hadley Morning Show, which 2CC also airs live from Sydney.

The decision to replace a local breakfast show with a Sydney program was criticised by local ABC Radio Canberra newsreader Julian Abbott who expressed his disappointment at 2CC being left with just one weekday local program. Just a month after being moved from his former breakfast show, Tim Shaw announced his resignation after having been with the station since 2016.

The local breakfast program has been hosted by Stephen Cenatiempo since 13 July 2020.

However, the majority of 2CC's daytime and nighttime programming is syndicated from Sydney with programs hosted by Mark Levy, Evan Lucas, John Stanley and Michael McLaren. 2CC airs a three-hour afternoon program from 3pm with Leon Delaney. Weekend programs include Life and Technology on Saturday at midday, House of Wellness on Sunday at midday and Healthy Living on Sunday night.

Local programming on weekends include Garden Gurus, Trading Post, Pet Tales, Canberra Weekender and Sunday Roast from 9.00am to 12.00pm hosted by Chris McLengahan, Eddie Williams, Pete Davidson and Ian Meikle, as well garden experts Paulene Cairnduff and Keith Colls, vets Nonna Green, Lucy Fish and pet behaviourist Heike Hahner.

=== News ===
2CC provides a 24-hour news service. Its own, locally based, Capital Radio News Service provides news bulletins from 5.30am every half-hour during its breakfast show and then hourly from 9.00am - 6.00pm Monday to Friday. It broadcasts locally based half-hourly news bulletins from 6.00am - 9.00am (then hourly till midday) on Saturday and Sunday mornings.

Overnight hourly news bulletins are supplied by Nine Radio.

=== Sport ===
During the rugby league season, the Continuous Call Team is broadcast from 2GB each Friday night, Saturday and Sunday with live NRL action. In March 2019, the station lost the rights to control local Canberra Raiders NRL games, with 2GB taking control from the 2019 NRL season.

== Controversy ==
=== 2002 plagiarism ===
In July 2002, 2CC was accused of plagiarism on the ABC television program Media Watch. The program alleged that journalist Kylie Johnson had been plagiarising stories from radio 666 ABC Canberra (now ABC Radio Canberra) news bulletins by changing a few words here and there and then reading them out on 2CC an hour later. In evidence, Media Watch presented transcripts of stories first broadcast on ABC Canberra and then re-broadcast on 2CC. The management of 2CC and the directors of the Capital Radio Network declined to comment on this incident.
