= Mix 106.3 =

Radio station in Canberra, Australia

Mix 106.3 (1CBR)

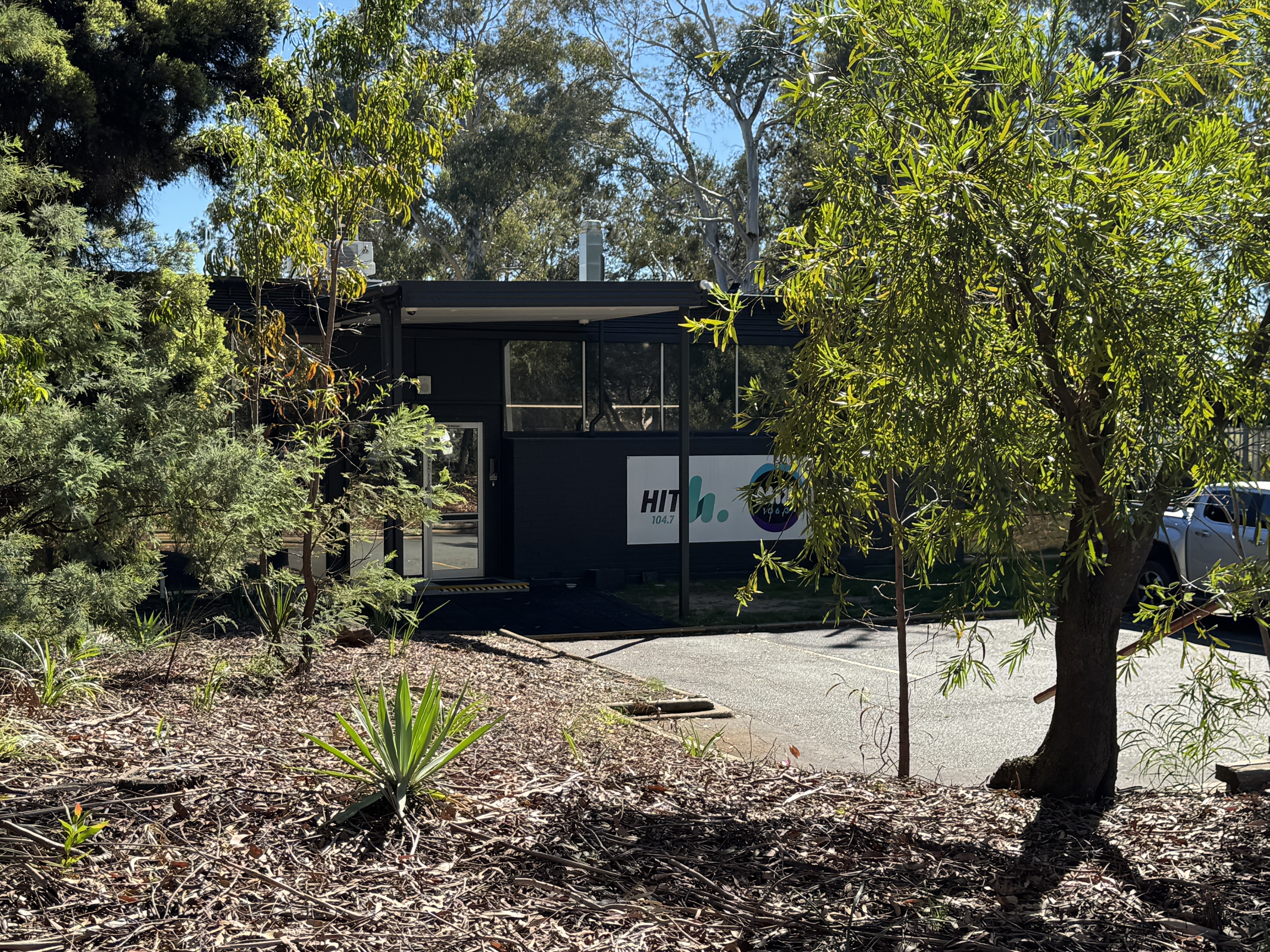
- Canberra, Australian Capital Territory; Australia
- Broadcast area: Canberra RA1 ()
- Frequencies: DAB+: 8D Canberra; FM: 106.3 MHz Canberra

Programming
- Language: English
- Format: Adult hits
- Affiliations: Gold Network; Triple M

Ownership
- Owner: ARN (50%) Southern Cross Austereo (50%); (amplifyCBR Pty Ltd)
- Sister stations: Hit104.7 Canberra

History
- First air date: 27 February 1988
- Former call signs: 2KIX (1988–1994)
- Former names: KIX FM; Canberra FM
- Call sign meaning: 1 = Australian Capital Territory; CanBerRa

Technical information
- ERP: 20,000 watts
- HAAT: 332 m
- Transmitter coordinates: 35°16′32″S 149°5′52″E
- Repeater: FM: 107.1 MHz Tuggeranong

Links
- Webcast: Listen live (via iHeartRadio)
- Website: Official website

Mix 106.3 (call sign: 1CBR) is a commercial radio station in Canberra, Australia and is owned by ARN and Southern Cross Austereo.

Mix 106.3 plays current hits and a variety of 1970s, 1980s and 1990s music (adult hits), primarily targeted at the 35+ age group. The station is affiliated to the Southern Cross Austereo Triple M network, and is sold to national advertisers in the KIIS network.

== History ==
KIX 106, as it was then known, and sister station FM104.7 (now Hit 104.7) were Australia's first supplementary FM licencees, as well as being the first new commercial FM radio stations licensed in Australia since 1980. KIX 106 was a supplementary licence of Canberra AM station 2CC, and FM104 a supplementary licence of AM station 2CA.

The station officially opened at 8am on 27 February 1988, with an inaugural broadcast hosted by Frank Fursey. Dennis Clairs was on air from midday until 3pm and Peter Mobbs from 3 pm to 6 pm with the KIX Party Mix from 6pm until midnight. KIX carried an iconic eagle mascot, using 'the eagle' as a nick-name for the station. On its first weekend of programs, KIX offered 10-in-a-row 'music sweeps', focusing on a teenage audience.

Six years after launch, station manager Steven Pead announced Capital City Broadcasters would re-brand to focus on an older demographic, having finished fifth in eight consecutive ratings surveys. On 12 February 1994, the station became as 'the new' 106.3 Canberra FM and would follow a similar 'soft' format to Melbourne's TTFM.

In March 1997, due to flat advertising conditions bought about by Commonwealth public sector cuts, ARN – owner of Mix 106.3 & 2CC, and Austereo – owner of 104.7 and 2CA, formed a joint venture ownership of both FM stations – Canberra FM Pty Ltd. The AM stations were sold off, and are currently operated by a joint-venture between Capital Radio Network and Grant Broadcasters.

In January 2020, the station received a new logo, with a similar branding to the rest of the KIIS Network.

In March 2022, the station switched from the KIIS Network to the Pure Gold Network due to its format shifting towards classic hits, with shows like the Kyle & Jackie O Hour of Power replaced by Jonesy & Amanda's JAM Nation.

On 9 September 2022, Bronte and Wilko retired from the station.

In July 2023, the station received a 25.7% rating in the Canberra radio ratings, consolidating its Canberra radio lead.

== On-Air ==
=== Current lineup ===
- Kristen & Nige – 6–9 am weekdays
- Nige106.3 – 9–10 am weekdays
- Pat – 10am–3 pm weekdays
- Larry 1–6 pm
- Kristen and Nige's Hour of Power – 6–7 pm Weekdays
- The Christian O'Connell Show – 7–8 pm Weekdays
- Jonesy & Amanda – 8–9 pm weekdays
- Rock & Roll Rabbit Holes - 9–10 pm Tuesday, 5–6 pm Sunday
- The Cam & Renee Show – 8–9 am Saturday
- Cam & Renee's Real Estate Show – 9–10 am Saturday
- Raiders on Mix – Live coverage of the Canberra Raiders NRL matches

== News ==
The station operates a newsroom which it shares with sister station hit104.7, providing a 7-day news service offering comprehensive coverage of news from the Canberra region and around the globe.

=== News Team ===
- Kate Rice (News Director)
- Ashley Nolan
- Renee Bogatko
- Tamara Cartwright
- Haidyn Vecera

== Studios ==
Both Mix 106.3 and Hit 104.7 broadcast from their studio complex in Bellenden Street, Crace. The broadcast range of the stations is focused to Canberra and some neighbouring regions extending as far as Yass in the north (55 km from Canberra CBD), Tharwa in the South (30 km from Canberra CBD) and Bungendore in the east (40 km from Canberra CBD).

== Sponsored events ==
The station sponsors the annual The Christmas Party (formerly the Special Children's Christmas Party), broadcast from Exhibition Park in Canberra. In 2024, it sponsored the annual Skyfire fireworks event, together with its sister station Hit 104.7.
