= Magic Mountain, Merimbula =

Theme park in New South Wales, Australia

Magic Mountain
- Interactive map of Magic Mountain
- Location: Merimbula, New South Wales, Australia
- Coordinates: 36.875518°S 149.901967°E
- Opened: 26 November 1983
- Owner: Blyton Group
- Operating season: Year-round
- Area: 24 acres (9.7 ha)

Attractions
- Total: 12
- Roller coasters: 1
- Water rides: 2
- Website: magicmountain.net.au

Magic Mountain is a small theme park situated on the Sapphire Coast of New South Wales, near the town of Merimbula in Australia. The park attracts approximately 40,000 visitors per year and is a significant tourism drawcard for the region. During peak season, the park employs 50 staff from the surrounding area. Magic Mountain was opened on 26 November 1983 and has since expanded, providing visitors with a variety of educational and exciting experiences catering to both adults and children. The park charges and entry price however once in it include unlimited access to all the rides, In keeping with Magic Mountain's family theme, children under 4 are able to ride suitable attractions for free with a paying adult.

In February 2018, the theme park was sold by Tunshow Pty. Ltd to Blyton Group.

== Attractions ==
The park's main attractions include the Sapphir Speedster Roller Coaster, added in 1994. This is a 335 m (1,099 ft) steel roller coaster manufactured by Pinfari running with single-car trains which reach a height of 12 m (39 ft) and speeds of 36 km/h. The Alpine Slide is a popular 600 m (2,000 ft) steel toboggan track which began operating in 1984. Two waterslides - The Black Hole and Wipe Out along with the Kiddie Splash Pool make up the park's water attractions.

Other attractions include Grand Prix Cars, Mini Golf, Dodgem Cars, The Crazy Car and Tea Cup Ride, Tube rider and the Triassic Park (an attraction featuring life-sized model dinosaurs in "natural habitats").

== Awards ==
In 2013 Magic Mountain was voted 9th in travel website TripAdvisor's Traveller's Choice awards for the top 10 amusement and water parks in the South Pacific region.

Since 2013 Magic Mountain has received Travelers' choice award in 2014 and 2016.
