= 4BU =

Radio station in Bundaberg, Queensland, Australia

- Bundaberg, Australia; Australia
- Broadcast area: Bundaberg
- Frequency: 1332 kHz

Programming
- Format: Classic Hits

Ownership
- Owner: ARN; (Bundaberg Broadcasters Pty. Ltd.)
- Sister stations: Hitz939

History
- First air date: 12 December 1935

Technical information
- ERP: 5kW
- HAAT: 61 m
- Transmitter coordinates: 24.8455°S 152.4042°E

Links
- Website: www.4bu.com.au

4BU is an Australian radio station serving the Bundaberg region in Queensland, Australia. It was opened in December 1935.

4BU is a classic hits station playing hit songs from the 1960s right through to the mid-2000s. Owned by ARN, 4BU places strong emphasis on local programming, with its entire daytime lineup broadcast from its Maryborough St studios.

4BU also takes talk programming from 2UE overnight.

In November 2021, 4BU, along with other stations owned by Grant Broadcasters, were acquired by the Australian Radio Network. This deal allows Grant's stations, including 4BU, to access ARN's iHeartRadio platform in regional areas. The deal was finalized on 4 January 2022. It is expected 4BU will integrate with ARN's Pure Gold Network, but will retain its current name according to the press release from ARN.

== On-air line up ==
- Weekdays

5.30am to 10am: The Big Breakfast with Mark
10am to 1pm: The Feel Good Workday with Mark
1pm to 4pm: The Feel Good Workday with Karina
4pm to 7pm: JAM Nation With Jonesy & Amanda
7pm to 8pm: The Christian O'Connell Show

== Heritage listing ==
The 4BU Radio Station building at 55 Woongarra Street was built by the station in 1957 and occupied until 1992 when the station relocated to larger premises. The building was listed on the Queensland Heritage Register in 2000.
