= Eagle FM (Australia) =

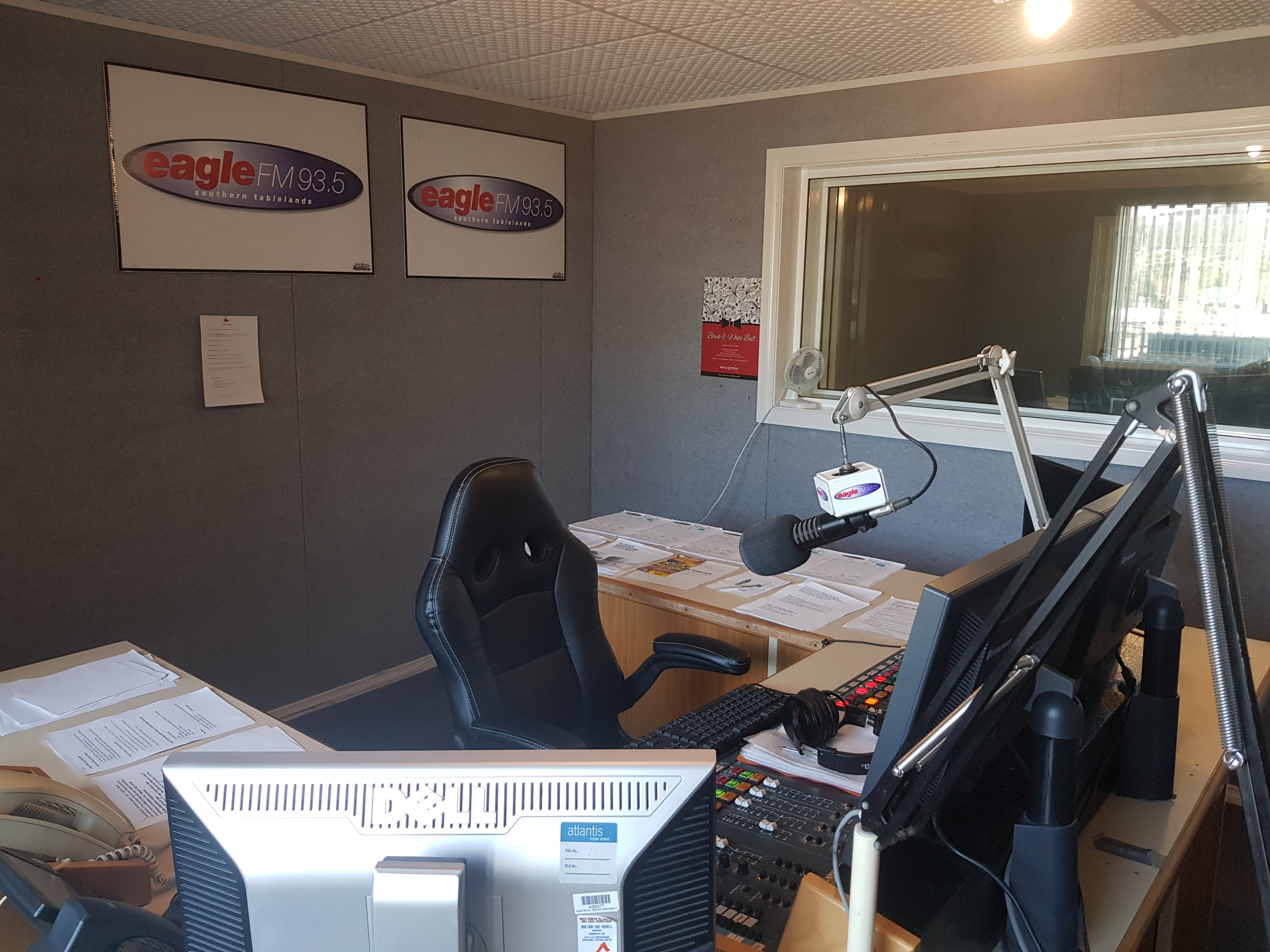
- 93.5 Eagle FM's primary studio
- Goulburn, New South Wales; Australia
- Broadcast area: Southern Tablelands
- Frequency: 93.5 MHz

Programming
- Format: Contemporary Hits

Ownership
- Owner: Capital Radio Network (50%); Grant Broadcasters (50%)
- Sister stations: GNFM, Snow FM

History
- First air date: 31 January 1997
- Call sign meaning: 2SNO – Snow FM (Eagle FM's sister station)

Technical information
- Transmitter coordinates: 34.757890°S 149.763401°E
- Repeaters: 103.9 MHz, Crookwell

Links
- Webcast: player.listenlive.co/62491
- Website: www.eaglefm.com.au

93.5 Eagle FM is a contemporary hit music station based in Goulburn,[Australia and broadcasting to the Southern Tablelands region of New South Wales on 93.5 FM. Eagle FM is a part of the Capital Radio Network.

== About ==
Eagle FM launched on 31 January 1997 as the subsequent FM licence to Goulburn's commercial station on AM, 2GN.

The station is owned in a near 50–50 joint venture between Capital Radio Network and Grant Broadcasters trading as Goulburn Radio Broadcasters Pty. Ltd. The station shares its branding and music with fellow Capital Radio Network station Snow FM.

Eagle FM's Goulburn studios ("Radio Goulburn") are shared with sister station GNFM. The building is located on the corner of Lagoon and Union streets. Eagle FM is primarily played out from Studio A. Goulburn Radio Broadcasters is also responsible for broadcasting Grant Broadcasters' national hot country network, KIX Country, in the Southern Tablelands.

Eagle FM has a repeater in Crookwell, re-transmitting Eagle FM on 103.9 MHz.

== History ==
Eagle FM's Twitter account is the 77th oldest among Australian radio stations.

The station's playout software is Zetta from RCS, having previously used Master Control also an RCS product.

In April 2020, the COVID-19 pandemic prevented local Anzac Day services proceeding. In response to this, Eagle FM and 2GN provided a dawn service airing just prior to 6 am programming.

On 31 October 2020, Eagle FM's Dylan and Matthew 'MJ' Brokenbrough broadcast live for 24 hours straight in support of Goulburn's Relay For Life which had changed their usual event due to coronavirus. This event was nominated for a Goulburn Australia Day 2021 award in the 'Event of The Year' category.

== Programs ==
Eagle FM broadcasts a number of local and syndicated hosted programs:

Eagle FM Program Schedule (QT1,2026)
Program	Time	Host Studios	Notes
Breakfast With Brad & Alfie	Weekdays 6 am to 10 am	Eagle FM	Local program
Mornings with Jack	Weekdays 10 am to 1 pm	Eagle FM	Local program
Afternoons with Bec	Weekdays 1 pm to 5 pm	Snow FM	Eagle FM and Snow FM announcers switch stations for the Arvo show
Will & Woody	Weekdays 5 pm to 7 pm		Syndicated audio packages from ARN
Up All Night with April	Weeknights 7 pm to 12 pm	Snow FM	
		Eagle FM and Snow FM announcers switch stations for weekends	

== Local Announcers ==
- Jevan “Jev” Collins (2025-2026)
- Anthony “Ant” Johnston (2024-2025)
- Sam Mansfield (2022-2025)
- Gemma Sweeney (2021–2024)
- Jacob Aquilina (Breakfast, 2021)
- Jenna D'Apice (Workdays, 2021)
- Matthew 'MJ' Brokenbrough (Breakfast, 2019–2021)
- Dylan Finch (Workdays, 2018–2021)
- James Preston (Breakfast, 2018–2019)
- Bill 'Billy' Bradley (Breakfast, 2016–2018)
- Jack Wallance (2016–2018)
- Damien Haffenden (2013–2014)
- Yasemin Kemal (2015)
- Murray Ryan (2013)
- Dene Broadbelt (2012–2013)
- Andrew Mata (2010–2013)
- Joe (Joey) Groth (2011–2011)
- Rick Shipp (2008)
- Jason McLean (2000–2002)
- Matt ‘Sutto’ Sutton (1999-2000)
- Dan Cassin (1998)
- Andy Young
- Blair Woodcock
- Ryan Nicholls
- Luke 'Crossy' Cross

== Awards and recognition ==
- 2021, Eagle FM has been nominated for an Australia Day award in the Event of The Year category, for their 'Radio Relay' Broadcast marathon in 2020.
- 2020, Eagle FM won the Goulburn Chamber of Commerce & Industry's Business 2580 Award for Best Media & Entertainment Company.
- 2019, Dylan Finch was a finalist in the Australian Commercial Radio Awards (ACRA's) for 'Best Achievement In Production'.
- 2017, Bill Bradley won the ACRA for 'Best Newcomer On-Air', country market
- 2016's ACRA's saw Eagle FM's Andy Young win Best Entertainment/Music Presenter (Country)
- 2002, Jason McLean won the ACRA for Best Music Personality and Best music special.
- 2001, Jason McLean won the Raward for Best Music personality.

== See also ==
- GNFM
- Snow FM
- Capital Radio Network
- Commercial Radio Australia
