= 2CA =

Radio station in Canberra, Australia

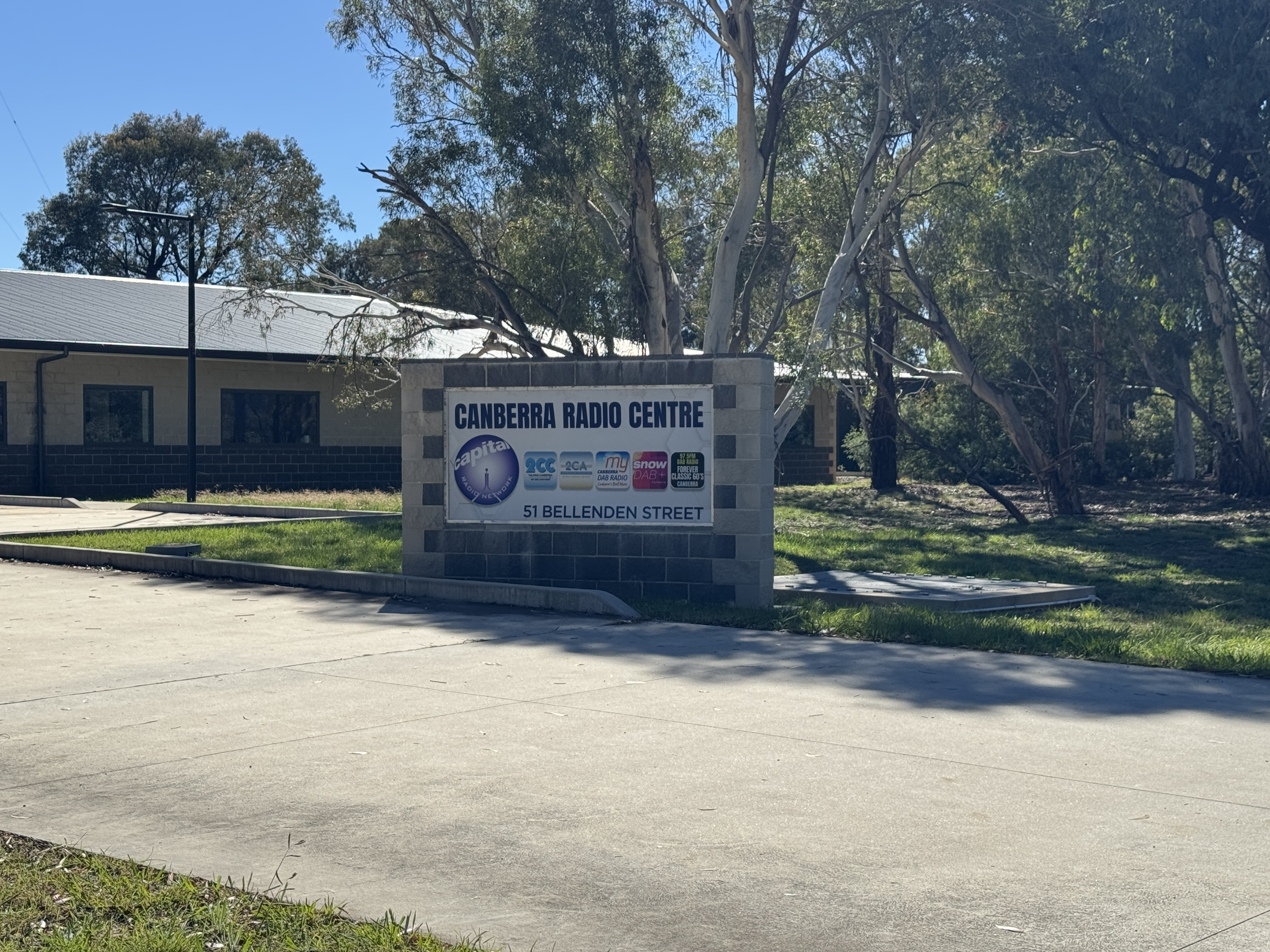
- Canberra, Australian Capital Territory; Australia
- Broadcast area: Canberra
- Frequencies: AM: 1053 kHz; DAB+: 8D
- Branding: Forever Classic 2CA

Programming
- Language: English
- Format: Classic hits, oldies

Ownership
- Owner: Capital Radio Network (50%) Grant Broadcasters (50%); (Radio Canberra Pty Ltd)
- Sister stations: 2CC; 60's Music 97.5/DAB+ 70's Music DAB+ 6IX

History
- First air date: 14 November 1931
- Former frequencies: 1050 kHz (1931–1978)
- Call sign meaning: 2 – NSW; CA – CAnberra

Technical information
- Licensing authority: ACMA
- Power: 5,000 watts
- Transmitter coordinates: 35°13′12″S 149°8′56″E

Links
- Public licence information: Profile
- Webcast: Listen live (via iHeartRadio)
- Website: www.2ca.com.au

2CA is an Australian commercial radio station on the AM band in Canberra. It is jointly owned by the Capital Radio Network and Grant Broadcasters. The station broadcasts on AM Stereo 1053 kHz and on DAB+ Digital Radio.

2CA was Canberra's first radio station, commencing in 1931 on 1050 kHz, changing to 1053 in 1978. The station plays a variety of hits from the 1960s to the 1990s in its current "Forever Classic" format.

== History ==
=== 1930s ===
Jack Ryan was an AIF veteran and former signaller during the first World War. In the late 1920s Ryan relocated to Canberra, setting up an electrical repair shop in the Canberra suburb of Kingston. He was soon operating an experimental wireless telegraphy station (Callsign: VK2LE) communicating with other such stations throughout Australia and the Pacific. In early 1930 he upgraded his equipment to wireless telephony and began broadcasting experimental programs to the Nation's Capital and immediate environs. The programmes were well received by Canberra listeners and after approaching the Postmaster-General's Department, Jack was granted Canberra's first (and for many years, only) commercial broadcasting licence.

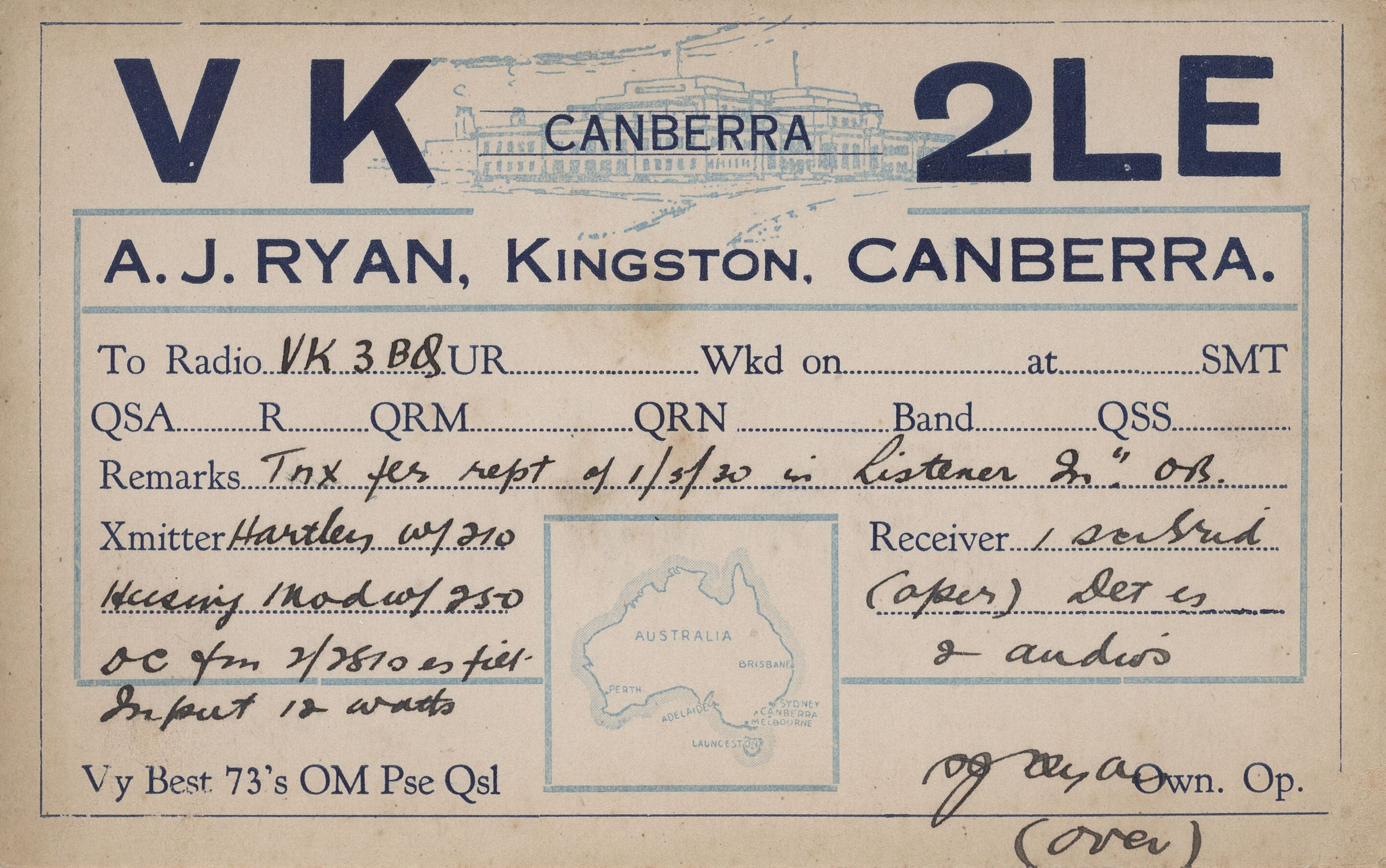
Note from Jack Ryan to Max Howden early 1930 thanking him for publicity for his new experimental broadcasting service

2CA began broadcasting with just a small 50 watt transmitter from the back of Ryan's shop. The station was officially opened on 14 November 1931 by PE Dean CMG, Secretary Department of Home Affairs. In February 1932 Ryan hired his first broadcasting cadet, a 17 year old George Kenneth Barlin from Taree. Barlin would later go on to become Canberra's father of television.

By December 1933, 2CA had increased its transmitter to 500 watts and moved to a small purpose-built studio in Molonglo (now Fyshwick), on a low hill close to the Queanbeyan–Canberra road (near what is now the intersection of Hindmarsh Drive and Canberra Avenue). The hill quickly became known as "Radio Hill".

In February 1937, Ryan attended a peak conference of commercial radio stations, hosted by A.E. Bennett, managing director of 2GB. The conference aimed to establish a radio network for nationwide broadcasting. Later that year, Ryan sold 2CA to Denison Estates, owners of 2GB, and the station began to operate under the name of Canberra Broadcasters Ltd as part of the Macquarie Network.

The new owners wasted no time in constructing a new home for 2CA. By November 1937, the station had moved from its somewhat makeshift studios at Radio Hill to temporary studios at Civic, while the new permanent 2CA building was under construction.

On 18 December 1937, Prime Minister Joseph Lyons laid the foundation stone of the studio building at 4 Mort Street, Canberra City, next to the Civic Theatre. The two-storey complex would comprise a large studio with a 49 ft. x 27 ft. stage, two small studios, common control room, copy room, workshops and record room. The first floor included two flats for company staff.

2CA's new home opened on 3 June 1938, officiated by the Prime Minister, with a party at the Hotel Canberra. Seventy-five guests travelled from Sydney for the event, which included an edition of the "Tummy Club" show broadcast from the railway station. The transmitter power was increased again from 500 watts to 2,000 watts and moved to Gungahlin.

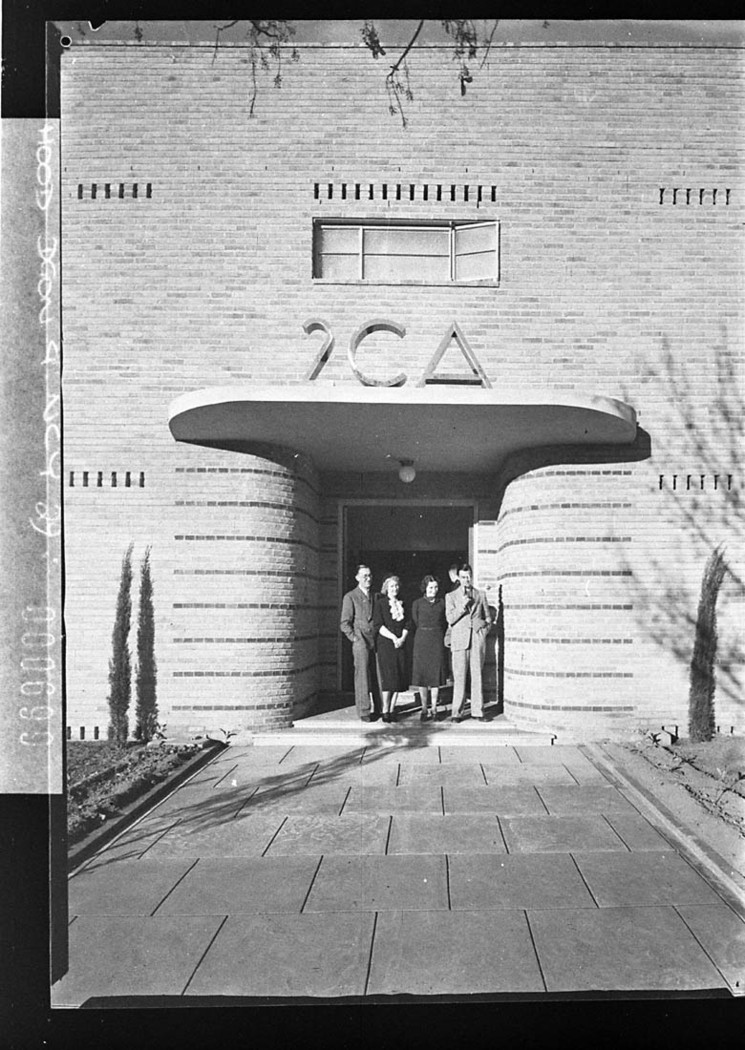
The purpose built 2CA studio and administration building, shortly after opening in June 1938. The newly planted seedlings are evident in the foreground.

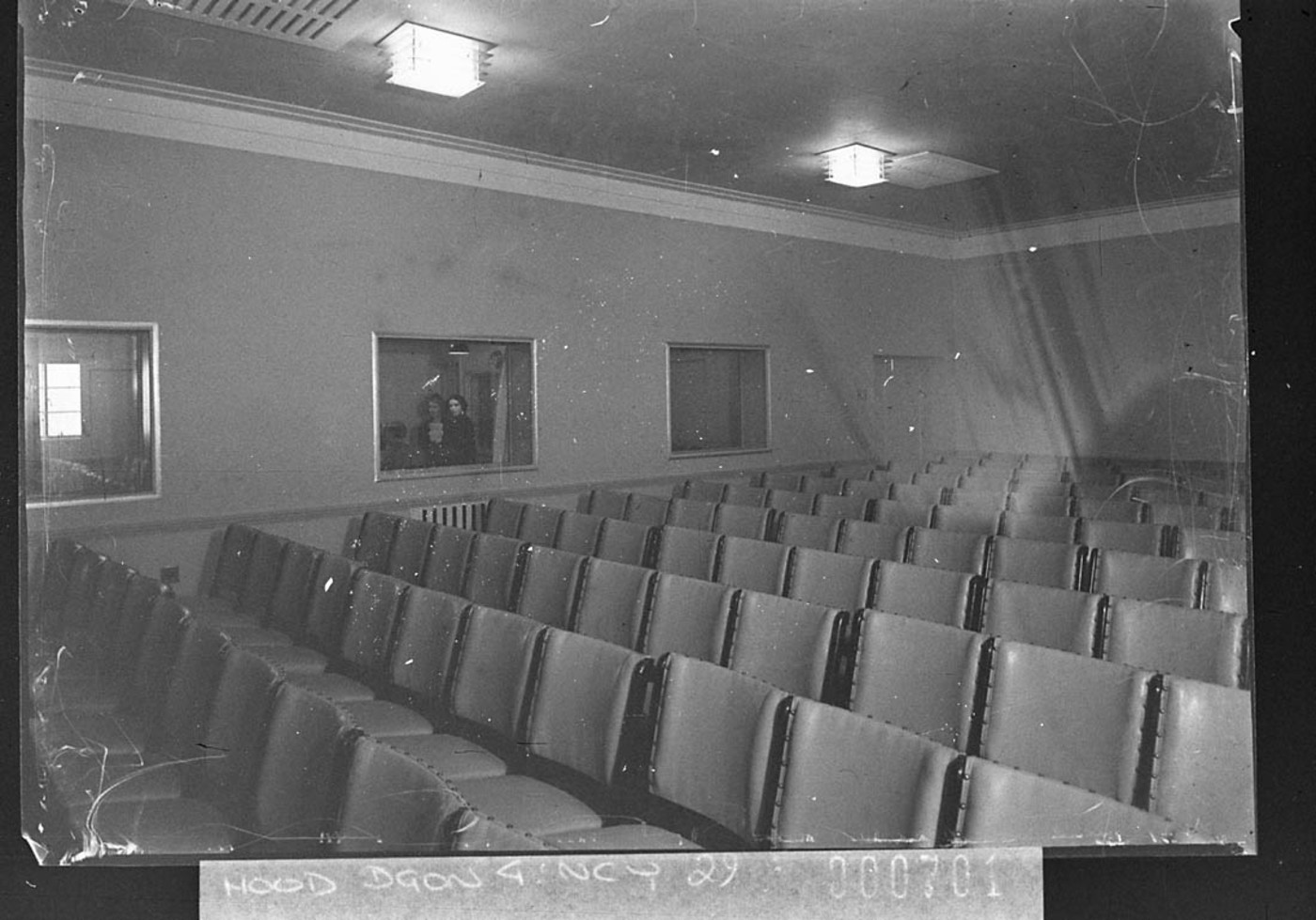
2CA's new auditorium in June 1938

In July 1938 Sir Hugh Denison announced a further expansion and reorganisation of the Macquarie Broadcasting Service with a capital of A£250,000. Affiliated stations in the new network were 2CA Canberra; 2GB and 2UE Sydney; 2WL South Coast; 2HR Hunter River; 3AW Melbourne; 3HA Hamilton; 3TR Sale; 3SH Swan Hill; 4BH Brisbane; 5DN Adelaide; 5RM Renmark; 6PR Perth; 6KG Kalgoorlie.

By October 1938 competition was on the way, in the form of Canberra's second radio station 2CY (now Radio National). With the mast nearing completion, the station was due to be on air before Christmas. 2CA wasn't going to take this lying down and began to significantly expand its broadcasting hours. At that time, 2CA was broadcasting daily from 7am to 10.30pm, but would regularly take off-air breaks mid-morning (around 9am-10.30am) and early afternoon (12.30 to 3.30pm). However, on Thursday 6 October 1938, 2CA said 'goodnight everybody' for what had planned to be the last time.

On the evening of Friday 7 October, in an extraordinary demonstration of early radio networking, 2CA commenced its first overnight radio service. Making use of time-zone variations, 2CA began to simulcast radio from South Australia from 11.30pm to 12.30am (11pm to 12pm SA time), then over to Western Australia from 12.30am to 3.30am (9.30pm to 12.30am WA time), picking up New Zealand radio from 3.30am to 5am (5.30am to 7am NZ time). It is probable 2CA took a feed from fellow Macquarie radio stations 5DN in Adelaide and 6PR in Perth. The next day, the station had closed gaps in its local daytime schedule, delivering Canberra's first 24-hour broadcasting station – only the second radio station in Australia to do so. However, it would be relatively short-lived, with the outbreak of WW2 less than 12-months away.

Canberra's second radio station, ABC's 2CY, was officially opened by Prime Minister Lyons at 7.50pm on Friday 23 December 1938. The station would be of limited competition to 2CA, being a relay of 2FC and 2BL Sydney (2CY would switch between the two). The only local program to commence on 2CY at that time was five minutes of Canberra Times News to be broadcast from 7.55am to 8.00am Monday to Saturday.

With the outbreak of World War II looming, new legislation came into effect in August 1939, effectively censoring radio stations to safeguard national security. 5 August was the last publication of 2CA's program schedule in the Canberra Times for over a year.

=== 1940s ===
By 1940 wartime 2CA was broadcasting 6.30am to 11.30pm daily and for the first time was taking out display advertising to promote programs in its schedule. Daytime programs were deliberately female skewed, describe by the station as "Mainly for women", while evening melody programs were designed to "Relax". A 15 minute War Diary was broadcast each evening at 10.15, following the BBC News at 9.30pm.

In 1946, with the war over, 2CA was eager to put forth its image of leading commercial radio station, with a comprehensive program schedule. The post-war line up was advertised in the 1946/47 Radio Listeners' Annual as Phil Desmond (Top of the Pops, Who, Crosby Croons); Len Major (Breakfast and Saturday Dance); Reg Adams (Newsreader and Afternoons); Bruce Stokes (Luncheon and Friday Swin); Graham Connolly (Evenings) and Rex Morrisby (Sunday Listener Arranged Programmes). Optimistically, the station advised they anticipated 'shortly' returning to 24-hour broadcasting. In fact it would be 21 years until that would occur.

=== 1950s ===
In June 1950, 2CA manager George Barlin (later to be a founder of Canberra's first television station CTC-7) announced plans for a modern radio station and studio, with provision for a theatrette and television facilities. The new building was to comprise three studios, capable of handling four broadcasts simultaneously, equipped with disc-recording and tape recording equipment. The station would not move to its new premises at 64 Northbourne Avenue until 1954.

Canberra's third radio station, ABC's 2CN, commenced broadcasting on Wednesday 21 January 1953 at 7:45pm, with a live broadcast from the Albert Hall. Sharing studios and transmitter sites with 2CY, the new station would further reduce 2CA's audience share.

On Thursday 3 January 1957 another new rival came to town, with the opening of Canberra's first drive-in cinema, Starlight, in Watson. The cinema was met with much local fanfare and as the fourth cinema in Greater Canberra (after Captiol Manuka, Civic Theatre and New Star Theatre Queanbeyan) and presented yet another audience and advertising rival to 2CA. Within a week, 2CA had doubled its daily schedule advertising in The Canberra Times, covering its full 6am to Midnight schedule (11pm on Sundays). Previously the station had promoted an evening schedule from 6pm.

While 2CA had been preparing to be part of the arrival of television in Canberra since 1950, it would not be until 19 May 1958 that station owners Canberra Broadcasters Pty Ltd would join forces with the Federal Capital Press of Australia Pty Ltd (owners of The Canberra Times) to form a public company Canberra Television Ltd, with a contribution of £45,000 each.

=== 1960s ===
On 2 June 1962 television station CTC 7, of which 2CA was a major shareholder, went to air for the first time. Six months later, on 18 December ABC 3 became Canberra's second television station. Thus began the steady decline of 2CA being a primary provider of evening family entertainment. The golden era of radio had come to an end. 2CA's format began to evolve away from a steady stream of radio serials, towards a news, music and information format.

By the mid-1960s 2CA's weekend schedule was increasingly dominated by sports and racing coverage. Though lucrative, it provided scant entertainment for Canberra's large teenage population, many preferring nearby Goulburn's 2GN which played more current music.

It was originally intended that on the evening of Saturday 2 December 1967, 2CA went off-air for the last time. However, the station commenced 24 hour broadcasting the previous day on Friday 1 December 1967, with its first Midnight to dawn shift hosted by Tony Hansen on the following Monday. The following weekend saw the launch of Party Time, a program that would become the soundtrack of a generation of local Canberrans.

2CA's mid-dawn program would later be simulcast on 2XL Cooma, with the station service being known on air as "CA-XL".

=== 1970s ===
At 7am on Friday 31 October 1975, Canberra's second commercial radio station, 2CC, began broadcasting. Promising a strong metropolitan music-based format with an emphasis on the Top 40, 2CA's new independent rival promised to be formidable competition. In a direct dig at 2CA, 2CC promised that the station would broadcast 'no sporting coverage'. 2CC soon topped the Canberra ratings survey, continuing its dominance over 2CA throughout the latter half of the 1970s and most of the 1980s.

2CA's frequency changed in 1978, moving from 1050 to 1053AM, in accordance with the Geneva Frequency Plan of 1975. This required all AM radio stations in Australia to shift to a 9 rather than 10 kHz spacing.

The station stopped broadcasting horse racing on 1 October 1979 and received a new format of a mixture between top 40 and rock, with more news, aiming at the 18-39 age group.

=== 1980s ===
On 25 June 1982 the 2CA studio building was sold by Macquarie Broadcasting to Sydney-based Lewis Development Pty Ltd for $1.5 million to make way for a proposed hotel development. 2CA manager John Martin announced the station would move to the other side of Northbourne Avenue to the first floor of the Jolimont Centre, which was under construction, and be operational by January 1983 – the station's 50th year of continuous broadcasting. The station would not move to its new home until March 1983.

The station changed formats several times during the early 1980s. On 18 September 1983 at 10:53 am, 2CA changed format to an adult contemporary format, aimed at over-30s. 2CA manager Ron Collins stated the week before the format change that there had been some justified criticism that 2CA and 2CC sounded very similar to listeners. Collins stated that the style would be slightly broader than that used by 2Day FM in Sydney. On 8 August 1984, the station's format changed again to a solid gold music format, under the title Solid Gold 2CA, after the resignation of former manager Ron Collins and the appointment of the then-new manager Mike Peterson a week before, focusing only on hits between 1963 and 1983. The format ended up being a success.

On 1 February 1986, 2CA, as well as 2CC went to air in stereo-AM. 2CA broadcast from the then-new Mitchell Transmitter site, after building it in January along with a new 5,000 watt Nautel Transmitter, using the STC valve transmitter as stand-by transmitter. On the same day, 2CA changed its news format, instead of broadcasting Macquarie network news from Sydney. 2CA at the time, offered a service combining local, national and international news in a bulletin designed for Canberra listeners.

In early February 1988, 2CA began music test broadcasts for its new supplementary FM licence, FM104.7. To complement its new sister station's format, 2CA adopted a 'News Talk' format leveraging resources of the Macquarie network.

On 26 February 1988, John Fairfax announced it had sold Macquarie Radio Network to a Queensland-based consortium, Sonance Limited.

The next day, on 27 February 1988, 2CA's new sister station FM104.7 and 2CC's KIX 106 officially launched at 8am, following three weeks of test music broadcasts. Both stations were a week late in launching owing to their frequencies causing interference with other FM signals, requiring filtering equipment to correct. The new stations were Australia's first supplementary FM licences.

By April 1988, Sonance Limited had sold 2CA and FM104.7 to Austereo for $15 million. In June the results of the first survey since the introduction of two new FM stations gave 2CA 11.6% of the radio audience with its news-talk format, ahead of its sister station FM104.7 on 9.5%. Station manager of Macquarie Canberra, Greg St John, said the recent sale to Austereo had left the stations in financial limbo and unable to package their product during the ratings period earlier in the year.

On 9 August 1988, the station changed its name to Light and Easy 1053, changing format to easy-listening music and targeting the 35+ age group. Light and Easy changed back to 1053 2CA on 2 January 1989.

=== 1990s ===
The 2CA studios had to be evacuated on 29 November 1993 when a man crashed his car into the ground floor of the Jolimont Centre and tried to blow up the building. Staff from 2CA (and sister station FM104.7) had to be rescued from their first floor studio by smashing a window and climbing down a ladder.

On 20 March 1997 a new joint venture between Canberra's two FM stations (Mix 106.3 and FM104.7) was announced. Broadcasting ownership laws meant the new company would need to sell-off 2CA. 2CC had been sold by Capital City Broadcasters in 1994. Peter Harvie, managing director of 2CA's parent company Austereo announced that 2CA would be sold.

2CA was bought by the Capital Radio Network, owners of 2CC as well as 2GN Goulburn and 2XL Cooma. Both 2CA and 2CC then moved to a building at 52 Hoskins Street in the Canberra suburb of Mitchell.

=== 2000s ===
On 14 November 2001, the station celebrated its 70th anniversary with 2CA's first and longest serving employee, George Barlin.

In June 2004 Grant Broadcasters purchased part ownership of Radio Canberra Pty Ltd (2CA & 2CC) to form a joint venture with the Capital Radio Network. 2CA broadcasts to the Canberra and Southern Tablelands region of NSW, including Yass, Bungendore and Queanbeyan. The 5000 Watt AM signal travels as far as Braidwood, Cowra, Gundagai, Cooma and Goulburn. In addition to the AM transmission, 2CA also broadcasts from Black Mountain Tower in Digital (DAB+), as well as streaming its program on its website at www.2ca.com.au and other streaming platforms.

In 2019, 2CA and its sister station 2CC moved into state of the art purpose built studios on Bellenden Street, Crace, in a multi-million dollar broadcasting complex, the Canberra Radio Centre.

On 27 September 2021, 2CA was rebranded as 2JAB for the day to encourage people to get COVID-19 vaccinations.

== Programming ==
From its inception until the arrival of television in Canberra in 1962, 2CA was the only commercial broadcaster in the city. Its programming schedule for its first few decades followed a magazine format of news, light music, game shows, radio serials and comedy programs. National radio programmes like Pick-a-box, Nestlé's Theatre Royal, and Caltex Plays were staples on the station. The 2CA Book Club was a locally produced series featuring dramatised presentations of famous novels. For the Defence was produced in the 1950s featured fictionalised recreations of authentic criminal trials from the United States and Britain, presented from the viewpoint of the defence. Garema Airtime was a radio series broadcast from J.B. Young’s Emporium in Garema Place, Canberra.

=== Current Programs ===
As at November 2026, 2CA programs are a mix of local announcers, automation and announcers from across the Capital Radio Network.

==== Weekday ====
- 5:30am - 9am: The Classic Breakfast with Cathy Dinn (until end of 2026)
- 9am - 2pm: Michael Moffett
- 2pm - 7pm: Drive with Rob Duckworth (to be confirmed)
- 7pm - midnight: Forever Classic Nights

==== Saturday ====
- 6am - 9am: Classic Breakfast highlights
- 9am - 12pm: Andrew Deak
- 12pm - 6pm: Rob Duckworth
- 6pm - midnight: Juke Box Saturday Night

==== Sunday ====
- 6am - 9am: 70's Sunday Morning with Cathy Dinn (network-wide program)
- 9am - 12pm: Craig Prichard
- 12pm - 6pm: Andrew Deak

== Notable former announcers ==
Many well-known radio and television presenters have been former 2CA employees, including:

- Julian Abbott (ABC Radio)
- Larry Appley (MIX 106.3)
- John Blackman ("Hey Hey It's Saturday")
- Holger Brockmann (3XY, 2SM, 2JJ and ABC NewsRadio)
- Brian Bury ("Today")
- Tony Campbell (ABC Radio and Capital Television)
- Matthew Eggins (2CC, Capital Television and ABC Radio)
- Alan Fitzgerald (author and columnist)
- Daniel Gibson (Channel 7 Canberra)
- Dave Gosper (2CC, KIX-FM and FM104.7)
- Stan Grant (Channel 7, SBS, CNN and ABC)
- Mal Grieve (Capital Television)
- Leigh Hatcher (Channel 7 and Sky News)
- Frank Jones (Capital Television)
- Mike Larkan (Capital Television and Channel 10 Melbourne)
- Robert Lee ("Mythbusters")
- Peter Leonard (ABC Radio, ABC-TV and WIN-TV)
- Steve Liebmann ("Today")
- Wayne Mac (2CC, KIX-FM and ABC Radio)
- Terry Malcolm (ABC Radio and ABC-TV)
- Greg Robson (Capital Television)
- Ray Veldre (2CC and Capital Television)
