= Capital Radio Network =

Australian radio network

- Type: Radio
- Country: Australia
- Availability: Australian Capital Territory; Snowy Mountains and Southern Tablelands, New South Wales; Gippsland, Victoria; Perth, Western Australia,
- Owner: Blyton Group
- Official website: https://capitalradio.com.au/

Capital Radio Network is an Australian radio company, which owns stations in Canberra, Goulburn, Cooma, the Snowy Mountains, Gippsland and Perth. The company is a subsidiary of Blyton Group, with Kevin James Blyton as managing director for both. The company first acquired 2XL in the Snowy Mountains, as well as 2CC and 2CA in Canberra – the latter two offloaded from parent companies Australian Radio Network and Austereo respectively in order for them to establish a joint-venture to own stations 104.7 and Mix 106.3.

In February 2015, Capital Radio Network acquired Gippsland-based 3GG.

With the exception of XLFM, Snow FM and 3GG, all stations are operated as a 50/50 joint-venture with Grant Broadcasters.

== Owned and operated stations ==
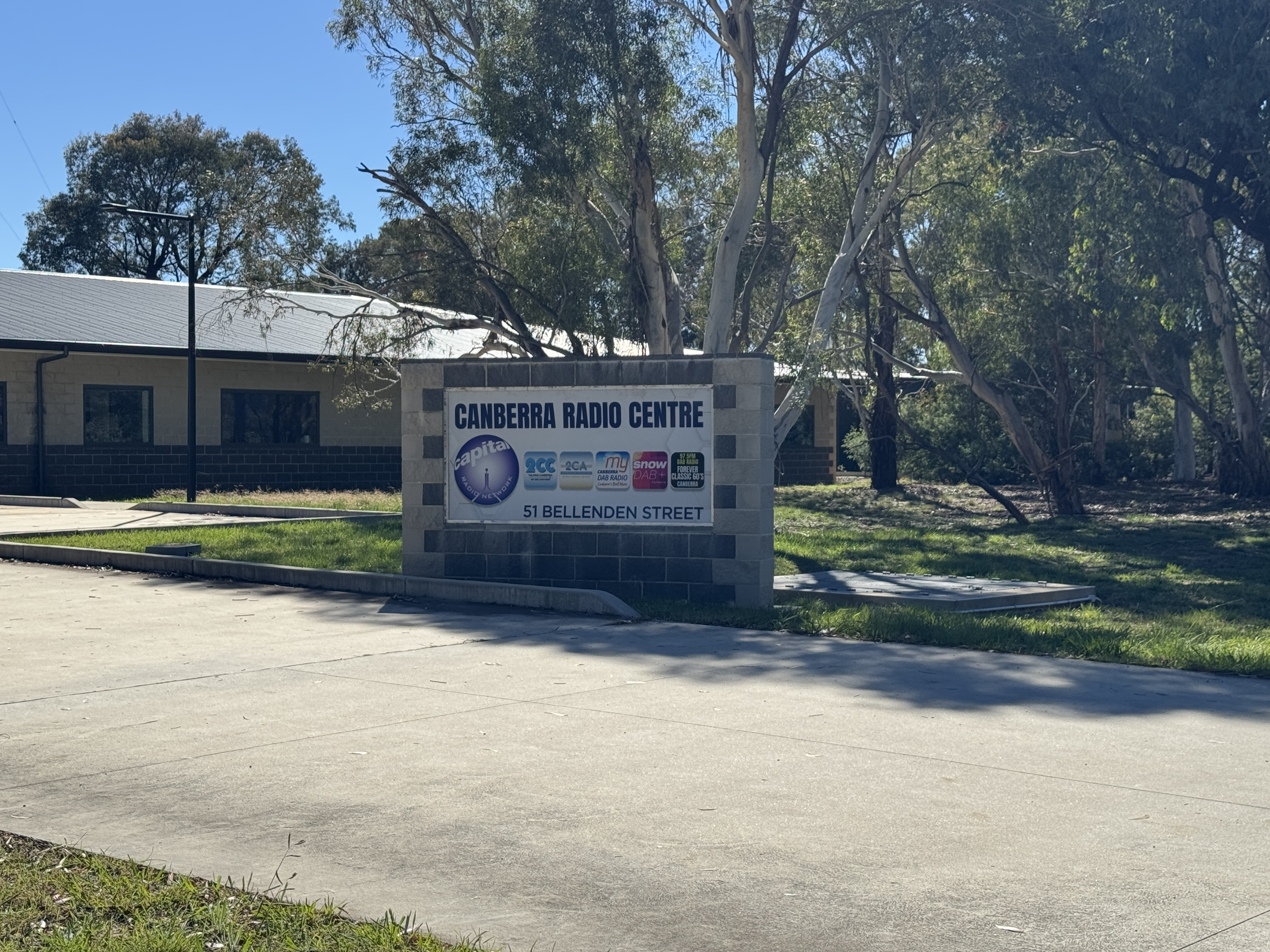
Canberra Radio Centre, 51 Bellenden Street, Gungahlin

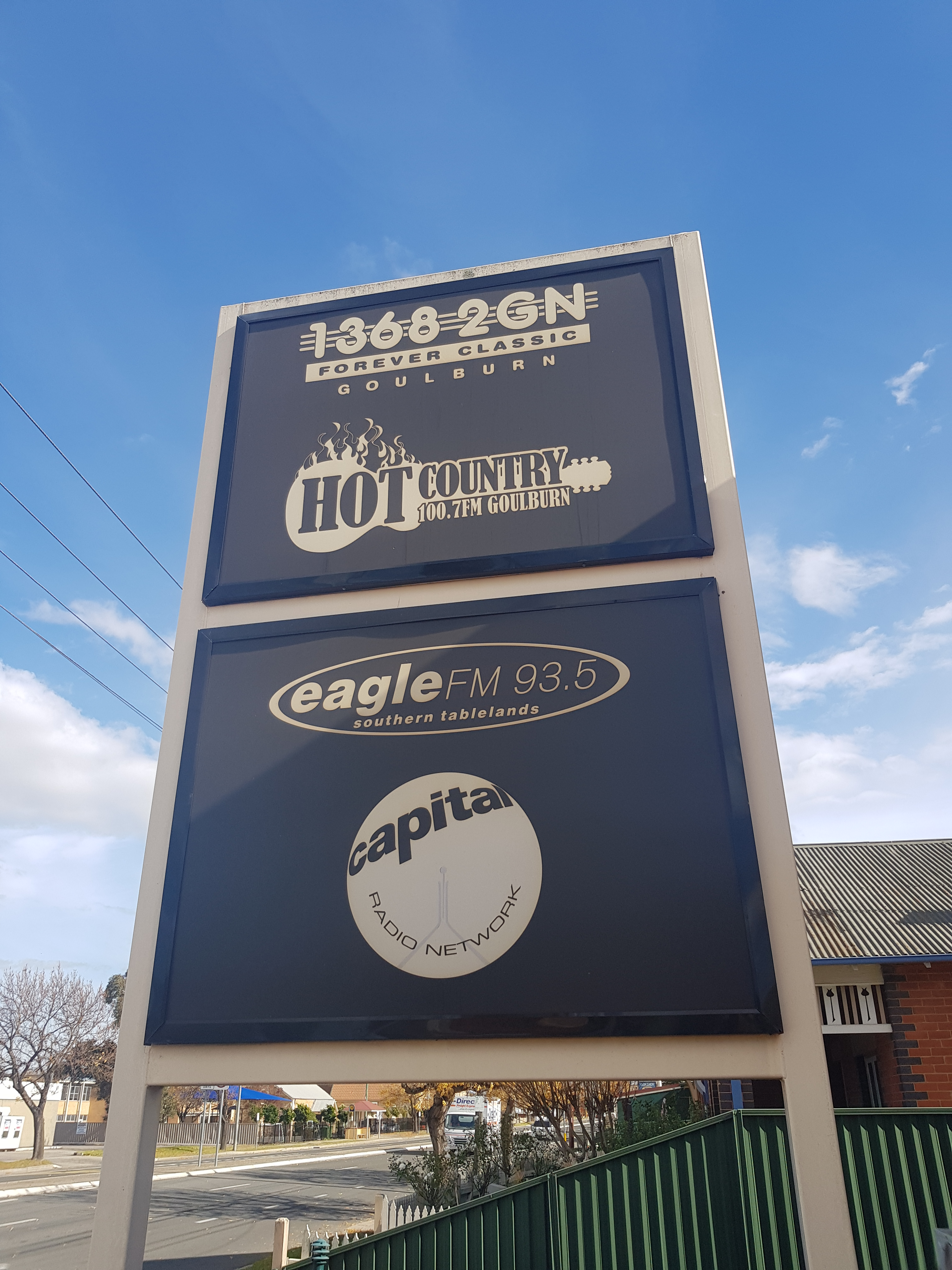
Signage outside the studio building for GNFM and Eagle FM in Goulburn, with the Capital Radio Network logo present.

- Canberra
  - 2CC Talking Canberra 1206 2CC – 1206AM and DAB+ (Note: 50% owned by Grant Broadcasters) 2cc.net.au
  - 2CA Forever Classic 2CA – 1053 AM and DAB+
  - Forever Classic 60s - 97.5FM and DAB+
  - Forever Classic 70s DAB+
  - My Canberra Digital DAB+
  - Snow FM, relayed on DAB+
- Cooma/Jindabyne/Snowy Mountains
  - XLFM
    - 96.1FM Cooma
    - 107.3FM Jindabyne
    - 98.7FM Perisher Valley
    - 92.1FM Thredbo
    - 92.5FM Bombala
    - 92.5FM Charlotte Pass
  - Snow FM
    - 97.7 FM, Cooma
    - 94.7FM Jindabyne
    - 101.9FM Perisher
    - 92.9FM Thredbo
    - 91.7FM Bombala
    - 91.7FM Charlotte Pass
    - DAB+ Canberra
  - KIX Country Radio – Cooma 87.6FM, Jindabyne 88.0FM
- Gippsland
  - 3GG 531 AM
- Goulburn
  - GNFM 107.7 FM
  - Eagle FM 93.5 FM
  - Forever Classic 60s - 100.7FM
  - Forever Classic 70s - 88.0 FM
- Perth
  - 6IX 1080 AM, 105.7FM & DAB+
  - Forever Classic 60s DAB+
  - Forever Classic 70s DAB+
  - My Perth Digital DAB+
  - X Digital DAB+

== Networks ==
Some Capital Radio Network stations broadcast identical formats and programming in the networks below:

Capital Hit Network – Contemporary Hit Radio (CHR)
Station	Frequency	Callsign	Studios	Broadcast Area
Snow FM	Various	2SKI	Jindabyne	Snowy Mountains
Eagle FM	93.5 FM	2SNO	Goulburn	Southern Tablelands
X Digital	DAB+	6IX	Perth	Perth

Forever Classic Metro Network – Classic Hits & Oldies
Station	Frequency	Callsign	Studios	Broadcast Area
2CA	1053 AM & DAB+	2CA	Canberra	Australian Capital Territory
6IX	1080 AM, 105.7 FM & DAB+	6IX	Perth	Perth

Forever Classic Regional Network – Classic Hits & Oldies
Station	Frequency	Callsign	Studios	Broadcast Area
XLFM	Various	2XXL	Jindabyne	Snowy Mountains
GNFM	107.7 FM	2GBN	Goulburn	Southern Tablelands
3GG	531 AM	3GG	Warragul	Gippsland and Latrobe Valley

MyDAB Radio – Adult Contemporary (AC)
Station	Frequency	Callsign	Studios	Broadcast Area
MyDAB Canberra	DAB+	2CC/2CA	Canberra	Australian Capital Territory
MyDAB Perth	DAB+	6IX	Perth	Perth

== Former stations ==
In the 1990s, Kevin Blyton held a 40% stake in Newcastle's NXFM.

Outside of buying and selling stations in the same stations/territories as current stations, he has also held stations in Tasmania and Queenstown, New Zealand.
