= Hit104.7 Canberra =

Radio station in Canberra, Australia

hit104.7
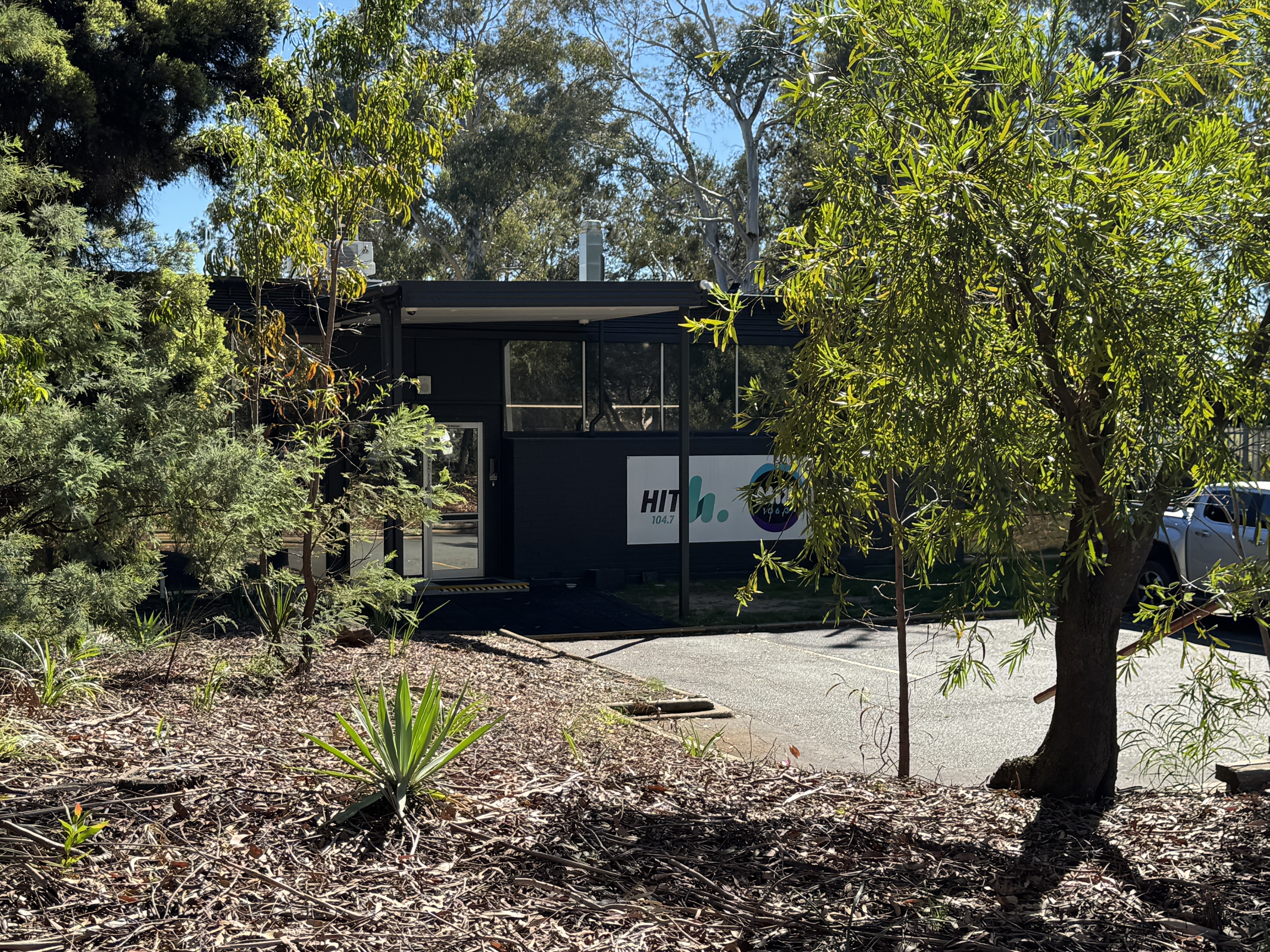
- Canberra, Australian Capital Territory; Australia
- Broadcast area: Canberra RA1 ()
- Frequencies: DAB+: 8D Canberra; FM: 104.7 MHz Canberra
- Branding: hit104.7

Programming
- Language: English
- Format: Top 40 (CHR)
- Affiliations: Hit Network

Ownership
- Owner: Southern Cross Austereo (50%) Australian Radio Network Pty Ltd (50%); (Canberra FM Radio Pty Ltd)
- Sister stations: Mix 106.3

History
- First air date: 27 February 1988

Technical information
- Licensing authority: Australian Communications and Media Authority
- ERP: 20,000 watts
- HAAT: 332 m
- Transmitter coordinates: 35°16′32″S 149°5′52″E
- Repeater: FM: 100.7 MHz Tuggeranong

Links
- Public licence information: Profile
- Website: Official website

hit104.7 (call sign: 2ROC) is a commercial FM radio station broadcasting in Canberra, Australian Capital Territory, Australia, on a frequency of 104.7 MHz, and is part of Southern Cross Austereo's Hit Network.

hit104.7 and sister station MIX 106.3 broadcast from Crace in the Australian Capital Territory.

== History ==
In 1987, Canberra radio station 2CA was awarded the licence to operate a supplementary FM service. The station was assigned the call-sign 2ROC and on-air branding FM104 (later changed to FM104.7). It commenced broadcasting on 27 February 1988 at 8 am on the frequency 104.7 MHz FM. FM104, along with rival KIX106, were the first new commercial FM radio stations to be licensed in Australia in eight years and were the first supplementary FM licences in Australia. Just a day before the station's launch, on Friday 26 February 1988, then-owner of 2CA, John Fairfax Ltd announced it had sold Macquarie Radio Network to a Queensland-based consortium, Sonance Ltd for an undisclosed sum believed to be in the region of $100 million.

On 11 March 1988, 2CA and FM104.7 were sold to then SA-based Austereo from Sonance Ltd for $15.25 million, with the sale being completed the following month. In June the results of the first survey since the introduction of the new FM stations gave FM104.7 9.5% of the radio audience with its rock music format, behind its sister station 2CA, with 11.6% of the radio audience with its news-talk format. Station manager of Macquarie Canberra, Greg St John, said the recent sale to Austereo had left the stations in 'financial limbo' and unable to package their product during the ratings period earlier in the year.

In the mid-1990s, due to AM radio's dwindling audience and the increasing popularity of the music based FM stations Austereo - owner of 104.7 & 2CA and ARN - owner of Mix 106.3 & 2CC, merged to form a joint venture ownership of both FM stations - Canberra FM Pty Ltd. The AM stations were sold off, moved to other premises and are currently owned by Capital Radio Network and Grant Broadcasters.

In December 2015, Southern Cross Austereo and Australian Radio Network announced that FM104.7 would rebrand to hit104.7 in 2016.

On Monday 18 January 2016, hit104.7 launched with a new breakfast show, Ryan & Tanya, as the station joined the Hit Network. As well as a new name and branding it gives the station even greater access to the network's on-air, online and social content. From 4 December 2017 until 27 October 2023, the hit104.7 breakfast show was hosted by Ned & Josh, after Ryan & Tanya left the station and Canberra in November 2017.

On 14 April 2021, it was revealed that the station lost to Mix 106.3 in the Canberra radio ratings.

On 30 October 2023, Ned & Josh's show was reportedly axed by hit104.7. Former Mix 106.3 drive hosts, Wilko and Courts joined the station in 2024, after a two-year absence from Canberra radio, replacing Ned & Josh. Wilko and Courts debuted on hit104.7 on 8 January 2024, but they resigned at the end of the year, with their role being taken by Rod and Gabi.

== Skyfire ==
Since its debut in 1989, the station sponsors the annual Skyfire event, broadcast from Regatta Point and Lake Burley Griffin. For the 2024 event, its sister station Mix 106.3 also sponsored Skyfire.
