= Hitz939 =

Radio station in Bundaberg, Australia

Hitz939 (4RUM)
- Bundaberg, Australia; Australia
- Broadcast area: Bundaberg
- Frequency: 93.9 MHz
- Branding: Hitz 939

Programming
- Format: Hot adult contemporary

Ownership
- Owner: ARN; (Bundaberg Broadcasters Pty. Ltd.)
- Sister stations: 4BU

History
- First air date: 29 March 1993

Technical information
- ERP: 3,000 watts
- HAAT: 35 m
- Transmitter coordinates: 24°50′42″S 152°25′34″E

Links
- Website: www.hitz939.com.au

Hitz939 is a radio station operated by ARN in Bundaberg, Australia.

Using the callsign 4RUM, Hitz939 is notable for being the first commercial FM licence in the Bundaberg region. Commencing broadcast on 29 March 1993 as a rock format station Hitz FM 93.9, the first song broadcast was "We Built This City" by Starship.

Since then, the station has moved towards a Hot Adult Contemporary format, playing a mix of 1980s, 1990s, 2000s and new music appealing to a 25–40 audience.

In November 2021, Hitz939, along with other stations owned by Grant Broadcasters, were acquired by the Australian Radio Network. This deal allows Grant's stations, including Hitz939, to access ARN's iHeartRadio platform in regional areas. The deal was finalized on 4 January 2022. It is expected Hitz939 will integrate with ARN's KIIS Network, but will retain its current name according to the press release from ARN.

Hitz939 broadcasts exclusively local content through the day, plus Fitzy and Wippa and Australia's number 1 drive show, Kate, Tim & Marty, and The Random 30 and OzMade in the evenings. The station studios are located at 38 Crofton St, Bundaberg.

== Ratings ==
In survey results released on 12 July 2016, Hitz939 was found to be Bundaberg's most listened to station, with 23.3% of the audience. Hitz939 also led in the Breakfast and Workday timeslots and on weekends.

Hitz939 also had the highest 10+ cumulative audience, with 28,300 listeners.
