= 3GG =

- Warragul, Victoria, Australia; Australia
- Broadcast area: Gippsland and the Latrobe Valley
- Frequency: 531 kHz AM
- Branding: 3GG

Programming
- Language: English
- Format: Classic hits

Ownership
- Owner: Capital Radio Network; (Radio Gippsland Pty Ltd)

History
- Former call signs: 3UL (1937–1989)
- Call sign meaning: 3 – Victoria; Greater Gippsland

Technical information
- ERP: 5 kW

Links
- Website: www.3gg.com.au

3GG is an Australian commercial radio station based in Warragul, Victoria. Founded in 1937 as 3UL, it has been owned by the Capital Radio Network since February 2015.

== History ==
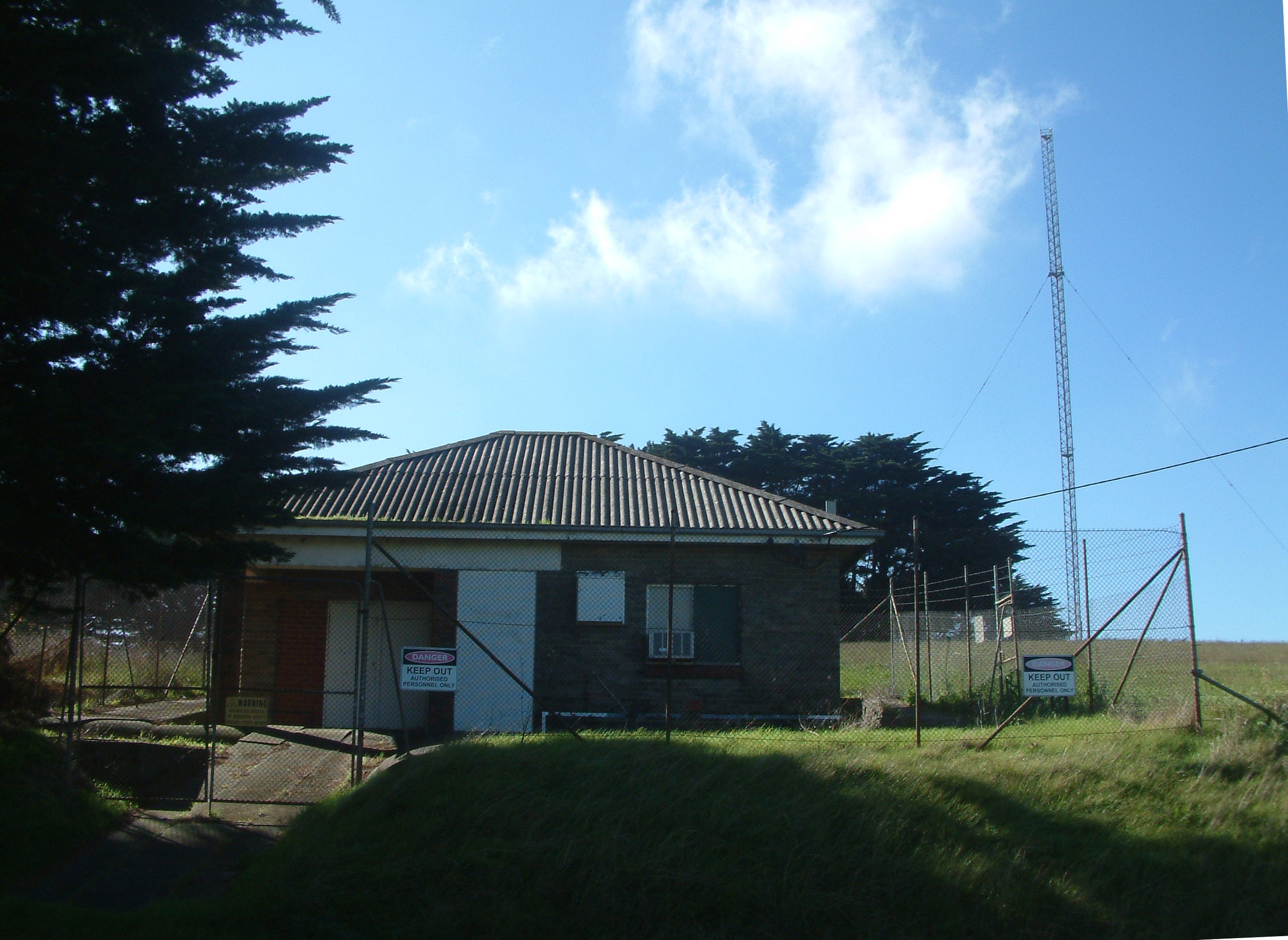
3GG Transmitter site on Brandy Creek Road

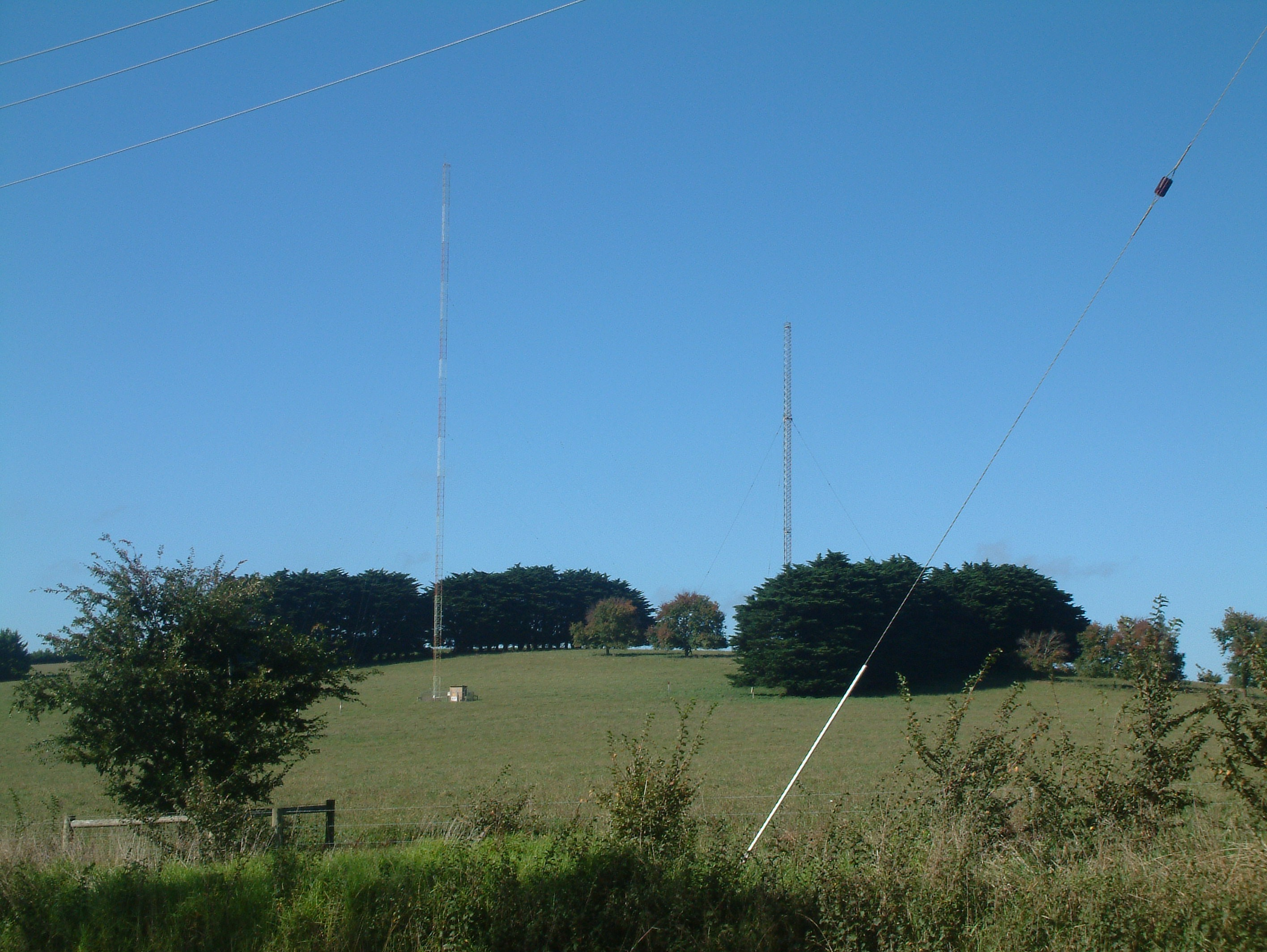
3GG antenna masts

3GG first went to air in 1937 as 3UL, named after the town from which it then broadcast; Warragul. 3UL's founder was Vic Dinenny. Dinenny had earlier operated 3YB as a mobile station, broadcasting from various towns around Victoria. As more and more rural stations opened in Victoria, the concept of a mobile station became less practical. Therefore, Dinenny applied for and received licences for two non-mobile (or conventional) stations, one in Warrnambool, which kept the 3YB call sign, and the other being 3UL in Warragul, which used the last two letters of the town name as its call sign.

Within a few years of opening, 3UL became part of the Argus Broadcasting Services network, along with 3YB Warrnambool and 3SR Shepparton. This Victorian rural radio network was operated by The Argus, then a daily newspaper. When The Argus closed in January 1957, their radio network evolved into the Associated Broadcasting Company which owned 3UL until it was sold to Regional Communications Pty Ltd in 1982. In August 1988 it was purchased by Shepparton Broadcasting. Wesgo purchased a 60% shareholding in March 1990. In 1990 the station was purchased by two private shareholders. In November 1989, 3UL moved premises from Warragul to Traralgon, in the Latrobe Valley, and changed its callsign to 3GG. Under Program Director, Steve Woods, 3GG became the number one station in the listening area.

After ten years, 3GG returned to Warragul. In 2002, owners RG Capital launched sister station Sea FM. In 2004, both 3GG and Sea FM were purchased by Macquarie Regional RadioWorks – the only change being to Sea FM, which was rebranded as Star FM.

Because of changes in media law, and following the purchase of Southern Cross Ten by Macquarie Southern Cross Media, either Sea FM or 3GG would have to be sold – the latter was sold to Resonate Broadcasting, a new entity operated by Austereo executives Guy Dobson and Rex Morris. Due to Resonate's Austereo connections – and following the merger of Southern Cross Media Group and Austereo – the station was closely aligned to the Triple M network.

In February 2015, 3GG was acquired by the Capital Radio Network. As a result, the station shifted music formats from adult contemporary to classic hits, in line with other network stations.

=== Transmitter and studios ===
While the transmitter location has always remained on Brandy Creek Road just north of Warragul, the studio location has over the years changed from Warragul to Traralgon and back to Warragul at its current location of 7/61 Smith Street, Warragul. Its reception can be heard in Melbourne and Geelong, plus King Island.

== Notable presenters ==
=== Current ===
Local programming is produced and broadcast from 3GG's studios in Smith Street, Warragul 24/7 with announcers presenting from 5:30am to midnight on weekdays and 6am to 6pm on weekends.

The station's presenters include Andrew Deak, Craig Prichard, Macka Dixon, Weekends: John Banks & Brad Martin,

=== Former ===
- Don Kilgour (Member for Shepparton)
- John Vertigan (retired)
- Madeleine Burke
- Ron Bond
- Peter Leslie (2DU)
- Ken Austin
- Andy Johns
- Daniel Gunn (SA-FM, PM-FM, 96FM, 91.7 The Wave)
- Stuart Baker (soundaudiosolutions.com.au)
- Bob Cornish
- Brendan Atch
- Peter Landy
- David Font (2AAA)
- Max Taylor
- Leigh Drew (3AW, 3AK)
- Gary Nicholls
- David Johns
- Mike Nicholls
- Malcolm T. Elliott
- Graham Lever
- John Doherty
- Mark Vale
- Tony Osler
- Peter O'Callaghan (3MP)
- Peter Grace
- Ashley Malone
- Greg Allen (TRFM / Gold 1242)
- Ron Burke (3AW)
- Steve Murphy (2GB)
- Andrew Ogilvie
- Toni Pippicelli (Nova 96.9)
- Diana Simons (Australian Traffic Network)
- Pat Penneta (3AW)
- Amanda Penneta (3AW)
- Fifi Box (Fox FM)
- James Clothier
- Darren Harding
- Kate Neubaur
- Jon Martin (analogue/digital conversion '97)
- Steve O'Halloran
- Lauren Setches (Ace Radio Hamilton)
- Brendan McIntosh (Ace Radio Hamilton)
- Mike Harris
- Nick Swanson
- Steve Woods (MCM Media)
- Mark Vale
- Simon Diaz (Smooth 91.5)
- Belinda King
- Steve Mac (McNamara) (Light FM)
- Mark Hyland (K Rock 95.5)
- John Blackman (Magic 1278)
- Jeff Cooper
- Mark Skurnik
- Phil Dickson
- Matt Cameron
- Rod Bear
- Chris Guy
- Matty Wray
- Toni Irwin
- Jenni Burchell
- Trent McCurdy
- Aaron Chilcott
