= 2DU =

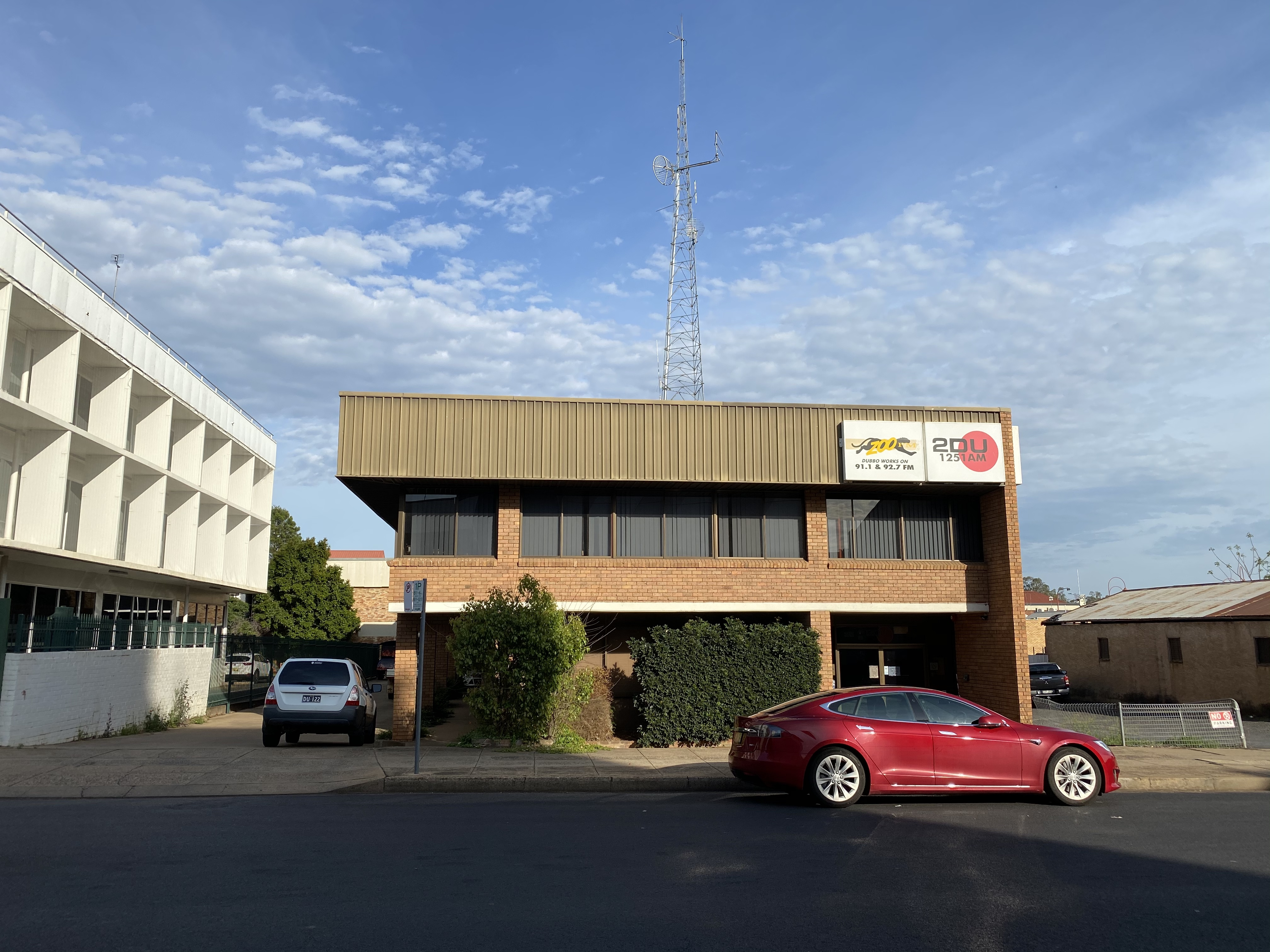
- Zoo FM and 2DU studios on Carrington Ave
- Dubbo, New South Wales; Australia
- Frequency: 1251 kHz

Programming
- Language: English
- Format: Talkback, Easy Listening

Ownership
- Sister stations: Zoo FM

History
- First air date: 3 July 1936
- Former frequencies: 1060 kHz; 1250 kHz

Technical information
- ERP: 2kW
- Transmitter coordinates: 32.2725°S 148.6755°E

Links
- Website: www.2du.com.au

2DU is an Australian radio station serving the Dubbo region. It was opened in July 1936.

There is a translator station at Cobar broadcasting on 972 kHz.
