= Mark Levy (reporter) =

American journalist

Marc Levy
- Occupation: Journalist
- Notable credit: Associated Press

Marc Levy is a prominent journalist in Pennsylvania, working for the Associated Press.

In 2008, the political website PolitickerPA.com named him one of the "Most Powerful Political Reporters" in Pennsylvania.
