= 6IX (radio station) =

Coordinates: 31.9593°S 115.8738°E

- Perth, Western Australia; Australia
- Frequencies: 1080 kHz AM; DAB+

Programming
- Language: English
- Format: Classic hits, oldies

Ownership
- Owner: Capital Radio Network (50%); Grant Broadcasters (50%); (Radio Perth Pty Ltd)
- Sister stations: 60's Music DAB; 70's Music DAB

History
- First air date: 27 November 1933
- Call sign meaning: 6 for Western Australia plus "IX" for "six"

Technical information
- Licensing authority: ACMA
- Power: 2 kW
- Repeaters: 105.7 FM Rockingham; 105.7 FM Wanneroo

Links
- Public licence information: Profile
- Website: www.6ix.com.au

6IX (stylised as 6iX) is a commercial radio station in Perth, Western Australia, broadcasting a classic hits and oldies format from its studios in Osborne Park. First broadcast in 1933, the station is currently owned and operated as a joint venture by Capital Radio Network and Grant Broadcasters.

== History ==
6IX was first opened on 27 November 1933 by John Kirwan, the then-President of the Western Australian Legislative Council. Operated by W.A. Broadcasters Ltd, the station first broadcast on 1240 kHz AM, until 1935 when it moved to 1080 AM. In 1970 TVW enterprises bought 6IX and moved it to its studios in Tuart Hill. In the mid-1980s it moved to 169 Hay Street, East Perth where 6PR and 96FM are today broadcast from. By this stage it was owned by the Bell Group.

In 1988, 6IX was bought by Austereo, with a view to obtaining one of the two AM-FM conversions licences to be made available in Perth. Austereo assigned the station a new callsign, 6GL, and the station was branded on-air as The Eagle 1080 AM. However, Austereo failed to obtain one of the AM-FM conversions on auction and subsequently sold the radio station to regional operator RadioWest, who reinstated the original 6IX callsign.

In 1996, 6IX was purchased by Southern Cross Broadcasting. In 1998 it was purchased by the Capital Radio Network and Grant Broadcasters.
