= XLFM =

Radio station in Cooma, Australia

XLFM (2XXL)
- Cooma, New South Wales; Australia
- Broadcast area: The Snowy Mountains
- Frequency: 96.1 MHz

Programming
- Format: Classic hits

Ownership
- Owner: Capital Radio Network; (Radio Snowy Mountains Pty Ltd)
- Sister stations: 97.7 Snow FM

History
- First air date: 22 August 1937
- Former call signs: 2XL (1937–2019)
- Former frequencies: 918 kHz
- Call sign meaning: 2 for New South Wales, XXL from former 2XL call sign on AM

Technical information
- Licensing authority: Australian Communications & Media Authority
- ERP: 45,000 watts
- Transmitter coordinates: 36.2397°S 149.1489°E
- Repeaters: 107.3 FM (Jindabyne); 92.1 FM (Thredbo); 98.7 FM (Perisher Valley); 92.5 FM (Charlotte Pass); 92.5 FM (Bombala); 99.1 FM (Mount Selwyn)

Links
- Website: www.2xl.com.au

XLFM (formerly 2XL) is an Australian radio station serving the Cooma region owned by Capital Radio Network. It was opened in August 1937.

The station was originally broadcasting from Cooma on 920 kHz, later moving to 918 kHz, AM under the callsign '2XL' before undergoing an FM conversion in 2019. Coinciding with the move to FM, 2XL re-branded to XLFM.

XLFM is a part of the regional 'Forever Classic' network of Capital Radio Network Stations and acts as its programming hub.

== Transmitter and studios ==
XLFM has numerous transmitter locations repeating the broadcast on 96.1 FM. The repeater transmitters are found in Jindabyne, Thredbo, Charlotte Pass, Perisher Valley, Bombala and Mount Selwyn. The studio location has over the years changed from Cooma to Jindabyne which is its current location of Kosciuszko Road, Jindabyne. The Jindabyne studios are shared with its sister station Snow FM.

== Announcers ==
- Gary Warne
- Brad Martin
- John Banks
- Andrew Deak
- Craig Prichard
- Macka Dixon (Fills)
