= Grant Broadcasters =

Australian radio company

- Industry: Radio
- Founded: 1942
- Founder: Walter Grant
- Headquarters: Sydney, Australia
- Area served: Regional Australia
- Key people: Alison Cameron (CEO)
- Revenue: $101 million (2021)
- Net income: $36 million (2021)
- Owner: Grant family
- Number of employees: 700 (2021)
- Subsidiaries: See below
- Website: www.grantbroadcasters.com.au

Grant Broadcasters is an Australian regional radio network. Founded in 1942, by 2019 it owned 53 radio stations. In 2022, it sold 46 to Here, There & Everywhere, retaining shareholdings in seven in Canberra, Geelong, Goulburn and Perth.

== History ==
Grant Broadcasters was founded by Walter Grant in 1942 when he bought 2DU in Dubbo. In 1972, a shareholding in 2ST in Nowra was purchased followed in 1979 by 2PK in Parkes and in 1982 2MG in Mudgee. In 1986, 2DU, 2PK and 2MG were sold with full ownership taken of 2ST. Over the next three decades, the company expanded through acquisition, purchasing radio stations in all states and territories of Australia, owning 53 stations by November 2021. In November 2021, Grant Broadcasters agreed terms to sell 46 stations to Here, There & Everywhere (HTE). The deal was finalised on 4 January 2022, with HTE integrating the stations purchased into its ARN Regional business. As part of the sale, Grant Broadcasters took a 12% shareholding in HTE.

== Radio stations ==
Grant Broadcasters owns three radio stations outright:

- Bay FM, Geelong
- K Rock 95.5, Geelong
- 3GL 1341AM, Geelong

It also owns 50% in five stations in a joint venture with Capital Radio Network.

- Eagle FM, Goulburn
- 2CA, Canberra
- 2CC, Canberra
- GNFM, Goulburn
- 6IX, Perth

== Investments ==
- ARN Media (12%)
