= List of radio station callsigns in Queensland =

The following is a list of Australian radio station callsigns beginning with the number 4, indicating radio stations in the state of Queensland.

Callsign	Area served	Frequency	Band	On-air ID	Purpose	Site
4AA	Mackay	1026	AM	4MK	Commercial	
4AAA	Brisbane	098.9	FM	98.9 FM	Community	
4ABC	Gold Coast	091.7	FM	ABC Gold Coast	National	
4ABCFM	Queensland	various	FM	ABC Classic FM	National	
4ABCRN	Queensland	various	FM	ABC Radio National	National	
4ABCRR	Queensland	various	FM	ABC Local Radio	National	
4ACR	Remote Aboriginal and Torres Strait Islander communities	various	FM	National Indigenous Radio Service	Community	
4AK	Toowoomba	1242	AM	4AK	Commercial	
4AM	Atherton	0558	AM	4AM	Commercial	
4AMM	Atherton	097.9	FM	Hit97.9 Tablelands	Commercial	
4AT	Atherton	0720	AM	ABC Far North Queensland	National	
4BAY	Wynnum/Redlands	100.3	FM	Bay FM	Community	
4BBB	Brisbane	105.3	FM	B105	Commercial	
4BC	Brisbane	1116	AM	4BC	Commercial	
4BCR	Bundaberg	094.7	FM	94.7 FM	Community	
4BFM	Brisbane	097.3	FM	97.3 FM	Commercial	
4BH	Brisbane	0882	AM	4BH	Commercial	
4BNE	Brisbane	106.9	FM	Nova	Commercial	
4BRR	GayndahGayndah	091.5	FM	Burnett River Radio	Community	
4BRZ	Remote Commercial Radio Service North East Zone	various	FM	Breeze FM	Commercial	
4BSR	Beaudesert	101.5	FM	Beau FM	Community	
4BU	Bundaberg	1332	AM	4BU	Commercial	
4CAB	Gold Coast	107.3	FM	Juice 107.3	Community	
4CBL	Logan	101.1	FM	101 FM	Community	
4CC	Gladstone	0927	AM	4CC	Commercial	
4CCA	Cairns	102.7	FM	Star 102.7	Commercial	
4CCC	Charleville	101.7	FM	Triple C	Commercial	
4CCR	Cairns	089.1	FM	Cairns FM	Community	
4CEE	Maryborough	101.9	FM	hit101.9 Fraser Coast	Commercial	
4CH	Charleville	0603	AM	ABC Western Queensland	National	
4CHT	Charters Towers	095.9	FM	Hit95.9	Commercial	
4CIM	Cairns	098.7	FM	BBM 98.7	Community	
4CLG	Nambour	106.5	FM	Salt 106.5	Community	
4CRB	Gold Coast	089.3	FM	4CRB	Community	
4CRM	Mackay	107.5	FM	4CRM	Community	
4CSB	Wondai	090.7	FM	Crow FM	Community	
4DDB	Toowoomba	102.7	FM	102.7 FM	Community	
4DDD	Dalby	089.9	FM	4DDD	Community	
4EB	Brisbane	098.1	FM	4EB	Community	
4EL	Cairns	0846	AM	4CA	Commercial	
4FC	Maryborough	1161	AM	Radio TAB	Commercial	
4FCR	Hervey Bay	107.5	FM	Fraser Coast FM	Community	
4FRB	Brisbane	096.5	FM	96five	Community	
4GC	Charters Towers	0828	AM	4GC	Commercial	
4GCR	Gympie	091.5	FM	Cooloola Christian Radio	Community	
4GEM	Bowen	095.1	FM	Gem FM	Community	
4GLD	Gold Coast	092.5	FM	Triple M	Commercial	
4GM	Gympie	1566	AM	ABC Wide Bay	National	
4GOD	Toowoomba	092.9	FM	Voice FM	Community	
4GR	Toowoomba	0864	AM	Triple M Darling Downs 864 (Previously 4GR)	Commercial	
4GY	Gympie	0558	AM	4GY	Commercial	
4HI	Emerald	1143	AM	4HI	Commercial	
4HIT	Emerald	094.7	FM	Hit Central Qld	Commercial	
4HOT	Cairns	103.5	FM	Hit 103.5	Commercial	
4HTB	Gold Coast	102.9	FM	Hot Tomato	Commercial	
4HU	Hughenden	1485	AM	ABC North West Queensland	National	
4ISA	Mount Isa	106.5	FM	ABC North West Queensland	National	
4JJJ	Queensland	various	FM	Triple J	National	
4JK	Julia Creek	0567	AM	ABC North West Queensland	National	
4KIG	Townsville	107.1	FM	4K1G	Community	
4KQ	Brisbane	0693	AM	4KQ	Commercial	
4KRY	Kingaroy	089.1	FM	Hit89.1 South Burnett	Commercial	
4KZ	Innisfail	0531	AM	4KZ	Commercial	
4LG	Longreach	1098	AM	4LG	Commercial	
4LM	Mount Isa	0666	AM	4LM	Commercial	
4LRE	Longreach	104.5	FM	West FM	Commercial	
4MBB	Maryborough	103.5	FM	Triple M Fraser Coast	Commercial	
4MBS	Brisbane	103.7	FM	4MBS Classic FM	Community	
4MCY	Nambour	091.1	FM	Hot 91	Commercial	
4MET	Gold Coast	105.7	FM	Radio Metro	Community	
4MIC	Mount Isa	102.5	FM	Hit102.5	Commercial	
4MIX	Ipswich	094.9	FM	River 94.9	Commercial	
4MKY	Mackay	100.3	FM	Hit100.3	Commercial	
4MMK	Mackay	101.9	FM	Star 101.9	Commercial	
4MMM	Brisbane	104.5	FM	Triple M	Commercial	
4MOB	Mount Isa	100.9	FM	Mob FM	Community	
4MS	Mossman	0639	AM	ABC Far North Queensland	National	
4MUR	Mackay	105.9	FM	My 105	Community	
4MW	Torres Strait	1260	AM	4MW	Community	
4NAG	Yeppoon	091.3	FM	Radio NAG	Community	
4NNN	Gympie/Nambour	096.1	FM	Zinc 96.1	Commercial	
4NSA	Noosa	101.3	FM	101.3 FM	Community	
4OUR	Caboolture	101.5	FM	101.5 FM	Community	
4PB	Queensland	various	AM	ABC NewsRadio	National	
4PIB	Palm Island	097.3	FM	Bwgcolman Radio	Community	
4PNN	Queensland	various	FM	ABC NewsRadio	National	
4QAA	Mackay	101.1	FM	ABC Tropical North	National	
4QB	Bundaberg	0855	AM	ABC Wide Bay	National	
4QBB	Wide Bay	100.1	FM	ABC Wide Bay	National	
4QCC	Cairns	106.7	FM	ABC Far North Queensland	National	
4QD	Emerald	1548	AM	ABC Capricornia	National	
4QL	Longreach	0540	AM	ABC Western Queensland	National	
4QN	Townsville	0630	AM	ABC North Queensland	National	
4QO	Eidsvold	0855	AM	ABC Wide Bay	National	
4QR	Brisbane	0612	AM	ABC Brisbane	National	
4QS	Toowoomba	0747	AM	ABC Southern Queensland	National	
4QW	Roma/St. George	0711	AM	ABC Western Queensland	National	
4QY	Cairns	0801	AM	ABC Far North Queensland	National	
4RBL	Remote Commercial Radio Service North East Zone	various	FM	Rebel FM	Commercial	
4RED	Redcliffe	099.7	FM	99Seven FM	Community	
4RFM	Moranbah	096.9	FM	4RFM	Community	
4RGB	Bundaberg	093.1	FM	Triple M	Commercial	
4RGC	Cairns	099.5	FM	Triple M	Commercial	
4RGD	Toowoomba	100.7	FM	Hit Darling Downs (Previously CFM)	Commercial	
4RGK	Rockhampton	101.5	FM	Triple M	Commercial	
4RGL	Gladstone	091.9	FM	Fresh FM	Community	
4RGM	Mackay	098.7	FM	Triple M	Commercial	
4RGR	Townsville	100.7	FM	Power 100	Commercial	
4RGT	Townsville	106.3	FM	Star 106.3	Commercial	
4RIM	Boonah	100.1	FM	Rim FM	Community	
4RK	Rockhampton	0837	AM	ABC Capricornia	National	
4RN	Brisbane	0792	AM	ABC Radio National	National	
4RO	Rockhampton	0990	AM	4RO	Commercial	
4ROK	Rockhampton	107.9	FM	Hit Central Qld	Commercial	
4ROM	Roma	095.1	FM	Hit 95.1 Maranoa	Commercial	
4RPH	Brisbane	1296	AM	4RPH	Community	
4RR	Charleville	105.7	FM	4RR	Community	
4RUM	Bundaberg	093.9	FM	Hitz FM	Commercial	
4SB	Kingaroy	1071	AM	4SB	Commercial	
4SBSFM	Brisbane	093.3	FM	SBS Radio	National	
4SCR	Nambour	090.3	FM	ABC Sunshine Coast	National	
4SDB	Warwick	089.3	FM	Rose City FM	Community	
4SEA	Gold Coast	090.9	FM	Sea FM	Commercial	
4SEE	Nambour	091.9	FM	Sea FM	Commercial	
4SFM	Nambour	104.9	FM	Sunshine FM	Community	
4SSS	Nambour	092.7	FM	Mix FM	Commercial	
4TAB	Brisbane	1008	AM	Radio TAB	Commercial	
4TCB	Townsville	099.9	FM	Live FM	Community	
4TI	Torres Strait	1062	AM	ABC Far North Queensland	National	
4TOO	Townsville	102.3	FM	4TO	Commercial	
4TSV	Townsville	103.1	FM	Hit 103.1	Commercial	
4TTT	Townsville	103.9	FM	Triple T	Community	
4TVR	Mareeba	092.3	FM	92.3 FM	Community	
4US	Rockhampton	100.7	FM	US FM	Community	
4VL	Charleville	0918	AM	4VL	Commercial	
4WBR	Maryborough	105.1	FM	Rhema FM	Community	
4WHO	Yarraman	099.7	FM	Wild Horse FM	Community	
4WK	Warwick/Toowoomba	0963	AM	4WK	Commercial	
4WP	Weipa	1044	AM	ABC Far North Queensland	National	
4YB	Brisbane	1197	AM	1197 AM	Community	
4YOU	Rockhampton	098.5	FM	4YOU	Community	
4ZKZ	Innisfail	098.3	FM	Kool FM	Commercial	
4ZR	Roma	1476	AM	4ZR	Commercial	
4ZZZ	Brisbane	102.1	FM	4ZZZ	Community	
WTF	Norfolk Island	87.6	FM	Watawieh FM	Narrowcast	

== Defunct Callsigns ==
Callsign	Area served	Frequency	Band	Fate	Freq currently	Purpose
4AT	Atherton		AM	Shut down in 1941	4AT (National)	Commercial
4AY	Ayr/Townsville	0891	AM	Changed call to 4RR in 1987	see 4RR	Commercial
4BCB	Blackwater	092.7	FM	Shut down in 2008	silent	Community
4BK	Brisbane	1296	AM	Moved to FM in 1990 as 4BBB	4RPH	Commercial
4BI	Brisbane	1197	AM	Changed callsign to 4YB in 2017	4YB	Community
4BVR	Esk	095.9	FM	Shut down in 2018	silent	Community
4CA	Cairns	0846	AM	Moved to FM in 1998 as 4CCA	4EL	Commercial
4CD	Gladstone	0927	AM	Changed call to 4CC in 1985 or 1986	4CC	Commercial
4EB	Brisbane	1053	AM	Moved to FM in 2002, retained call	Rete Italia (HPON)	Community
4EEE	Emerald	096.3	FM	Shut down in 2009	silent	Community
4GG	Gold Coast	1197	AM	Moved to FM in 1989 as 4GGG	4YB (Brisbane)	Commercial
4GGG	Gold Coast	092.5	FM	Changed call to 4GLD in 1993	4GLD	Commercial
4IO	Brisbane	1008	AM	Changed call back to 4IP in 1989	see 4IP	Commercial
4IP	Ipswich/Brisbane	1008	AM	Call was 4IO from 1978 to 1989; Changed call to 4TAB in 1992	4TAB	Commercial
4JAZ	Gold Coast	094.1	FM	Shut down in 2013	TCBL	Community
4MB	Maryborough	1161	AM	Moved to FM in 2000 as 4MBB	4FC	Commercial
4MI	Mount Isa	1080	AM	Moved to FM in 1990s as 4ISA	silent	National
4MIG	Mount Isa	105.7	FM	Shut down in 2017	silent	Community
4MK	Mackay	1026	AM	Moved to FM in 1999 as 4MMK	4AA	Commercial
4NA	Nambour	0828	AM	Changed call to 4SS in 1984	see 4SS	Commercial
4QA	Mackay	0756	AM	Shut down in 1993 (4QAA opened in 1992)	silent	National
4QFM	Ipswich	106.9	FM	Moved to 94.9 MHz and changed call to 4MIX in 2001	4BNE	Commercial
4QG	Brisbane	0792	AM	Changed call to 4RN in 1991	4RN	National
4RR	Townsville	0891	AM	Moved to FM ca. 1993 as 4RAM	4TAB	Commercial
4RRR	Roma	101.7	FM	Shut down in 2006	silent	Community
4SDA	Nambour	104.9	FM	Changed call to 4SFM in 2007	4SFM	Community
4SO	Southport	1593	AM	Shut down ca. 1989. Became 91.7 ABC Coast FM	silent	National
4SS	Nambour	0828	AM	Moved to FM in 1995 as 4SSS	silent	Commercial
4SUN	Remote Commercial Radio Service North East Zone	various	FM	Changed call to 4RBL in 2003	4RBL	Commercial
4TO	Townsville	0774	AM	Moved to FM in 1999 as 4TOO	retransmission of 4TOO	Commercial
4TOF	Cunnamulla	099.7	FM	Shut down in 2006	retransmission of 4RR	Community
