= Triple M Central Queensland =

Coordinates: 23.3388°S 150.5779°E

Rockhampton, Queensland, Australia; Australia
- Broadcast area: Central Queensland
- Frequency: 101.5FM

Programming
- Format: Mainstream rock

Ownership
- Owner: Southern Cross Austereo
- Sister stations: Hit Central Queensland

History
- First air date: As Sea FM – 30 September 2000; As Triple M – 15 December 2016
- Call sign meaning: 4RGK

Technical information
- Repeaters: 95.1FM – Gladstone; 101.1FM – Mount Murchison

Links
- Website: https://www.triplem.com.au/centralqld

Triple M Central Queensland is a commercial radio station broadcasting from Rockhampton, Queensland, Australia. It is owned by Southern Cross Austereo and broadcasts an Adult Contemporary (AC) format. It features both locally produced content and nationally syndicated content. It has two repeaters, one at Gladstone (95.1FM) and Mount Murchison (101.1FM). It was previously known as '101.5/95.1 Sea FM' until it was rebranded as Triple M in December 2016, alongside many other Southern Cross Austereo stations.

== History ==
4RGK began test broadcasts in Rockhampton and Gladstone in September 2000, and officially launched as Sea FM in October 2000, broadcasting to the Rockhampton area on 101.5 FM and the Gladstone area on 95.1 FM.

When the station was launched, it was owned by RG Capital, which already owned the existing Rockhampton AM station 4RO.

A rival radio company, DMG Regional Radio, also launched their FM station in Rockhampton at the same time, with Hot FM beginning transmission in Central Queensland. RG Capital Radio and DMG Regional Radio both successfully bid for the FM licenses in 1998, eventually leading to the simultaneous launch of the two competing stations in 2000.

Unlike Sea FM, which began broadcasting a 'live and local' format from its Rockhampton studio between 5 am and 6 pm, Hot FM (now Hit Central Queensland) heavily relied on networking their daytime programming from its hub in Townsville. In 2005, RG Capital and DMG Regional Radio merged to become Macquarie Radioworks, and the two rival stations became stablemates. The merger also meant the two AM stations 4RO and 4CC were also owned by the same company, and as a result had to be offloaded and were later sold to Prime Media Group.

Since the original merger, a number of other mergers have occurred which has affected Sea FM's formatting. Macquarie and Southern Cross Broadcasting merged to become Macquarie Southern Cross Media, then Macquarie Southern Cross merged with Austereo to become Southern Cross Austereo.

Sea FM was rebranded as Triple M in December 2016, alongside many other Southern Cross Austereo stations.

== Programming ==
=== Music ===
Sea FM is skewed towards the 40+ demographic playing an adult contemporary format focusing on mainly rock music from the 1970s, 1980s and 1990s with some more recent music included, much similar to the music format of Triple M.

=== Shows ===
Sea FM's programs mainly originates from the local Rockhampton studio at the Rockhampton Media Centre, including the flagship Sea Morning Crew breakfast program, and the 9 am – midday morning program.

Some programs originate from sister stations Triple M Townsville, Triple M Gold Coast and the metropolitan Triple M stations. Weekend programming on Sea FM predominately consists of generic "Adult Contemporary" programming from the Gold Coast, with some network lifestyle programming also being broadcast on Sunday mornings.

Sea FM also broadcasts national National Rugby League coverage. NRL games featuring the North Queensland Cowboys are provided by 4TO FM's Cowboys Call Team while other NRL games are broadcast as part of the national Triple M Rock NRL sports programming from Triple M Sydney.

=== News ===
Sea FM produces a weekday local news service, with a Rockhampton-based journalist reading local news headlines on the hour from 6 am until 9 am, with full bulletins on the half-hour at 6:30 am, 7:30 am, 8:30 am. Local news is also broadcast during morning programming at 10 am and 11 am. The local news bulletins heard on Sea FM are also played on Hot FM CQ. The journalist is also responsible for preparing a separate local news service for the Mackay region, which is heard on Mackay's Sea FM station. All national news bulletins are provided by Southern Cross Austereo newsrooms in either Townsville or the Gold Coast.

=== Ratings ===
On 29 September 2016, ratings for the Central Queensland radio market were released. This was the first time since 2001 ratings for the local market had been calculated.

Sea FM performed best in the 40–54 demographic with 36.9% of audience share. The station also beat all its rivals in the 55–64 demographic with 24% of audience share, just ahead of ABC Capricornia on 23.9%. The timeslot where Sea FM attracted the most listeners was the midday–4 pm shift with 25.4% of audience share. The station's 9 am–midday timeslot was also the most listened-to morning program in Central Queensland, with 24.4% of audience share, just ahead of its sister station Hot FM which had 24.3%.

== Rebranding ==
On 26 September 2016, Southern Cross Austereo announced that Sea FM in Central Queensland would be rebranded to Triple M in mid-December, as part of a major national rebranding for the network's Localworks stations to enable the stations to fully align themselves with the metro Triple M stations. The name change took effect on 15 December 2016 – the station's first name change since its launch in October 2000.

== Past Sea FM morning crews ==
From the station's inception in 2000 until its rebranding to Triple M, thirteen duos have hosted the flagship Sea FM Morning Crew breakfast program. Most notably, these have included political advisor James Ashby, comedian Craig Low and former Big Brother Australia contestant Billy Bentley.

- James Ashby and Joanne Spargo
- Joanne Spargo and Aaron Stevens
- Aaron Stevens and Jonelle McKenzie
- Jonelle McKenzie and Craig Low
- Jonelle McKenzie and Paul Blunt
- Paul Blunt and Daniel Smith
- Daniel Smith and Mark Edwards
- Mark Edwards and Ryan Khay
- Mark Edwards and Brad Villiers
- Billy Bentley and Cath McGeorge
- Brad Villiers and Chris Banks
- Chris Banks and Todd Stevens
- Chris Banks and Shannon Neven
