= 4RO =

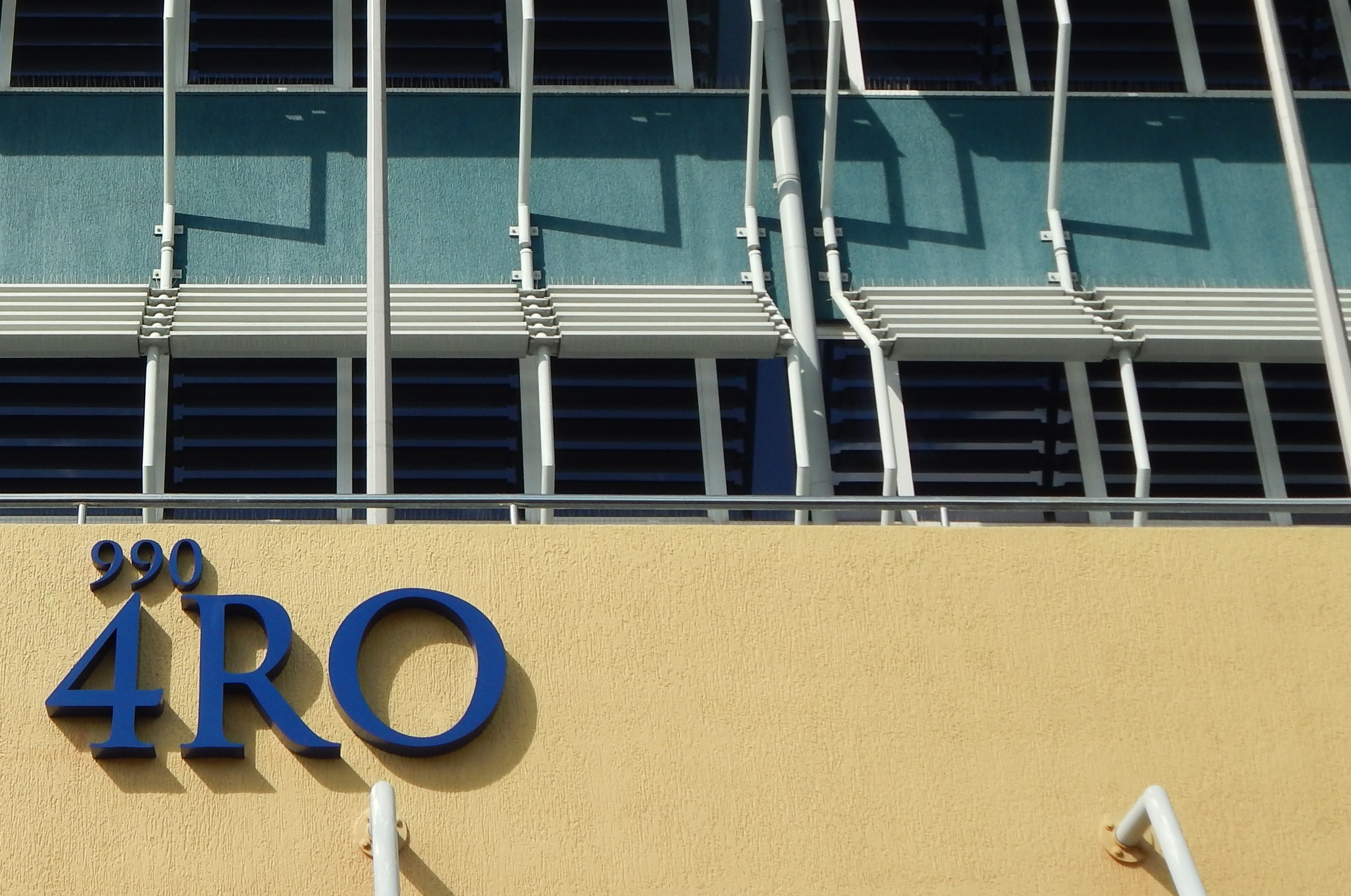
- Rockhampton, Queensland; Australia
- Broadcast area: Rockhampton RA1
- Frequency: 990 kHz
- Branding: The Talk of Central Queensland

Programming
- Format: Talk; Classic hits

Ownership
- Owner: ARN; (Radio Rockhampton Pty Ltd)
- Sister stations: 4CC; KIX Country

History
- First air date: 2 July 1932
- Former frequencies: 1340 kHz (1932–1935); 1330 kHz (1935–?)

Technical information
- Power: 5 kW
- Transmitter coordinates: 23°35′6″S 150°50′39″E

Links
- Website: www.4ro.com.au

4RO is an Australian AM radio station broadcasting to Central Queensland from Rockhampton on 990 kHz.

== History ==
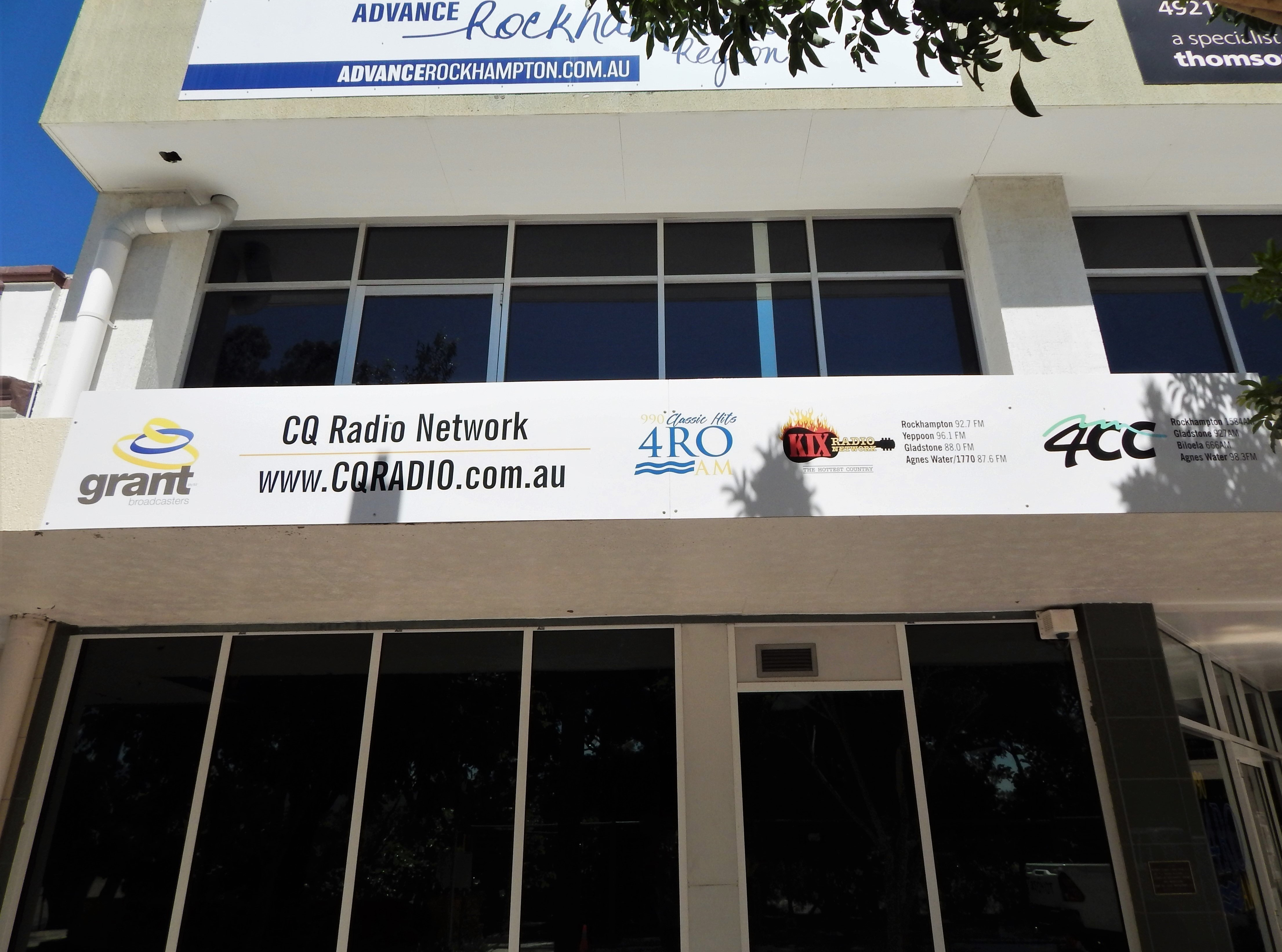
4RO studio at 220 Quay Street, 2020

=== Predecessors ===
The first known use of wireless in the Rockhampton vicinity was the wireless equipped (Marconi system) two destroyers, HMAS Yarra and HMAS Parramatta, of the Australia squadron of the Royal Navy when visiting Rockhampton in May 1911. The group was commanded by Lieutenant G. F. Hyde.

There were at least three licensed (and likely many unlicensed) early wireless experimenters at Rockhampton immediately prior to the outbreak of World War 1: L. Freeman (Callsign: XQB); Robert Henry Berry (Callsign: XQC); and H. A. Shepherd (Callsign: XQD). Operation was on longwave using spark transmission; there was no known use of telephony.

As part of the Australian Coastal Radio Network, station VIR Rockhampton commenced operation on 24 May 1913 from a transmitter site at The Range. The station provided service to coastal shipping in the region between VIB Brisbane and VIT Townsville. It operated on longwave and was a vital part of Australia's defence during World War 1.

A B class licence was granted to the Queensland Government in April 1925 for a Rockhampton station to relay, via landline, its A class station 4QG Brisbane. It was proposed to operate on a wavelength of 323 metres (928.8 kHz) with a transmitter input power of 500 watts (corresponds to a transmitter power of about 150 watts). The station was never implemented.

The earliest known broadcasting service at Rockhampton was an amateur broadcasting station (Callsign: 4DO) operated by local theatre manager Harold Learmonth Hobler. He transmitted basic programmes in late 1924 on a frequency of 1250 kHz. In August and September 1931, 4DO was again testing Sunday night transmissions on 1250 kHz & 1200 kHz, perhaps with a view to a Class B licence for his employer Tivoli Talkies.

The first permanent Rockhampton broadcast station was 4RK which commenced operation on 29 July 1931. The station was part of the National Broadcasting System, constructed owned and operated by the Postmaster-General's Department, but with programming provided by the Australian Broadcasting Company. On 1 July 1932 the Australian Broadcasting Commission took over provision of programming.4RK Rockhampton.

=== Commencement ===
The station was launched on 2 July 1932 and was the second station in Rockhampton – the first being 4RK, now ABC Capricornia. The opening of 4RO resulted in Rockhampton being the first regional city in Queensland, to have two radio stations on the air.

Coverage of races and football were among the first items to be featured on 4RO's earliest transmissions on 2 July 1932. The station was officially opened that night by Rockhampton Mayor, Thomas Joseph Lee.

In 1953, new transmitters of two kilowatts were built at Pink Lily, on the outskirts of Rockhampton.

The 4RO studio at 110 Victoria Parade was officially opened by Rockhampton Mayor Rex Pilbeam on 18 August 1970. In 1982, 4RO opened a new transmission site at Port Alma, south of Rockhampton, that started transmitting a power of five kilowatts. The old transmitter at Pink Lily is now used by 4RO's Gladstone based sister station 4CC to broadcast their Rockhampton service on 1584 AM. In 1979, 4RO employed a staff of 24 employees.

In 1996, 4RO was bought by RG Capital.

After successfully bidding for an FM licence, RG Capital launched an FM radio station in Rockhampton called Sea FM, which was added to RG Capital's existing network of Sea FM stations across Queensland and New South Wales. The new Sea FM studios were set up inside the 4RO building in Victoria Parade. The original intention for the creation of Sea FM was to use it as a sister-station to 4RO enabling the two stations to cater for two different age demographics with 4RO's programming slightly changed for an older audience, while Sea FM offered a more youth orientated format to attract younger listeners.

At the same time 4RO's new sister station was launched, RG Capital rival DMG Regional Radio also launched a local Hot FM into Central Queensland.

Hot FM Central Queensland was also a youth-orientated station, designed to attract the younger listeners that didn't listen to DMG's AM station in Gladstone, 4CC. Unlike 4CC which had its studio in Gladstone, DMG initially established a local Hot FM studio in Rockhampton to broadcast a local breakfast show and to emphasise the rivalry between the two new FM stations who were both fighting to attract a similar demographic.

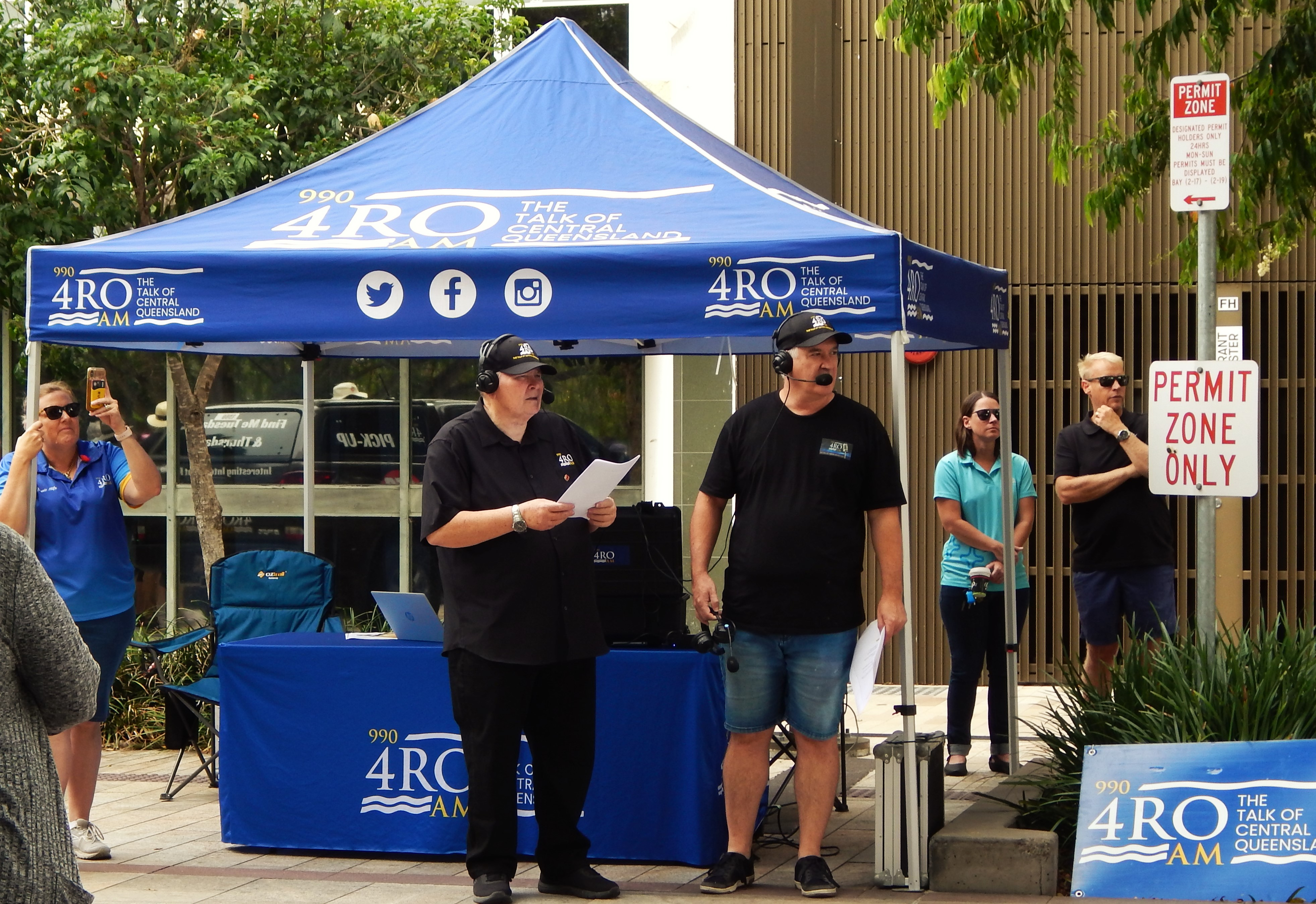
4RO covering the Rockhampton's Anzac Day in April 2022

However, a merger occurred in 2004 which saw RG Capital Radio and DMG Regional Radio acquired by Macquarie Regional RadioWorks, which meant all four local commercial stations were owned by the same company with two of the stations needing to be sold off. Macquarie Regional Radioworks offloaded the two AM stations to Prime Media Group with Prime also acquiring four other regional stations in Cairns, Townsville, and Mackay.

Despite now under different ownership, 4RO shared the Victoria Parade studios with Sea FM until August 2007, when 4RO moved into the riverside building at 220 Quay Street which had been vacated by Hot FM in late 2004, when they relocated their local studio to Gladstone.

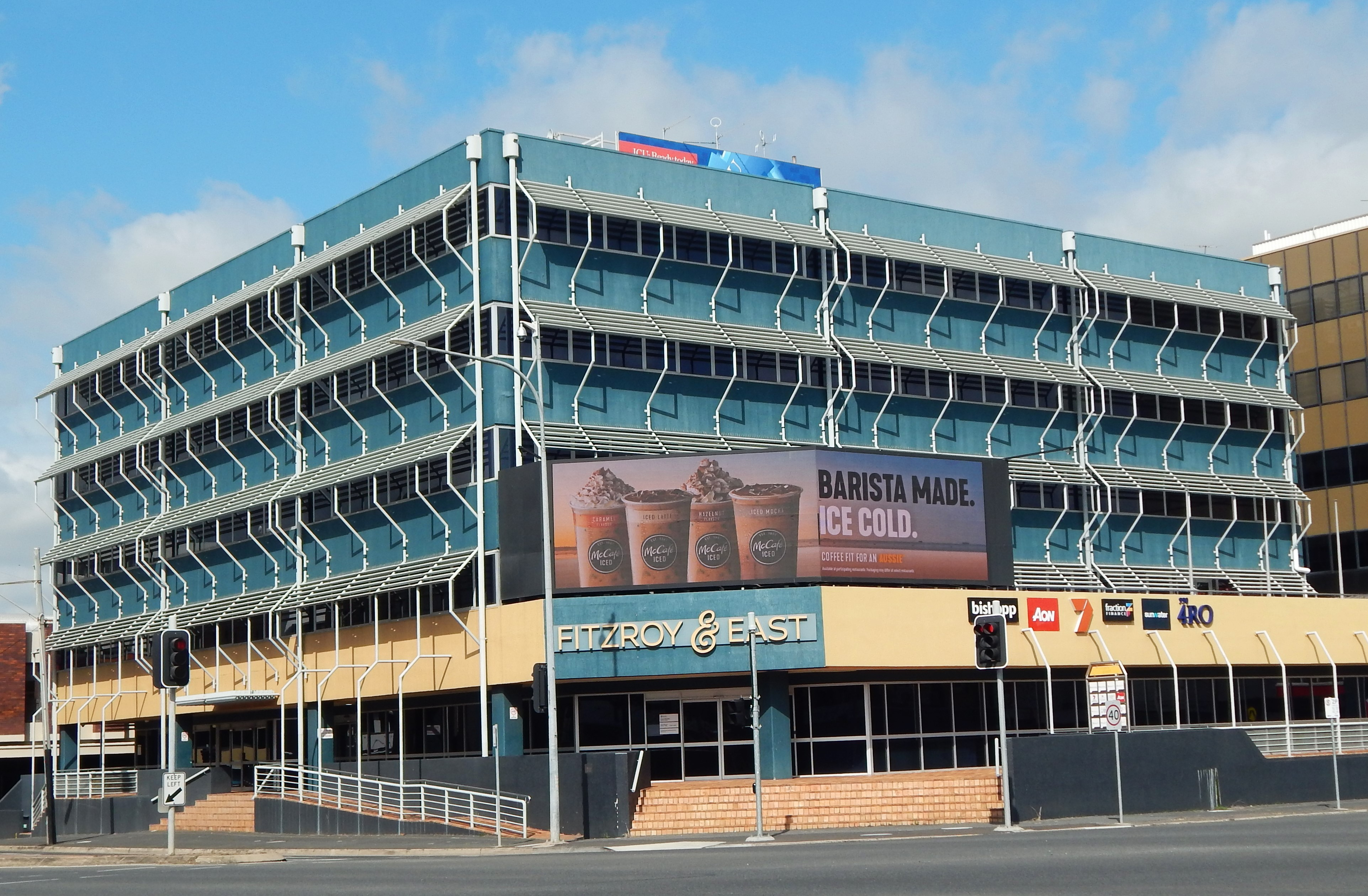
The building at 36 East Street in Rockhampton City where 4RO's current studios were officially opened on 2 February 2024

=== Studios ===
4RO's first studio was built on the corner of East and Denham Streets in the Rockhampton CBD. The studio was on the second floor of the building. An aerial that strung between two masts on the back of the building was responsible for transmitting a power of 200 watts.

In 1955 4RO moved into new studios in East Street, in a building that became known as Rheuben House. Rheuben House was the home to 4RO until 1970 when a new building designed by architects from Toowoomba were constructed on the corner of Archer Street and Victoria Parade.

4RO's studios at 220 Quay Street, incorporating a sales office for 4CC, were officially opened by Rockhampton Mayor Margaret Strelow on 14 November 2007.

In February 2024, 4RO vacated its premises at 220 Quay Street and relocated to the first level of the multi-storey building on the corner of Fitzroy and East Street in Rockhampton City. The new studios at 36 East Street were officially opened by Australian musician Daryl Braithwaite on 2 February 2024.

=== Ownership & Control ===
In August 2013 Grant Broadcasters acquired the station and Prime Media's other nine radio stations in Queensland. As a result, the 4RO studio in Rockhampton now serves as a sales office for Grant's KIX Country narrowcasting service.

4RO along with other stations owned by Grant Broadcasters were acquired by the Australian Radio Network in November 2021. This deal will allow Grant's stations, including 4RO, to access ARN's iHeartRadio platform in regional areas. The deal was finalized on 4 January 2022.

== Current Programming ==
=== Format ===
4RO's current slogan is The Talk of Central Queensland. As it suggests, the station currently has a varied format with an emphasis on talk. The station's programming is skewed towards an older audience, especially the 45+ demographics.

=== Shows ===
4RO currently broadcasts a mixture of local and nationally syndicated programs. Breakfast with Aaron Stevens is a local breakfast program which airs from 5:30am each weekday. Mornings with Gary Hardgrave 9am-12 from Brisbane's 4BC. Michael McLaren early afternoon show 12-3pm from Brisbane's 4BC. Drive from 3pm with Luke Cross. Nights with John Stanley 8-Midnight from Sydney's 2GB.

=== News ===
Sunshine Coast-based journalists compile and present national and local news bulletins that air on 4RO during each weekday. The station also uses the Nine News service during network programs from 4BC and 2GB.

Prior to 1998, 4RO had its own local newsroom in Rockhampton staffed with its own journalist. The journalist compiled full local news bulletins that went to air half-hourly from 6:30am to 8:30am, and then hourly from 9am until 1pm before a pre-recorded bulletin aired at 5pm. In 1998, the newsroom at 4RO was closed when RG Capital transferred 4RO's sole journalist to the newly established newsroom at Gold FM on the Gold Coast, where the journalist continued to read local bulletins for 4RO but also began presenting national news bulletins for all of RG Capital's network stations.

== Controversies ==
=== Mock Stolen Generations Apology ===
During a time when the then Australian Prime Minister John Howard was being called on to formally apologise to the Stolen Generations, a 4RO listener anonymously sent a letter to the station which took the form of a mock, sarcastic apology entitled Australian Apology to the Aborigines.

On 7 April 2000, 4RO breakfast co-presenter Olivia Scott read the "apology" on air.

A complaint was then lodged with the station. The unresolved complaint was then lodged with commercial radio's regulatory body, the Australian Broadcasting Authority on 6 May 2000 prompting an investigation. At the completion of the investigation, the ABA found 4RO had breached clause 1.3(c) of the Commercial Radio Codes of Practice by broadcasting material which was likely to vilify on the basis of race.

During the investigation, Olivia Scott was immediately suspended from all on-air duties but was re-instated on 8 May 2000 following the completion of the investigation on the condition that she personally apologise; the Human Rights & Equal Opportunity Commission was contacted by 4RO; an ongoing training program was implemented for all on air staff at 4RO; and at 4RO's instigation, a meeting was held on 2 May 2000 between representatives of Central Queensland's Indigenous community to discuss the issue. Following the investigation, managing director of RG Capital Radio, Rhys Holleran also pre-recorded an apology which was aired at various intervals on 13 April 2000 and 14 April 2000.

After satisfying the ABA with the various proactive steps taken by the station following the incident, no action was taken was taken against 4RO despite the breach.

Scott's 4RO breakfast co-presenter James Ashby later said that watching Scott endure substantial media and public scrutiny during the investigation without being able to help was the lowest point of his radio career.

=== Morning Announcer Dispute ===
Former WIN Television newsreader Bruce Diamond was employed by 4RO in 2004 to host a new 10am-midday program called CQ Today. 4RO decided to employ Diamond as he was a well-known media identity in Central Queensland having read the local news from Rockhampton's RTQ studio for more than twenty years before finishing in late 2002.

In August 2005, Diamond received a letter from 4RO management requesting him to stop talking about the local state member of parliament, Member for Rockhampton Robert Schwarten; Diamond's campaign calling for Rockhampton to receive an oncology unit at Rockhampton Hospital to limit long-distance travel for cancer patients; and 4RO's breakfast announcer Jeff Goodwin who Diamond claimed accepted a gift from Robert Schwarten (a cap) which Diamond described as unethical.

Diamond said he refused to be "gagged" and continued talking about the issues despite the request by management.

Schwarten said he had approached 4RO management for a "fair go" because Diamond had been criticising him on air for seven months, and claimed Diamond had gone too far when he involved Schwarten's wife and son. Diamond refuted the claim and invited Schwarten to submit any evidence to show how he had involved his family.

In late January 2006, 4RO axed CQ Today and shortened the breakfast program by an hour when the station decided to take the nationally syndicated John Laws Morning Show from 2UE in Sydney between 9am and midday each day. Diamond said he had "heated discussions" with 4RO management when he was fired at the conclusion of his last program on 27 January 2006. Diamond also claimed he was considering legal action, claiming 4RO had told him that they wanted him to host a new afternoon drive program on 4RO. Diamond also said 4RO staff had threatened to call the police when he offered to drop by the radio station to pick up the mail that was addressed to him.

== Notable Past Announcers ==
Since 4RO's inception in 1932, hundreds of announcers have worked at 4RO.

Among the more notable are Pauline Hanson's One Nation political advisor, James Ashby; parenting and relations expert, Dr Justin Coulson; former Rockhampton Mayor, Jim McRae; multiple award-winning announcer Aaron Stevens, renowned racecaller, Wayne Wilson; and former WIN Television presenters, Bruce Diamond and Gary Foale. Tom Canfell, who in 2024 was a finalist at the Australian Commercial Radio Awards for best talk presenter. Chris Monahan who went on to be the youngest ever full-time day time metro radio announcer and winner of best newcomer of the year at the Radio awards

== Ratings ==
On 29 September 2016, ratings for the Central Queensland radio market were released. It was the first time since 2001 that ratings for the market had been calculated. According to the ratings, 4RO performed best in the 65+ demographic with 16.9% audience share. The most listened to timeslot on 4RO was the 7pm-midnight shift with 8.6% audience share.
