= Hit Central Queensland =

Pop music radio station in central Queensland, Australia

- Gladstone, Queensland; Australia

Programming
- Language: English
- Affiliations: Hit Network

Ownership
- Owner: Southern Cross Austereo

hit Central Queensland is a radio station in Central Queensland. Part of the Hit Network, it is owned by Southern Cross Austereo.

== History ==
In the late 1990s, DMG Regional Radio successfully bid for an FM broadcasting license for a radio station in the Rockhampton/Gladstone market in Central Queensland.

In October 2000, Hot FM was launched. The station was a new addition to the existing Hot FM network of stations, also owned by DMG Regional Radio. The Central Queensland Hot FM station was originally created to attract the younger demographics that didn't listen to DMG's established classic hits station, Gladstone's 4CC which also broadcast to Rockhampton.

The station originally broadcast its local breakfast program from a studio in Rockhampton, and sourced its daytime and overnight programming from Hot FM Townsville. Since its inception, Hot FM has broadcast on two separate frequencies in Rockhampton and Gladstone.

When Hot FM was launched, RG Capital also launched an FM station in Rockhampton, Sea FM to attract a younger demographics that didn't find RG Capital's established AM station 4RO appealing. For the first few years, Sea FM and Hot FM were fierce rivals, battling for the same demographic of listeners.

In 2004, DMG Regional Radio merged with RG Capital to form Macquarie Regional RadioWorks, which saw all four local Central Queensland stations owned by the same company. Macquarie Regional Radioworks were legally obligated to offload at least two stations, and decided to sell their two AM stations, 4RO and 4CC to Prime Media Group.

This meant the two FM stations that were once rivals found themselves as sister stations.

In 2005, Hot FM decided to cease broadcasting content from Rockhampton. While the local Hot FM sales office was moved into the existing 4RO and Sea FM studio complex, the local breakfast program began being broadcast from the existing 4CC building in Gladstone. When this occurred, the breakfast announcer that had been with Hot FM since its inception moved over to Hot FM's new stablemate, Sea FM so he continue working in Rockhampton in 2005, while his Hot FM co-host moved to the afternoon shift on Sea FM. Hot FM began broadcasting its local breakfast show from the Gladstone studio on 24 January 2005.

Although no longer stablemates, 4CC and Hot FM have continued to share the same building in Gladstone since the merger.

== Current Programming ==
=== Format ===
Hot FM's format hasn't changed much since it was originally launched in 2000. The format has always been skewed towards the younger demographics, which is attracted by such things as the latest hits, celebrity gossip, pop culture and discussions about the latest television shows and movie releases.

=== News ===
Local news bulletins heard during the Hot FM breakfast program are compiled and presented by a Rockhampton-based journalist at Hot FM's sister station, Sea FM. National bulletins are presented from newsrooms either in Townsville or the Gold Coast.

== Ratings ==
On 29 September 2016, ratings for the Central Queensland radio market were released. It was the first time since 2001 that ratings for the Rockhampton/Gladstone market have been calculated.

According to the ratings, Hot FM performed best in the 10–17 and 18–24 demographics, with 53.2% and 52.5% audience share respectively. The most listened to timeslot was the 4pm to 7pm afternoon drive shift with 33.7% audience share. The station's midday-4pm shift also beat all the stations in that timeslot. The station also beat all other local stations in the 10+, 10–17, 18–24, and 25–39 age demographics. Hot FM's breakfast program was the highest rating breakfast show out of all commercial and ABC stations.

== Rebranding ==
On 26 September 2016, Southern Cross Austereo announced that Hot FM in Central Queensland would be renamed Hit as part of a major rebranding of the radio network. As part of the rebranding, Hot FM stations in Queensland and Western Australia, Star FM stations in New South Wales and some Sea FM stations were renamed, to reflect the look and feel of the metropolitan Hit Network. As the Sea FM station in Central Queensland is a Triple M station, it was renamed Triple M as part of the network's rebranding of regional stations.

== Past Breakfast Announcers ==
There have been fourteen duos that have presented Hot FM's/Hit CQ's breakfast show since its inception in October 2000 to its rebranding to Hit in December 2016. They have included former Big Brother Australia contestants, Rebecca Dent and Ben Norris.

- Daniel Smith and Tracey
- Daniel Smith and Joh Switzer
- Steve Lanzon and Katrina Tibbetts
- Damien Willoughby and Jess Doupe
- Rebecca Dent and Marty Braley
- Blair Woodcock and Simone ?
- Karina Brindley and Brian Rowe
- Karina Brindley and Kristian McKenna
- Ashlyn Montgomery and Zach Carapetis
- Paul 'Browny' Brown and Emilie-Jain Palmer
- Emilie-Jain Palmer and Ben Norris
- Ben Norris and Carly Portch
- Carly Portch and Daniel Lakey
- Tim Bolch and Jessica Pantou (

Brontë and Lakey currently broadcasting from sea fm studios in Broadbeach
