= 4CC =

4CC is a three-letter acronym that may refer to:

- Four Continents Figure Skating Championships
- FourCC - a sequence of four bytes used to uniquely identify data formats, especially video formats
- 4CC (AM) - a radio station in Gladstone and Rockhampton, Queensland, Australia
- NER Class 4CC, a class of 2 British 4-cylinder compound locomotives
