= Star 101.9 =

Star 101.9 (4MMK)

Mackay, Queensland; Australia
- Frequency: 101.9 MHz
- Branding: Star 101.9

Programming
- Format: Hot adult contemporary

Ownership
- Owner: ARN; (Radio Mackay Pty Ltd)
- Sister stations: 4MK

History
- First air date: 1999
- Call sign meaning: Station was originally branded as 4MK-FM

Technical information
- Licensing authority: ACMA
- ERP: 90 kW
- Transmitter coordinates: 21.14309°S 149.186847°E
- Repeaters: 89.3 MHz Byerwen Mine (75 watts); 90.7 MHz Airlie Beach (250 watts); 91.7 MHz Glenden (250 watts); 92.3 MHz Nebo (250 watts); 103.3 MHz Wollombi Mine (50 watts)

Links
- Public licence information: Profile
- Website: star1019.com.au

Star 101.9 (call sign 4MMK) is a commercial radio station in Mackay, Queensland, Australia. Owned and operated by ARN, the station was previously owned by Prime Media Group, until Prime's radio assets were sold to Grant Broadcasters in 2013, and then were later acquired by ARN in 2022.

== History ==
Star 101.9 FM was launched in 1999 as 4MK-FM, with an adult contemporary format. The new FM station took on the 4MK brand that had originally been associated with the AM station on 1026 AM.

When 4MK-FM was launched, the station on 1026 AM changed its name from 4MK to Easymix 1026 and was re-launched with an easy listening.

In 2005, 4MK-FM and Easymix were purchased from owners Macquarie Regional RadioWorks by Prime Media Group.

In late 2008, Prime Media Group launched the classic rock-formatted Zinc in Cairns, Gladstone and Townsville.

In March 2009, Prime Media Group announced that the Zinc brand would launch in Mackay as Zinc 101.9 with the 4MK brand moving back to its original place at 1026 AM, replacing Easymix 1026. Zinc 101.9's local programming consists of a local weekday breakfast show and a Saturday morning show, with all other programmes broadcast from Zinc 96 on the Sunshine Coast.

In 2012, Zinc 101.9 relocated from premises at 85 Sydney Street to its current home of 37 Sydney Street. In 2013, the station was sold, along with sister 4MK and Prime Media Group's other radio stations, to Grant Broadcasters.

In May 2016, Zinc 101.9 was re-branded again to Star 101.9.

In November 2021, Star 101.9, along with other stations owned by Grant Broadcasters, were acquired by the Australian Radio Network. This deal will allow Grant's stations, including Star 101.9, to access ARN's iHeartRadio platform in regional areas. The deal was finalized on 4 January 2022. It is expected Star 101.9 will integrate with ARN's KIIS Network, but will retain its current name according to the press release from ARN.
