= 837 AM =

AM radio frequency

The following radio stations broadcast on AM frequency 837 kHz:

== Australia ==
- ABC Capricornia in Rockhampton

== United Kingdom ==
- BBC Radio Cumbria in Barrow-in-Furness
