= Kool FM (disambiguation) =

Kool FM or Kool Radio, may refer to:

== Asia-Oceania ==
=== Australia ===
- Kool FM (Innisfail), contemporary hits radio in Queensland, Australia

=== Malaysia ===
- Kool FM (Malaysia), a talk and adult contemporary station in Malaysia previously known as Buletin FM and Kool 101

=== South Korea ===
- KBS Cool FM, a South Korean radio station

== Europe ==
- Kool FM, also known as Kool London, a drum and bass radio station in London, England

== North America ==
=== Canada ===
- CKMB-FM, known as 107.5 Kool FM, a hot adult contemporary format radio station in Barrie, Ontario
- CJEG-FM, known as Kool FM 101.3, a hot adult contemporary format radio station in Alberta, Canada

=== United States ===
- KOOL-FM, a classic hits radio station based in Phoenix, Arizona, United States
- KNGS-LP, known as Kool FM 104.5 based in Hanford, California, United States
- WSKP (AM), known as Kool Radio based in Rhode Island, United States
- WRTH-LP, along with its translator W299BO in Greenville, South Carolina, United States
