= 4MK =

Coordinates: 21.1410°S 149.1874°E

- Mackay, Queensland, Australia; Australia
- Broadcast area: Mackay
- Frequency: 1026 kHz

Programming
- Format: Classic Hits

Ownership
- Owner: ARN; (Radio Mackay Pty Ltd)
- Sister stations: Star 101.9

History
- First air date: 1931
- Call sign meaning: MacKay

Links
- Website: 4mk.com.au

4MK is a commercial radio station based in Mackay, Queensland, Australia. The station is owned by ARN and broadcasts on 1026 AM.

== Programming ==
The station currently broadcasts some locally presented programming, such as the breakfast and morning programs, which are presented by Mackay-based announcers.

However, the station also sources some programming produced from elsewhere in the Grant Broadcasters network. This includes the 4MK afternoon show which sounds as though it is presented locally, but actually consists of pre-recorded segments compiled in Gladstone by the 4CC breakfast announcer

== History ==
It was first announced in 1930 that Mackay would likely be home to a new low-powered radio station with 4MK as its call-sign. . The station went to air for the first time in 1931, commencing operation from the front room of a private residence belonging to the station owner's father.

In March 1988 4MK was sold by Qintex to Wesgo. In October 1990 it was sold to Michael Willesee.

In 1999, the 4MK branding was moved to Mackay's new FM station 4MK-FM which commenced broadcasting on 101.9 FM. The original AM station was renamed EasyMix 1026.

In March 2009 the FM station was re-branded from 4MK-FM to Zinc, which allowed the AM station to revert to its original 4MK callsign. In 2016, the FM station experienced another rebrand as its name was changed from Zinc to Star 101.9. Unlike in 2009, 4MK's name, format and frequency remained unchanged.

One of the station's longest serving employees was Trevor Lymbery who began working in the radio industry in 1959, commencing work as an announcer at 4MK in 1964. Lymbery was an announcer for four years before moving to other roles at 4MK including being a sales manager and account executive. He retired in September 2010.

In November 2021, 4MK, along with other stations owned by Grant Broadcasters, were acquired by the Australian Radio Network. This deal allowed Grant's stations, including 4MK, to access ARN's iHeartRadio platform in regional areas. The deal was completed on 4 January 2022. It was expected 4MK would integrate with ARN's Gold Network, but retain its current name according to the press release from ARN.
