= 91.1 Hot FM =

91.1 Hot FM (4MCY)
Maroochydore, Queensland; Australia
- Broadcast area: Nambour
- Frequency: 91.1 MHz

Programming
- Format: Contemporary hit radio

Ownership
- Owner: Australian Radio Network; (Hot 91 Pty Ltd)
- Sister stations: Zinc 96.1

History
- First air date: 27 October 2003
- Former names: Hot 91

Technical information
- Licensing authority: ACMA
- ERP: 10 kW
- Transmitter coordinates: 26°47′24″S 152°55′06″E
- Repeater: 97.9 MHz Noosa/Tewantin (200 watts ERP)

Links
- Public licence information: Profile
- Website: www.hot91.com.au

91.1 Hot FM (call sign 4MCY) is a radio station based in Maroochydore on Queensland's Sunshine Coast. It is owned by the Australian Radio Network and airs a contemporary hit radio format.

== History ==
The station began broadcasting on 27 October 2003 as the Sunshine Coast's third commercial radio station and the 64th to be owned by DMG Radio Australia. Hot 91, airing what was described as a rock-leaning hot adult contemporary format, brought competition to the pair of Mix and Sea FM, which were commonly owned. DMG Radio acquired a licence for a new station in Brisbane in 2004; it chose to sell Hot 91 instead of its 50 per cent interest in 97.3 FM Brisbane, transferring an 85 per cent stake in the station to Rob Gamble–owned Queensland Media Investments in November 2004. Gamble started a second local station, the older-skewing Zinc 96, in 2006. Both stations were acquired by Prime Media Group in 2007 and moved studios to Maroochydore.

When Prime Media Group named Lachlan Murdoch to its board in 2010, its ownership of Hot 91 caused it to run afoul of radio ownership rules. At the time, Murdoch was a director and controller of companies that controlled two stations in Brisbane. The Brisbane and Nambour radio licence areas overlap because more than 30 per cent of the latter is shared with the former. As a result, Murdoch and Siobhan McKenna resigned from Prime's board.

Prime Media Group sold its radio stations to Grant Broadcasters in 2013. In 2020, Grant launched a new, all-local lineup for Hot 91 covering mornings, afternoons and evenings. Grant sold its radio properties in January 2022 to Here, There & Everywhere, parent of the Australian Radio Network.

As of 2023, the station was the third most-listened to on the Sunshine Coast, per an Xtra Insights ratings survey.
