= 4US =

Australian community radio station

Coordinates: 23°18′58″S 150°30′45″E

4US is an Australian community radio station located in Rockhampton, Queensland.

The station is managed by the Central Queensland Aboriginal Corporation for Media and broadcasts programming specifically aimed at Central Queensland's Aboriginal community on 100.7 FM.

4US first went to air in 1998 with programs originating from an outside broadcast van that had been donated to the station by ABC Capricornia, before the station established a better equipped studio in the heritage-listed Rockhampton Harbour Board Building.

In 2005, the station moved to a new studio at the Dreamtime Cultural Centre in North Rockhampton, where it continues to broadcast.

In the past, 4US announcers have attended training sessions at Brisbane Indigenous radio station, 98.9 FM where 4US staff worked with experienced radio broadcasters including industry veteran Jamie Dunn.
