= James Ashby =

Australian political advisor (born 1979)

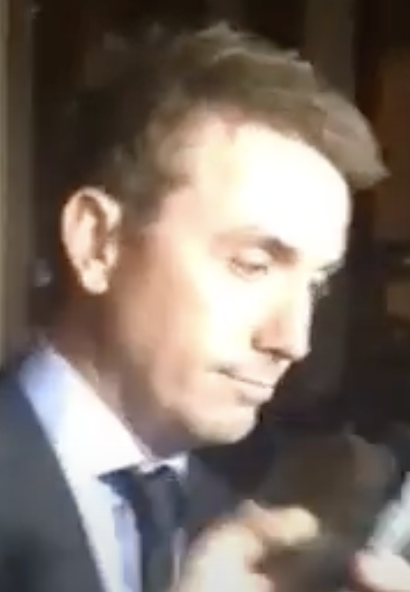
- Ashby in October 2012

Party director of One Nation
- Incumbent
- Assumed office 3 August 2026

Chief of Staff for Pauline Hanson
- In office 2016 – 3 August 2026
- Preceded by: Position established
- Succeeded by: Chris Taylor

Leader of One Nation Queensland
- Incumbent
- Assumed office 20 September 2024
- Preceded by: Steve Dickson

Personal details
- Born: James Hunter Ashby; 1979 (age 46–47) Nambour, Queensland, Australia
- Party: One Nation (since c. 2015)
- Other political affiliations: Liberal National (2011–2014)
- Occupation: Journalist; Businessman

James Hunter Ashby (born 1979) is an Australian political advisor and former radio presenter who has served as the party director for One Nation since August 2026. He was chief of staff to One Nation leader Pauline Hanson from 2016 to August 2026.

Formerly a Liberal National member, Ashby first rose to prominence in 2012 when he triggered a political scandal by making allegations of sexual harassment against the Speaker of the Australian House of Representatives, Peter Slipper whom he worked for at the time as a media advisor.

== Radio career ==
While he was in Rockhampton, RG Capital, the owners of 4RO were issued with a new FM licence enabling the company to establish a Sea FM station for the area to provide listeners with an FM alternative to 4RO. Ashby was tasked with helping set up the station, and became the new station's first announcer in October 2000, co-hosting the breakfast show with Joanne Spargo. He remained with Sea FM in Rockhampton until October 2001 when he was dismissed by station management. Reasons for his departure remain unclear but local media reported at the time that Ashby was considering taking legal action against the station following his dismissal. Ashby has since admitted he left Sea FM on bad terms, and was told that he would never work in radio again.

After leaving Rockhampton, he worked at Triple M in Brisbane for six months before moving to Newcastle where he was a drive announcer on NXFM. In October 2002, Ashby resigned from NXFM after he was charged with verbally harassing another radio presenter at rival station, NEW FM. It was alleged that Ashby made four offensive phone calls. Ashby said he received a $2060 fine and a three-year good behaviour bond as punishment.

He moved to North Queensland in January 2004, he continued his radio work, beginning work for DMG Regional Radio, doing various on air shifts at Townsville radio stations 4TO FM and Hot FM.

Before becoming media advisor for Peter Slipper, Ashby was employed as marketing manager for Gowinta Farms on the Sunshine Coast. In May 2011, Ashby appeared in media coverage, after an attempted poisoning of the crops on the farm, after poison was discovered in a water tank.

== Sexual harassment allegations against Peter Slipper (2012–2015) ==
Ashby rose to prominence when he made allegations that he was sexually harassed by federal MP Peter Slipper. In 2012, Ashby alleged that while working as Slipper's media advisor, he was the victim of sexual harassment which consisted of unwanted sexual advances, hundreds of suggestive text messages and a request to shower with the door open at a Canberra unit.

In December 2012, the Federal Court dismissed the allegations. However, in February 2014, Ashby won an appeal against the decision to dismiss the case. Then, in June 2014, Ashby decided to drop the lawsuit entirely less than two weeks before it was due to commence. At the time, Slipper said he viewed Ashby's decision to withdraw the opportunity to have the allegations tested in court as being vindication against any wrongdoing. Several months later, Ashby said in a television interview that he had been promised a job and legal funding by Slipper's former party colleague Christopher Pyne, after telling him of the sexual harassment.

In 2015, the Australian Federal Police (AFP) raided the home of Ashby, and the home of Ashby's parents, during an investigation into allegations that former federal MP Mal Brough illegally obtained copies of diaries belonging to Peter Slipper, ahead of Ashby's sexual harassment case. The search warrants also related to any material associating federal MPs Christopher Pyne and Wyatt Roy, who were both suspected of offering Ashby inducements to complain about Slipper. Following the raids, Ashby agreed to be formally interviewed by police about the allegations of copying diaries belonging to Slipper. After the scandal, Ashby moved to Yeppoon, where he worked as a signwriter and pilot.

When details of Ashby's sexual harassment allegations first became known in 2012, ABC Television's current affairs program 7.30 aired allegations that Ashby had been involved in a relationship with a fifteen-year-old boy in Townsville, Queensland. The program reported that the boy, prompted by media coverage of Ashby's allegations, sent an email to Peter Slipper detailing the relationship he had with Ashby. It also aired contents of a Facebook message that Ashby allegedly sent back to the boy previously, just prior to commencing his role as media advisor. The program also reported that Peter Slipper had encouraged the boy to go to the police, but a few weeks later, Slipper himself wrote to Queensland Police Commissioner Bob Atkinson about the allegations, and forwarded on the email and the Facebook message. In a statement, the Queensland Police Service said they were in the process of determining whether any person was wanting to make an official complaint and whether there was enough evidence for prosecution.

When his claims drew criticism from politicians, Ashby lodged a complaint with the Australian Human Rights Commission. His lawyers complained in May 2012 that senator and foreign minister Bob Carr had tweeted that their client "seems more rehearsed than a kabuki actor", and that senator Barnaby Joyce told media he was "only slightly less dodgy than Slipper".

== 2012 police investigation into child sex allegations ==
In July 2012, ABC's 7.30 reported that Queensland Police were investigating allegations that James Ashby had sexual relationships with two 15-year-old boys in Townsville in 2003. The report stated that the allegations arose after a Queensland man contacted Peter Slipper following Ashby's sexual harassment case against Slipper.

The man alleged that he had a sexual relationship with Ashby in Townsville when he was 15 and Ashby was in his mid-twenties. ABC reported that the man's email to Slipper also alleged that Ashby ended that relationship to begin a relationship with another 15-year-old. The article quoted the man as saying, "I was 15 at the time, however what we did, under Queensland law, cannot be consented to under the age of 18."

ABC's 7.30 also reported that it had seen Facebook messages which it said Ashby sent to the man, and which the program described as confirming their relationship. ABC's AM program separately reported that 7.30 had sighted Facebook messages between the man and Ashby "talking about their relationship".

After receiving the material, Slipper urged the man to take the matter to police and later wrote to Queensland Police Commissioner Bob Atkinson on 26 June 2012, forwarding emails and Facebook messages. In his letter, Slipper wrote: "Although the allegations that have come to light predate Mr Ashby's employment with my office, they raise issues of possible criminal conduct. In these circumstances, I cannot ignore the allegations."

Queensland Police told ABC's 7.30 that the service was determining whether any person authorised to do so wished to make a complaint and, if so, whether there was evidence to support a prosecution. ABC reported at the time that it was not clear whether Ashby would have a case to answer. A spokesman for Ashby told ABC's AM program that Ashby had no comment on the allegations at that stage.

== One Nation (2015–present) ==
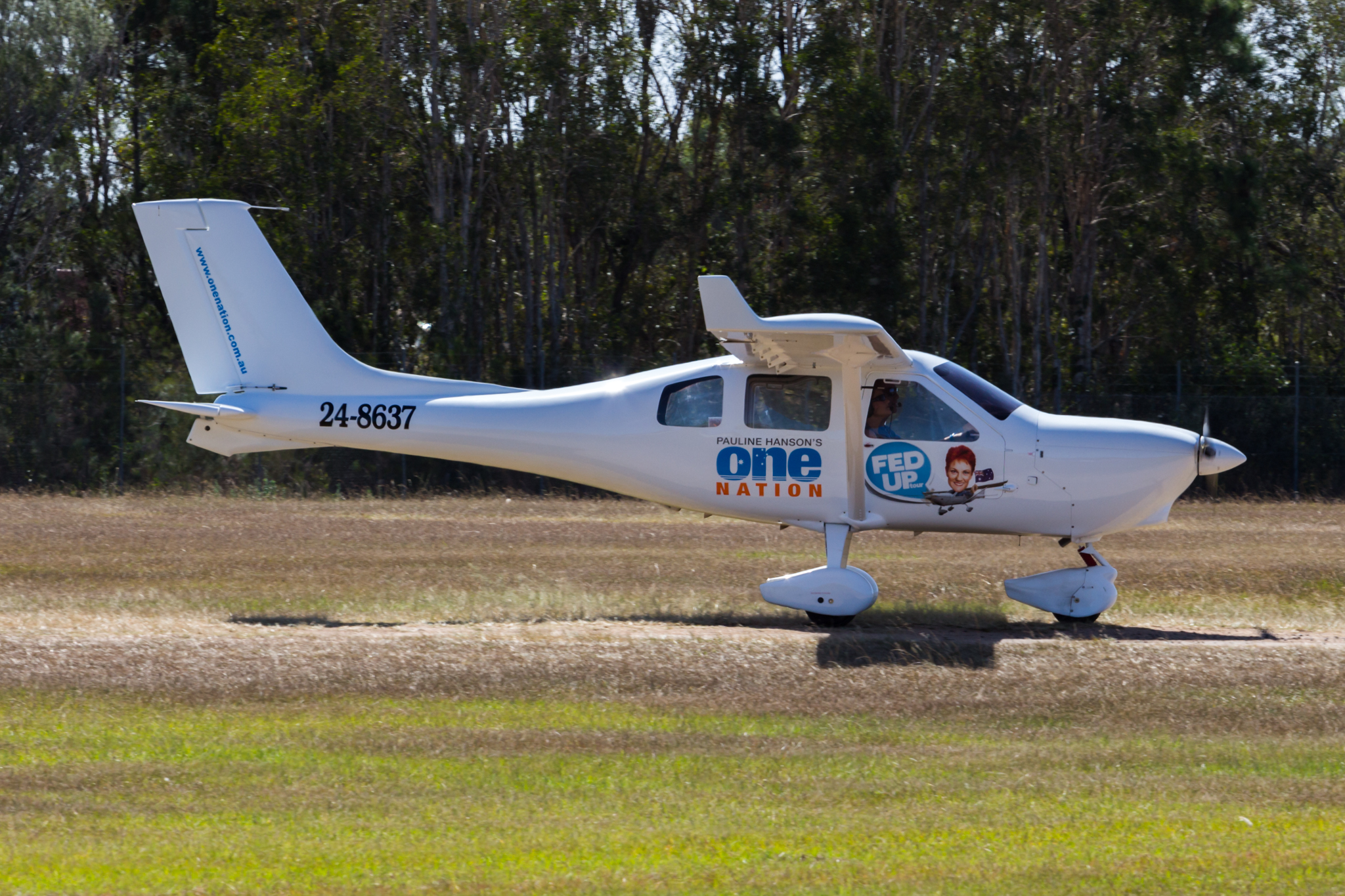
Pauline Hanson in a Jabiru J230 at Caboolture Airfield for the Caboolture Air Show. The aircraft has "Fed Up" slogan decals on the side (April 2016)

In 2015, Ashby became involved in Pauline Hanson's One Nation political party as media advisor. As Ashby holds a pilot's licence, he also spends time flying Hanson to and from political events and commitments around the country.

In November 2016, the chief of staff for senator Rod Culleton said that Ashby threw a phone at her after an argument. Hanson said it was an underarm throw and that the incident had been blown out of proportion. (In a similar incident years before, Ashby was alleged to have thrown a newspaper reporter's phone.) Also in November, Ashby told journalists not to ask off-topic questions at a press conference held by senator Malcolm Roberts. Former One Nation treasurer, Ian Nelson, has accused Ashby of directing One Nation candidates to use Ashby's printing business for getting campaign materials printed, saying that candidates feared becoming disendorsed if they did not use Ashby's press and that Ashby's rates were "more than the going rate". Following Shan Ju Lin's disendorsement from One Nation, Lin accused Ashby of deciding on Hanson's behalf that Lin should be disendorsed. Hanson has requested that Ashby sit in for her at National Broadband Network (NBN) committee meetings in April and on other occasions if need be.

In May 2017, an audio recording of Ashby suggesting that One Nation over-inflate prices on campaign material sold to their candidates for financial profit in upcoming state elections was leaked. In response, Prime Minister Malcolm Turnbull sought advice from the justice minister, Michael Keenan, and the Australian Federal Police while the Labor Party called for a police probe into the matter. Ashby and Hanson denied that the idea had ever been implemented.

In November 2017, Ashby called then One Nation member Stephen Lane, who was an independent candidate for the seat of Thuringowa, and threatened to cancel Lane's membership if he did not take down a video on his Facebook page explaining to the public that he was a One Nation member but had decided to run for the seat of Thuringowa as an independent because of the lack of transparency in the party. Lane later received a letter cancelling his membership.

In February 2019, Ashby was involved in a physical altercation with senator Brian Burston, who had made a sexual harassment claim against Pauline Hanson. The President of the Senate, Scott Ryan, stripped Ashby of his parliamentary pass after the incident, which prohibited Ashby from entering the building until the ban was revoked.

=== One Nation–National Rifle Association scandal (2019) ===
In March 2019, it was revealed that Ashby had been secretly captured on video with Steve Dickson courting the National Rifle Association of America (NRA) seeking funds for Pauline Hanson's One Nation, with the promise to weaken Australia's gun laws if they gained the balance of power in the Australian parliament. Al Jazeera conducted a three-year long operation to uncover this activity, by having a person called Rodger Muller pose as the head of a fake gun lobby group, Gun Rights Australia, then having Muller record meetings he attended with Ashby and Queensland state leader of Pauline Hanson's One Nation, Steve Dickson, where strategies to seek support from the National Rifle Association and at least one of their large corporate benefactor were discussed. The footage from these meetings were used to produce an episode for Al Jazeera English, titled How to Sell a Massacre. As of 26 March 2019, Al Jazeera said that Part Two would be released shortly. Pauline Hanson and One Nation were criticised for seeking funding from overseas, due to the support the party had given to banning foreign donations to Australian political parties.

Speaking to "Rodger Muller", Dickson said that "If they threw ten million dollars at us, we could fucking win a heap of seats. Plus a shitload of seats in the senate. Mate, if you make this shit happen, I'll make sure we open any fucking door you need open." During the meetings with the NRA, Dickson said, "We get the balance of power, very simply that means that we have the testicles of the Government in our hand at every given stage." "If we can get a million dollars fucking U.S. towards social media. I don’t even need the money. I just need the grunt. If we get the grunt of that much social media supporting us, I don't need to touch the money… They [the NRA] are a third party punching this shit in, and we're giving them the stuff that they're punching in - there's the trick - it's experience. I've been a minister in the government. I'm really fortunate because I was on a committee within parliament called the Parliamentary Crime and Misconduct Committee. It's bad shit. I'm never going to jail because (Muller interjects, "You've figured it out") because I walk the knife."

During Ashby and Dickson's meeting with the NRA's Public Relations team, Lars Dalseide (NRA Media Liaison), suggests to Dickson tactics to use in the wake of any mass shootings in Australia. In reply to Dalseide's suggested line, "How dare you stand on the graves of those children and put forth your political agenda?" Dickson replies, "I love that." Dalseide: "If your policy isn't good enough to stand on its own, how dare you use their deaths to push that forward?" Ashby: "That's really good. That's really strong."

During the NRA meetings, Dickson expressed anti-Muslim sentiments: "We've been importing all these Muslims into Australia. We have about 230,000 people coming in a year. Our population's only 25 million - some really dangerous people. They're just breaking into people's homes with baseball bats and killing people. Basically stealing everything they own. Gangs. Our country is going into chaos." Ashby expressed his views of the Greens: "We've got a political party called the Greens. They are fucktards, honestly, they are the worst people. They are Democrats on steroids. Beyond your imagination."

Though both Ashby and Dickson declined Al Jazeera's invitation to comment on the footage, ABC News reported that "In a statement, Mr Ashby has accused Al Jazeera of being 'a state-owned propaganda arm of the Qatari Government that supports Islamic extremist groups and are not a legitimate media organisation. The matter has been referred to ASIO and the Australian Federal Police due to concerns of foreign interference into Australian politics in the lead-up to the imminent federal election. It is understood One Nation was targeted because of its strong approach to reducing immigration numbers and a travel ban on countries with terrorism links. One Nation strongly supports the rights of lawful gun ownership within Australia and have clearly outlined our policy on our website. One Nation members have always complied with the law.'"

A further public statement was made by Ashby and Dickson on 26 March 2019, in which the pair excused themselves on the grounds of being drunk at the time.

=== One Nation Queensland state leader (2024) ===
Ashby was appointed One Nation Queensland party leader in September ahead of the state election later that year.

He led the party in the 2024 Queensland state election, running in the seat of Keppel where he placed third and received a primary vote of 25.06 and 9.41% positive swing. The party as a whole received 8% of the statewide vote, a minor positive swing, however was not able to win back its single seat of Mirani after its incumbent MP was disendorsed and subsequently quit One Nation and unsuccessfully ran with Katter's Australian Party.

=== One Nation as a major party (2026–present) ===
In April 2026, Ashby, alongside Pauline Hanson, was accused by two former One Nation candidates of dismissing concerns raised about the re-hiring of convicted rapist Sean Black as campaign director following his release from prison.

At an event in Albury on 8 May for the 2026 Farrer by-election, Ashby ejected local Wodonga-based ABC reporters from a One Nation event. The decision was taken unilaterally by Ashby and was questioned by Hanson on the basis that they were local "regional and rural" reporters. He responded that they were "reporting back to ABC Canberra" and she stated that they "They shouldn't have gone". The ABC was later banned from all future campaign events and press conferences during the by-election. Later in the campaign, following an altercation between Senator James Paterson and a One Nation volunteer which Paterson labeled assault, Ashby claimed that Paterson had initiated the altercation by "rage baiting" the volunteer. The altercation was condemned by One Nation candidate David Farley at the time and initially apologised for by Hanson who later walked back her apology and vowed to stand by the volunteer after Ashby's comment.

On 3 August, Ashby became party director for One Nation with his former duties being taken up by former adviser to prime minister Scott Morrison, Chris Taylor.

== Personal life ==
Ashby is gay.
