= Keppel FM =

Coordinates: 23.1313°S 150.7416°E

Keppel FM (4NAG)
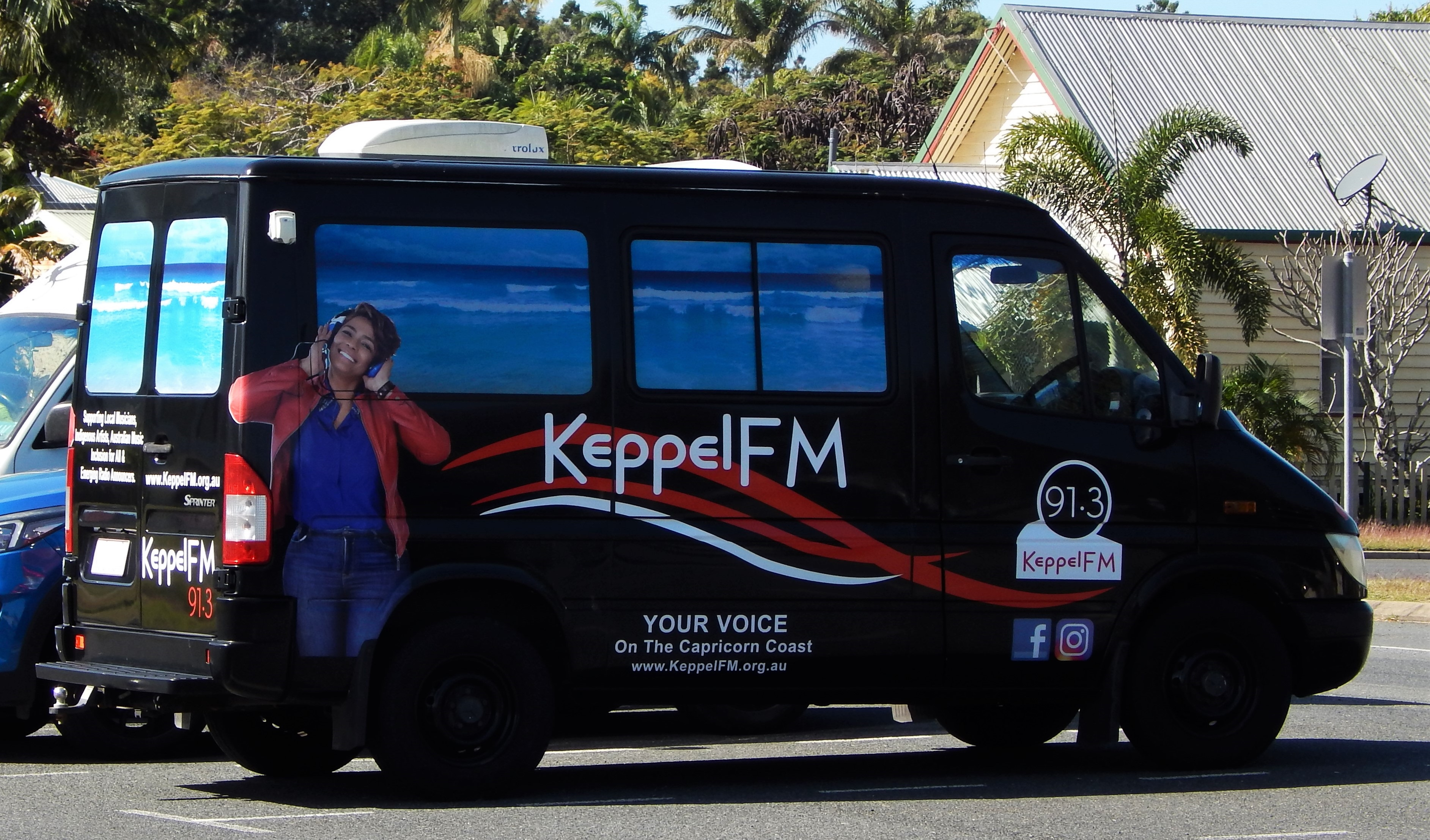
- Keppel FM van, 2022
- Yeppoon, Queensland; Australia
- Broadcast area: Capricorn Coast
- Frequency: 91.3 MHz
- Branding: YOUR VOICE on the Capricorn Coast

Programming
- Format: community

Ownership
- Owner: (NAG Radio Broadcasting Association Inc)

History
- Founded: 1998
- First air date: 20 August 1999
- Former names: Radio NAG; 4NAG
- Call sign meaning: Nick, Andre, Graham

Links
- Website: www.keppelfm.org.au

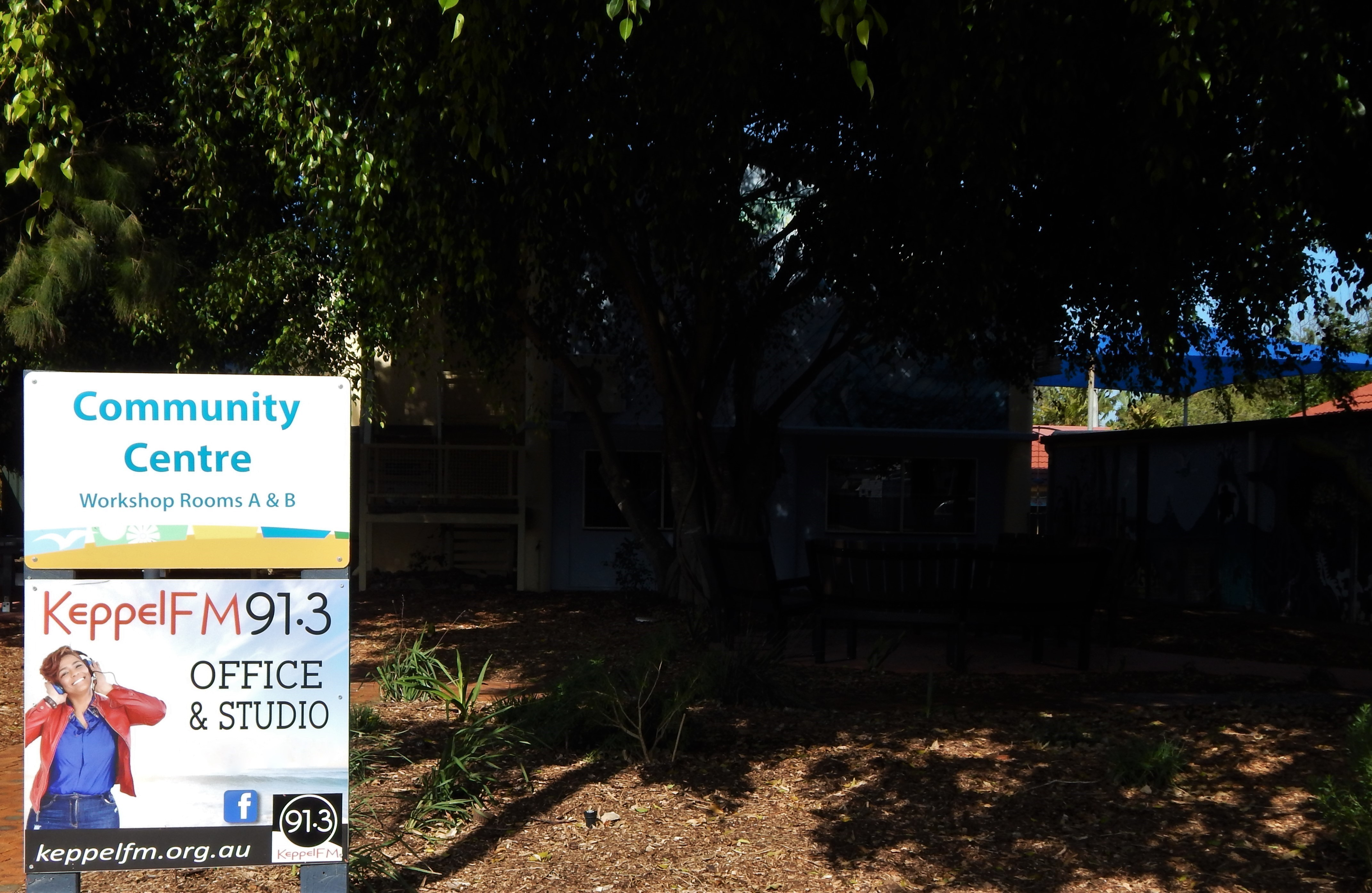
Keppel FM studio at the Yeppoon Community Centre, 2022

Keppel FM (stylised as KeppelFM; call sign: 4NAG) is an Australian community radio station located in Yeppoon, Queensland, Australia.

The station commenced transmission as Radio NAG on 20 August 1999 broadcasting from a room at Yeppoon State High School to communities along the Capricorn Coast on 91.3 FM. With the help of Livingstone Shire Council, the station soon after established their permanent studios at the Yeppoon Community Centre in John Street.

Programming broadcast by Keppel FM consists predominantly of live and pre-recorded local shows which are presented by a diverse team of volunteer announcers who vary in age and cultural backgrounds.

Originally broadcasting as "Radio NAG", the station relaunched in 2014 when it began branding itself with its official callsign, 4NAG.

The original NAG acronym was an homage to the station's founders, Nick Saunders, Andre Soarez and Graham Channells who first discussed the viability of establishing a community radio station in Yeppoon during a game of darts.

The station used its annual open day in 2014 as an opportunity to officially unveil its name and revamped programming line-up. Special guests included Livingstone Shire mayor Bill Ludwig and television personality Peter Byrne who cut a ceremonial ribbon with president of Capricorn Coast Community Radio, Cherie Furness.

During National Volunteers Week in 2016, it was revealed 4NAG would be one of thirty-six local Central Queensland community organisations to receive a share in $150,000 of Federal Government funding. It was announced the station would be receiving $5,000.

The station was nominated in the Excellence in Ethnic and Multicultural Engagement category at the 2016 CBAA Awards, but lost to Brisbane's 4EB.

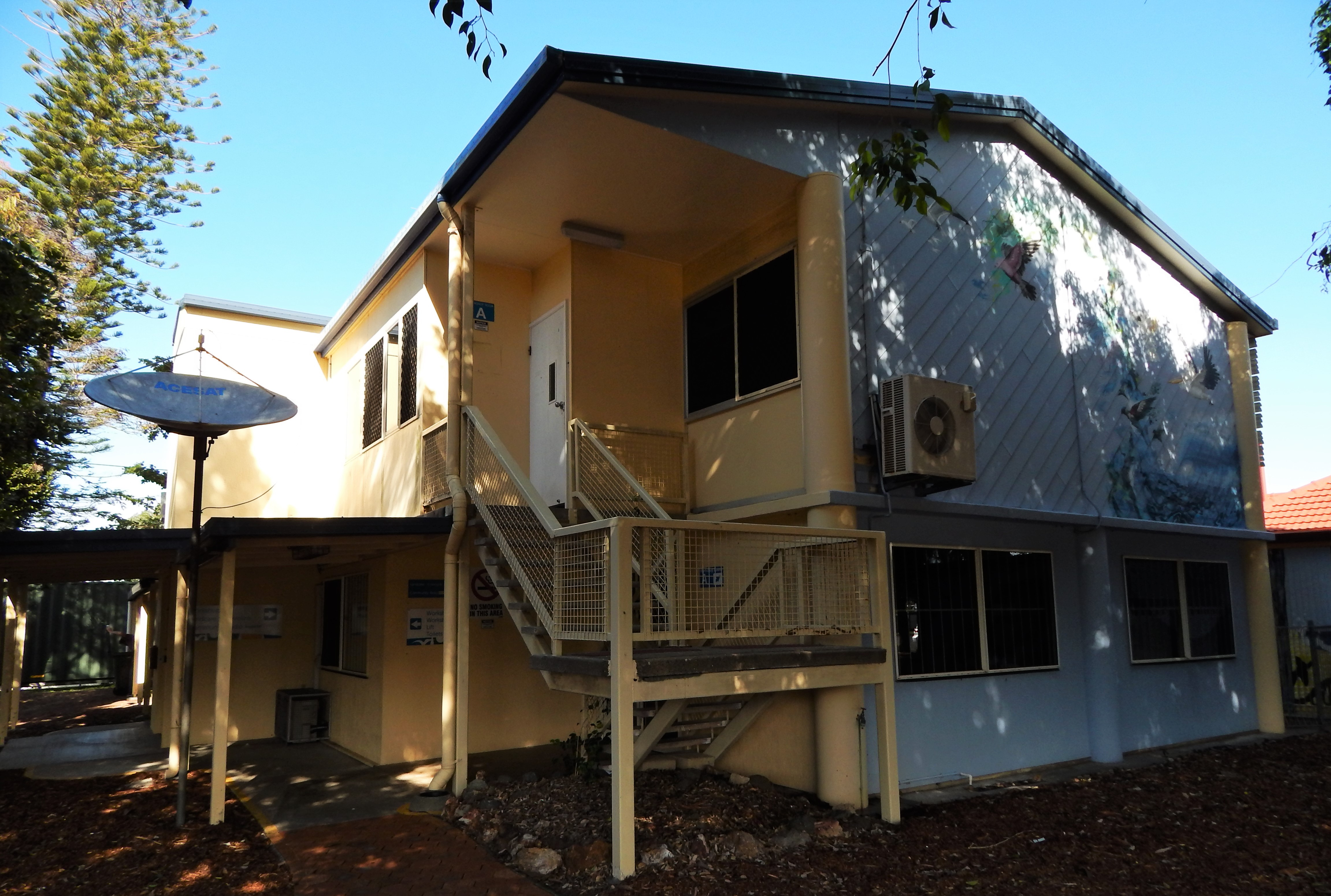
Keppel FM studio at Yeppoon Community Centre, 2022

The station underwent a further rebranding in 2019, renaming itself Keppel FM (stylised as KeppelFM).

A Keppel FM spokesperson said it was felt that the time had come to change the station's name to a more recognisable name which had a closer association with the Capricorn Coast, particularly with the station finding a wider audience with online streaming.

An open day was held on 26 October 2019 to celebrate the station's new identity.

In 2019, the station had 15 on air presenters.
