= Switch Brisbane =

Switch Brisbane (4BI)
- Brisbane, Queensland; Australia
- Broadcast area: South East Queensland
- Frequencies: AM: 1197 kHz; DAB+: 9B Brisbane

Programming
- Format: Community radio

Ownership
- Owner: (Brisbane Interactive Radio Group Inc)

History
- First air date: 7 April 2003
- Former call signs: 4YB
- Former frequencies: 97.3 MHz
- Call sign meaning: 4 for Queensland plus Brisbane Interactive

Technical information
- Licensing authority: ACMA
- Power: 500 W
- Transmitter coordinates: 27.515169°S 152.99766°E

Links
- Public licence information: Profile
- Webcast: Listen live
- Website: switchbrisbane.com.au

1197 AM Switch Brisbane (call sign 4BI) is a community broadcast radio station operated by Brisbane Interactive Radio Group Inc., which is a community-based not-for-profit youth organisation based in Brisbane, Queensland, Australia. The station also simulcasts its programming output on Digital Radio.

== History ==
Brisbane Interactive Radio Group Inc. (BIRGI) was founded in 1998 by Matthew Boyd, Tim Casey, Andrew Stephens, Steven Mcveigh, Jon Mustchin and Cass Myles, and was granted a series of temporary radio broadcasting licences, allowing shared transmissions with other aspirant broadcasters on 97.3 MHz between 1999 and 2001, then in 2001 the 97.3 frequency was auctioned to the Australian Radio Network, to become what was then known as 97.3, The New FM.

In 2002, the Australian Broadcasting Authority granted a high-powered FM community licence to Christian broadcaster 96five Family FM on 96.5 MHz, and a high-powered AM community licence to BIRGI on 1197 kHz. BIRGI commenced test transmissions in late 2002 and began full-time broadcasting at 8am on 7 April 2003, identifying as i-1197. From this period until January 2005, the station broadcast an uninhibited range of music genres and programming, with a slight focus on Top 40 music.

In January 2005, the station was re-branded to the programming format based upon its predecessor, Switch FM, focusing on playing a more Rhythmic format, along with adopting the brand name of Switch 1197. In April 2013, the station celebrated its 10th consecutive broadcasting year on the AM band, by airing daily compiles of material collected both on and off-air over that decade-long period.

In 2017, the station re-branded as Brisbane Youth Radio, with a new callsign of 4YB. In 2019, the station was re-branded once again from Brisbane Youth Radio to 1197 AM.

In 2020, Matthew Boyd, who was a founding member of BIRGI, took over the station, reverting many of the changes made by the former management, and changing the name back to Switch, this time as Switch Brisbane, deemphasizing the AM transmission.

== Audio streaming ==
In 2004, the station was the first radio station in Australia to stream with aacPlus technology and it continues to provide both near CD quality (64 kbit/s) and Mobile (32 kbit/s) compatible streams, as well as a 128k MP3 stream.

In 2007, the station was added to the Internode Broadband Radio Streams that are provided by Australian ISP Internode.

== Programming ==
The stations general weekday daytime programming contains a Rhythmic format, with various information segments mixed in, most with a specific focus on local events and community services for the Youth.

The stations night-time and weekend programming, as required by the licence, focuses on more specialist program material including specialist talk and information programming.

== Controversy ==
=== OUT Radio ===
==== Anti-Transgender Comments ====
In November of 2026, the owner of the station, Matthew Boyd, in a private off-radio chat conversation with Greg Gould, revealed that his Switch Brisbane show OUT Radio intentionally excludes transgender people. He went on to describe transgender people as "a fetish add on" that is "not common" in the queer community. He also argued that gays, lesbians, and bisexuals do not date transgender people and that, in regards to transgender people, "there (sic) addition" had "watered down" the rights of queer people. When Gould mentioned that he was a gay man who has dated trans men and called the comments bigoted and exclusionary, Boyd blocked and removed him.

After the comments sparked public backlash, Boyd would say that they were from a private conversation, claim that they were "taken out of context," and he also apologized if what he said hurt the feelings of anyone in the transgender community.

== See also ==
- List of radio stations in Australia
