= 101FM =

4CBL
- Logan, Queensland; Australia
- Broadcast area: Logan RA1 ()
- Frequency: 101.1 MHz
- Branding: 101FM

Programming
- Language: English
- Format: Community radio

Ownership
- Owner: Radio Logan Inc.

History
- First air date: 18 November 1988
- Call sign meaning: Community Broadcasting Logan, 4 for Queensland

Technical information
- Licensing authority: ACMA
- ERP: 4,000 watts
- HAAT: 106 m
- Transmitter coordinates: 27°37′24″S 153°8′50″E

Links
- Public licence information: Profile
- Website: https://101fm.com.au/

101 FM (call sign 4CBL) is a community radio station broadcasting from Logan City, Queensland. Regular transmissions started in November 1988 and continue up until the present day. The station's transmitter is situated at Springwood and its coverage area includes the Sunshine Coast and Gold Coast regions of eastern Queensland.

== History ==
Radio Logan Incorporated was established in 1984 after Logan City Council advertised for interested persons to establish a community radio station. The push for a municipal radio station was spearheaded by then Division 10 Councillor Tom O'Neil and the Council Public Relations Department, with the reasoning that as Logan had reached "city" status, a local radio station was needed. The issue was debated at a public meeting, attended by a small group of Logan residents, that the council convened in 1984.

The purpose of creating Radio Logan Incorporated was to provide the Logan community with news, entertainment, music, current affairs and information on local events and issues affecting the lifestyle of the community of which it serves.

Within the first year of the organisation's establishment, council gave access to broadcast from the council premises at 4 Karrawatha Street, Springwood, where the water towers are situated, which happens to be the highest point in Logan City.

After two years and four test transmissions, Radio Logan Incorporated was granted its licence in September 1988 with the start of permanent transmission on 18 November 1988.

The first on-air announcer was David Jull, who, before entering politics, worked in commercial radio and television.

The station's first test transmission took place at the residence of J. Horrocks (101 FM technical director). Three further tests and initial permanent broadcasting were done from a demountable studio situated behind the water tower in Karrawatha Street, Springwood.

We stayed on this land for seven years; this site is where the transmitter is still situated (along with a number of others) on top of one of the water towers.

In 1992 the state government wanted to build a new police precinct, so did a deal with Logan City Council. Council would get the land and premises of the old police station, plus two other properties in return for another parcel of later further down the road on which to build the new police Station.

The deal was made, and as council knew how we were trying to find a more suitable place to relocate our studio to, offered us the use of the old police station at 8 Railway Parade, Logan Central. So once refurbishment was completed we moved in, in 1993.

The station's call sign is 4CBL which aligns it with the areas of primary service: the communities of Logan, Beenleigh and Beaudesert. However, its signal is heard south to the New South Wales border, north to the Sunshine Coast, east to the islands of Moreton Bay and West to the Toowoomba Ranges.
