= ABC Far North =

Australia
- Broadcast area: Far North Queensland
- Frequencies: 106.7 MHz FM Cairns and others as listed

Programming
- Format: Talk

Ownership
- Owner: Australian Broadcasting Corporation

History
- First air date: 20 January 1950

Technical information
- Transmitter coordinates: 16°55′00.83″S 145°46′04.71″E

Links
- Website: https://www.abc.net.au/farnorth/

ABC Far North is an ABC Local Radio station based in Cairns. The station broadcasts to Far North Queensland. This includes the towns of Cooktown, Mossman, Innisfail, Weipa and up to the Torres Strait Islands.

The station began broadcasting as 4QY in 1950, although the 4AT transmitter opened earlier in 1941. It was originally a relay of the national program. Studios were then built and local programs began on 4 October 1952.

Along with over 20 low-power FM transmitters, the station broadcasts through the following main AM and FM transmitters:

- 4QCC 106.7 FM
- 4QCC/T 105.7 FM
- 4QCC/T 95.5 FM
- 4MS 639 AM
- 4AT 720 AM
- 4QY 801 AM
- 4WP 1044 AM
- 4TI 1062 AM

== See also ==
- List of radio stations in Australia
