= ABC Tropical North =

Australia
- Broadcast area: Mackay
- Frequency: 101.1 mHz FM Mackay

Programming
- Format: Talk

Ownership
- Owner: Australian Broadcasting Corporation

History
- First air date: 1951

Technical information
- Transmitter coordinates: 21°08′24.94″S 149°11′21.79″E

Links
- Website: https://www.abc.net.au/tropic/

ABC Tropical North is an ABC Local Radio station based in Mackay and broadcasting to the surrounding region in Queensland. This includes the towns of Proserpine, Sarina, Bowen and the Whitsunday Islands.

The station began broadcasting as 4QA in 1951 on 720 AM (later 756) as a relay of the national program. Studios were then built and local programs began in 1955. The station now broadcasts through the following main FM transmitters along with a number of low-power FM repeaters:

- 4QAA 101.1 FM
- 4QAA/T 104.9 FM
- 4QAA/T 91.7 FM

== See also ==
- List of radio stations in Australia
