= ABC Wide Bay =

- Australia
- Broadcast area: Wide Bay – Burnett, Queensland
- Frequencies: 855 kHz AM Wide Bay & Burnett; 1566 kHz AM Gympie; 100.1 mHz FM Wide Bay

Programming
- Format: Talk

Ownership
- Owner: Australian Broadcasting Corporation

History
- First air date: 14 January 1948

Links
- Website: https://www.abc.net.au/widebay/

ABC Wide Bay is an ABC Local Radio station based in Bundaberg broadcasting to the Wide Bay–Burnett region of Queensland. This includes the cities and towns of Maryborough, Gympie, Hervey Bay and Mundubbera.

== History ==
The station began broadcasting as 4QB in 1948 originally as a relay of the national program. The station was originally based in Maryborough, the traditional capital of the Wide-Bay region.

The station negotiated with the School of Arts in 1950 to rent out a small office on the first floor of the school's building for broadcast, and thus it was opened 20 November, 1950. Programs originally consisted of music and local information. The station's local services increased over the years, and in 1952 the first proper newsroom was established with Don Harvey at the helm.

In October of that year a new Rural Officer position was established and that person was responsible for putting to air a special rural program every day. In 1954 and 1962 new renovations to the transmitters meant that the station could reach many more communities outside the Maryborough region.

In 1990 the station moved from its Maryborough studios to a new studio at 58 Woongarra Street in Bundaberg, to better broadcast to the region. The ABC still administered a Maryborough bureau, on 146 Bazaar Street, which staffed a rural reporter to cover news from that region.

The ABC closed its Maryborough bureau in the late 1990s to early 2000s.

In April 2022, the ABC opened a new Hervey Bay bureau to improve its coverage of the Fraser Coast. Staffed by two journalists, the new Hervey Bay bureau on Boat Harbour Drive was established as part of the ABC's regional expansion. To mark the bureau's opening, ABC Wide Bay held an outside broadcast at Scarness Jetty, which was attended by Gardening Australia personality Costa Georgiadis.

== Transmitters ==
The station broadcasts through the following main AM and FM transmitters along with low power FM repeaters:

Station	Location	Frequency	First air date	Power	Transmitter Coordinates
4QB	Pialba	855 kHz AM	14 January 1948	10,000 watts	25°18′14″S 152°47′10″E
4QO	Eidsvold	855 kHz AM	1965	10,000 watts	25°24′28″S 151°7′23″E
4GM	Gympie	1566 kHz AM	17 August 1951	200 watts	26°12′39″S 152°41′21″E
4QBB	Mount Goonaneman	100.1 MHz FM	1994	80,000 watts ERP	25°25′37″S 152°7′3″E

== Local Programs ==
ABC Wide Bay broadcasts four local programs throughout the week.

- Wide Bay Rural Report 6:15am to 6:30am – presented by Megan Hughes
- Breakfast 6:35am to 8:00am – presented by David Dowsett
- Mornings 10:00am to 11:00am – presented by Ross Kay
- Saturday Breakfast 6:00am to 8:00am – presented by Ross Kay

At all other times the station is a relay of ABC Brisbane, which itself at times broadcasts networked programming from across Australia.

== Staff ==
As of 2021, there are a total of ten full-time staff and several casuals at ABC Wide Bay.

== See also ==
- List of radio stations in Australia
