= ABC Gold Coast =

- Lower Beechmont, Queensland; Australia
- Broadcast area: Gold Coast and Tweed Heads
- Frequency: 91.7 MHz FM
- Branding: ABC Gold Coast

Programming
- Language: English
- Format: National radio

Ownership
- Owner: ABC Radio and Regional Content; (Australian Broadcasting Corporation)
- Sister stations: List: ABC Classic; ABC Country; ABC Jazz; ABC NewsRadio; ABC RN; Double J; triple j; triple j Unearthed

History
- First air date: 1983 (as 4SO)
- Former frequencies: 1590 kHz AM (1952–1978); 1593 kHz AM (1978–1989)
- Call sign meaning: 4 – Queensland; ABCRegional Radio

Technical information
- ERP: 25 kW
- Transmitter coordinates: 28°2′7″S 153°14′29″E

Links
- Website: ABC Gold Coast

ABC Gold Coast (ACMA callsign: 4ABCRR) is an ABC Local Radio station. Based in the suburb of Mermaid Beach, the station broadcasts to the Gold Coast and Tweed Heads in New South Wales.

The station started life in 1952 as 4SO, operating as a relay from Toowoomba of the ABC Regional Network, transmitting on a frequency of 1590 kHz (changed in 1978 to 1593 kHz to fit in with the revised 9 kHz spacing).

Its persona changed dramatically in 1983 when it was branded as 1593AM 4SO Gold Coast Rock to target the youth market, then became 91.7 ABC Coast FM when it began broadcasting on the FM band in 1989. The station is now a news, current affairs and adult contemporary music station. In 2013 the station changed its name to 91.7 ABC Gold Coast in alignment with the nomenclature used for other ABC Local Radio stations across Australia. In 2019, the frequency was dropped from the stations name, in alignment with other ABC Local Radio stations across Australia.

The station airs locally focused programming from 5 am to 11 am and from 3pm to 6pm Monday to Friday, and 6am to 10am on Saturdays. At all other times, the station airs networked programming relayed from ABC Radio Brisbane and from across Australia.

As of January 2026 the on air line up is:

- Breakfast (5am - 8am): Trevor Jackson.
- Mornings (8.30am - 11am): Nicole Dyer.
- Drive (3pm - 6pm): Bern Young.
- Saturday Breakfast (6am - 10am): Tom Forbes.

== See also ==
- List of radio stations in Australia
