= 4CC (AM) =

Coordinates: 23.842101°S 151.250819°E

- Gladstone, Queensland; Australia
- Broadcast area: Central Queensland; Rockhampton RA1
- Frequency: 927 kHz
- Branding: 4CC

Programming
- Format: Classic Hits

Ownership
- Owner: ARN Media; (Radio Gladstone Pty Ltd)
- Sister stations: 4RO; KIX Country

History
- Former call signs: 4CD

Technical information
- Power: 5 kW Gladstone; 2 kW Biloela; 500 W Rockhampton
- Repeaters: 98.3 MHz Agnes Water; 666 kHz Biloela; 1584 kHz Rockhampton

Links
- Website: www.4cc.com.au

4CC is a Classic Hits commercial radio station broadcasting to Central Queensland from Gladstone, Australia on 927 kHz AM.

== History ==
4CC began broadcasting to the Central Queensland cities of Gladstone and Rockhampton in 1872 under the callsign 4CD, which remained its name until November 1985 when the station was purchased by Wesgo. For the remainder of the 1980s, 4CC's format focused on the lucrative 25–39 age group, playing an Adult Contemporary music format. The station also maintained local programming from 5 am – 12 pm each day of the week. Prominent breakfast personalities during the 1970s and 1980s included Noel Roberts (who became station manager), Grant Cassidy, Dales Whyte, Iain Edwards and Chris Costello.

In August 1989 the station was sold to Richmond River Broadcasters, owner of Lismore station 2LM.

In the 1990s, 4CC broadcast a top 40 format, branded as Hot Hits 4CC, to distant itself from cross-town rival 4RO, which broadcast a classic hits format. In 1998, the station was purchased by DMG Regional Radio, and aligned to a classic hits format used by sister stations 4HI Emerald, 4ZR Roma, 4LM Mount Isa, 4GC Charters Towers, 4MK Mackay, 4CA FM Cairns, 4AM Mareeba and 4TO Townsville. The station used the slogan "The Best Songs of All Time"; all local programming outside of breakfast was scrapped in favour of syndicated programming from the network's Townsville hub.

This format remained the same until 2004 when DMG Regional Radio merged with RG Capital to become Macquarie Regional RadioWorks, and as a result there were some program changes. The overnight Gold Coast produced programs that had originally aired on 4RO such as The Nitemix, Nelly at Night (later to become Talking Back The Night), the Partymix and Sunday Night At The Groovies were all transferred over to 4CC, which enabled 4RO to begin taking talkback programs out of Sydney. However, due to conditions placed upon the takeover, Macquarie Southern Cross Media had to sell several stations to other parties. Many of them, including 4CC, was sold to Prime Media Group.

In 2008, the station trialled a local afternoon show but was eventually replaced with the networked "Jonathan Coleman Experience".

In April 2009, the station changed format to the active rock/classic rock hybrid format used by Zinc 96 on the Sunshine Coast. Branded as Zinc 927, the changes came in conjunction with similar changes up the east coast of Queensland for various other Prime stations. 4CA FM Cairns, Sea FM Townsville and 4MK FM Mackay were all rebranded to Zinc. 4CA and 4MK retained their callsigns by taking over the AM Easymix stations in Cairns and Mackay and becoming more talkback-focused similar to what 4RO in Rockhampton had already become.

In August 2013, Grant Broadcasters acquired the station and Prime Media's other nine radio stations in Queensland. On 2 June 2014, the station dropped the Zinc branding and format, relaunching as "Your Station" 4CC, returning the familiar call sign.

On 14 January 2016, 4CC changed format to a News Talk Music format to bring the station in line with its sister station 4RO, this also included a Slogan change to that of sister station 4RO "News Talk and The Music You Love". The change went live across all four of its Transmitters on the morning of 18 January 2016 with some negative feedback from longtime listeners on both their Facebook page and also via their talk back hotline about the loss of music in favor of a talk-back format during the mornings. The morning presenter was replaced by Michael J. Bailey and Afternoon Drive has been replaced with Al Doblo. Most content at this time is networked from 4RO excluding ADs and Station ID.

On 21 March 2016, after trialing a Talkback Format with negative feedback from listeners, 4CC returned to a Classic Hits Format and once again started using the two slogans "Your Station, 4CC" and "The Station You Know and Love Is Back, 4CC".

In November 2021, 4CC, along with other stations owned by Grant Broadcasters, were acquired by the Australian Radio Network. This deal gave Grant's stations, including 4CC, to access ARN's iHeartRadio platform in regional areas. The deal was finalized on 30 November 2021.
