= ABC North West Queensland =

- Australia
- Broadcast area: North West Queensland
- Frequencies: 106.5 MHz FM Mount Isa; 567 kHz AM Julia Creek; 1485 kHz AM Hughenden

Programming
- Format: Talk

Ownership
- Owner: Australian Broadcasting Corporation

History
- First air date: 1986

Technical information
- Transmitter coordinates: 20°43′23.92″S 139°29′38.40″E

Links
- Website: https://www.abc.net.au/northwest/

ABC North West Queensland is an ABC Local Radio station based in Mount Isa. The station broadcasts to the North West region of Queensland, which includes the towns of Cloncurry, Julia Creek, Hughenden and Normanton.

The station began broadcasting as 4MI in 1986 on 1080 AM. Now there are a number of low power FM transmitters as well as these main transmitters:

- 4ISA 106.5 FM
- 4JK 567 AM
- 4HU 1485 AM

== See also ==
- List of radio stations in Australia
