= 4RFM =

- Moranbah; Australia
- Broadcast area: Central Highlands
- Frequency: 96.9 MHz

Programming
- Language: Australian English
- Format: Music, Talk, News

Ownership
- Owner: Rock FM Association Inc.

History
- First air date: 1998

Technical information
- ERP: 8196
- Transmitter coordinates: 21°55′39″S 148°19′3″E

Links
- Webcast: http://210.7.48.48:8830/listen.pls
- Website: www.4rfm.com.au

Rock FM (callsign: 4RFM) is a Community radio station based in Moranbah, Queensland, Australia.
