= Jazz Radio 94.1FM =

94.1FM Gold Coast
Gold Coast, Queensland; Australia
- Broadcast area: Gold Coast RA1 ()
- Frequency: 94.1 MHz FM
- Branding: 94.1FM Gold Coast

Programming
- Language: English
- Format: Classic hits

Ownership
- Owner: Gold Coast Community Radio Association Inc.

History
- First air date: 8 November 2001

Technical information
- ERP: 25,000 watts
- HAAT: 447 m
- Transmitter coordinates: 27°58′11″S 153°12′48″E

Links
- Webcast: Official website
- Website: Official website

”94.1FM Gold Coast” is a radio station in Australia.
