= Triple M Mackay & The Whitsundays =

Adult contemporary radio station in Mackay, Queensland

- Mackay, Queensland; Australia
- Broadcast area: Mackay and the Whitsundays

Programming
- Language: English
- Format: Adult contemporary
- Affiliations: Triple M

Ownership
- Owner: Southern Cross Austereo; (Whitsundays Broadcasters Pty Ltd)

History
- Call sign meaning: 4 – Queensland; RG Capital Mackay

Technical information
- Licensing authority: ACMA
- Repeater: 92.3 FM Airlie Beach

Links
- Public licence information: Profile
- Website: 98.7 Sea FM

Triple M Mackay & The Whitsundays (ACMA callsign: 4RGM) is an Australian radio station in Queensland. Owned and operated as part of Southern Cross Austereo's Triple M network, it broadcasts an adult contemporary format to Mackay, Queensland and the Whitsunday Islands. First broadcast on 21 September 1999, it was established by RG Capital – later sold to Macquarie Regional RadioWorks and Southern Cross Media Group – and is based in the Suncorp building on Victoria Street in Mackay, alongside sister station Hit Network.

== Programming ==
- 5 am-9 am Jay & Dave for breakfast
- 9am-12pm Mickey D
- 3pm-4pm Troy Ellis
- 4pm-6pm the rush hour with Dobbo and Eliott
- 7pm10pm triple m nights with Dave gleeson

10pm-12pm triple m Aussie homegrown with Matty o
