= 4AM (AM) =

Radio station in Mareeba, Queensland

- Mareeba, Queensland; Australia
- Frequency: 558 kHz AM

Programming
- Language: English
- Format: Music, personality, talk

Ownership
- Owner: Broadcast Operations Group; (Coastal Broadcasters Pty Ltd)
- Sister stations: 4KZ; 4AY; KOOL FM; KIK FM; FAB FM

History
- First air date: Sept 15, 1967
- Former frequencies: 560 kHz
- Call sign meaning: Atherton Mareeba (original licensee)

Technical information
- Licensing authority: ACMA
- Power: 5,000 watts on 558, 1,000 watts on 1422
- Transmitter coordinates: 17°1′31″S 145°28′37″E on 558, 16°30′0″S 145°27′1″E on 1422
- Translators: 1422 Port Douglas; 91.3 Ravenshoe

Links
- Public licence information: Profile
- Website: http://www.4am.com.au

4AM is a radio station in Mareeba, Queensland on 558kHz AM. 4AM is also heard in Cairns, and on 1422kHz AM in Port Douglas.

== On air line up ==
Monday to Friday

- 5-9 am: Adrian 'AJ' Harding Breakfast Show
- 9-12 pm: Mornings with Chris Smith
- 12-1 pm: Lunchbox Lineup with Glenn Johns
- 1-4 pm: Gabby Stark
- 4-7 pm: Drive with Rach
- 7-8 pm: Money News
- 8-12 am: Talk Tonight
- 12-5 am: Talk Overnight

Saturday

- 6-12 pm: Saturday Breakfast including Radio Classifieds between 7 and 9.
- 12-6 pm: The Best Songs of All Time
- 6-12 am: Saturday Night Live with Pete Graham
- 12-4 am: Talk Overnight
- 4-6 am: Hi Tide Fishing Show

Sunday

- 8-12 pm: Sunday Gold with Bob Harding.
- 12-6 pm: Sunday Funday with Taleigha
- 6-12 am: The Easy Mix
- 12-4 am: Talk Overnight
- 4-6 am: Hi Tide Fishing Show

== See also ==
- List of radio stations in Australia
