= Rise 96.5 =

Radio station in Brisbane, Queensland

Rise 96.5 (4FRB)
- Brisbane, Queensland; Australia
- Broadcast area: ACMA License Area Brisbane RA1.
- Frequency: 96.5 MHz

Programming
- Language: English
- Format: Christian radio

Ownership
- Owner: Family Radio Ltd
- Sister stations: Inspire Digital

History
- First air date: 1 November 2001
- Former names: 96five, 96five Family Radio
- Call sign meaning: 4 for Queensland plus Family Radio Brisbane

Technical information
- Licensing authority: ACMA
- ERP: 12,000 watts
- HAAT: 283 m
- Transmitter coordinates: 27°27′47″S 152°56′49″E

Links
- Public licence information: Profile
- Website: rise965.com

Rise 96.5 (call sign: 4FRB) is a Christian community radio station operated by Family Radio Ltd in Brisbane, Australia. The radio station is funded by sponsorship, donations, fundraising and pledges. A separate program output is aired on the stations DAB+ Digital Radio channel called Inspire Hope.

== Programming ==
Rise 96.5 describes itself as "suitable for the entire family" and uses the tag line "Uplifting Radio" to describe the content it broadcasts. The station's music playlist consists of music from contemporary Christian artists as well as mainstream artists. The station claims that listeners will hear no bad language.

On air shows include

- "Ken and Nicky" from 6am to 10am Weekdays
- "Uplifting Radio with Steff, from 10am to Midday Weekdays
- "Uplifting Radio with Tim" from Midday to 3pm Weekdays
- "The Iris and Joe Show" from 3pm til 7pm Weekdays
- "The Daily with Cam Want" from 9pm til Midnight Weekdays
- "Sunday Celebration with Alex Milne" from 6am to 9am on Sundays

The schedule also features numerous family segments and messages from family and ministry figures, which air every hour, and specialist programs such as Focus on the Family, Insight for Living with Chuck Swindoll, and Life Matters with Ben Windle, that deal with Christian, mental health and family issues. The station also airs regular outside broadcasts at events and locations including primary schools and community events.

== Studios ==
The station's studios are in the Brisbane suburb of Taringa. The station's transmission facilities are located at a shared broadcast facility on Mt. Coot-tha.

== Community outreach ==
The radio station organises and liaises with a number of community outreach programs and initiatives through its ministry. The breakfast show SOS Calls assists an individual or family in need. The station also has media partnerships with Brisbane and international non-profit organisations including SU QLD, Red Frogs, Feed the Hungy, and Compassion.

== See also ==
- List of radio stations in Australia
