= Kool FM (Innisfail) =

Australian radio station

Coordinates: 17.523347°S 146.031844°E

4ZKZ is an Australian commercial radio station located in Innisfail, Queensland.

The station is currently broadcasting as Kool FM.

Kool FM broadcasts on three separate FM frequencies in the Far North Queensland area. The station is heard on 98.3 FM in Innisfail, 94.9 in Babinda and 91.9 FM in Cardwell, Queensland.

Established in 1997, the station's programming consists of a contemporary hit radio format, targeting the younger demographics in the listening area.

NQ Radio claims on its website that Kool FM is one of only two commercial radio stations to directly serve the towns of Innisfail, Tully and Mission Beach.
