= 4EB =

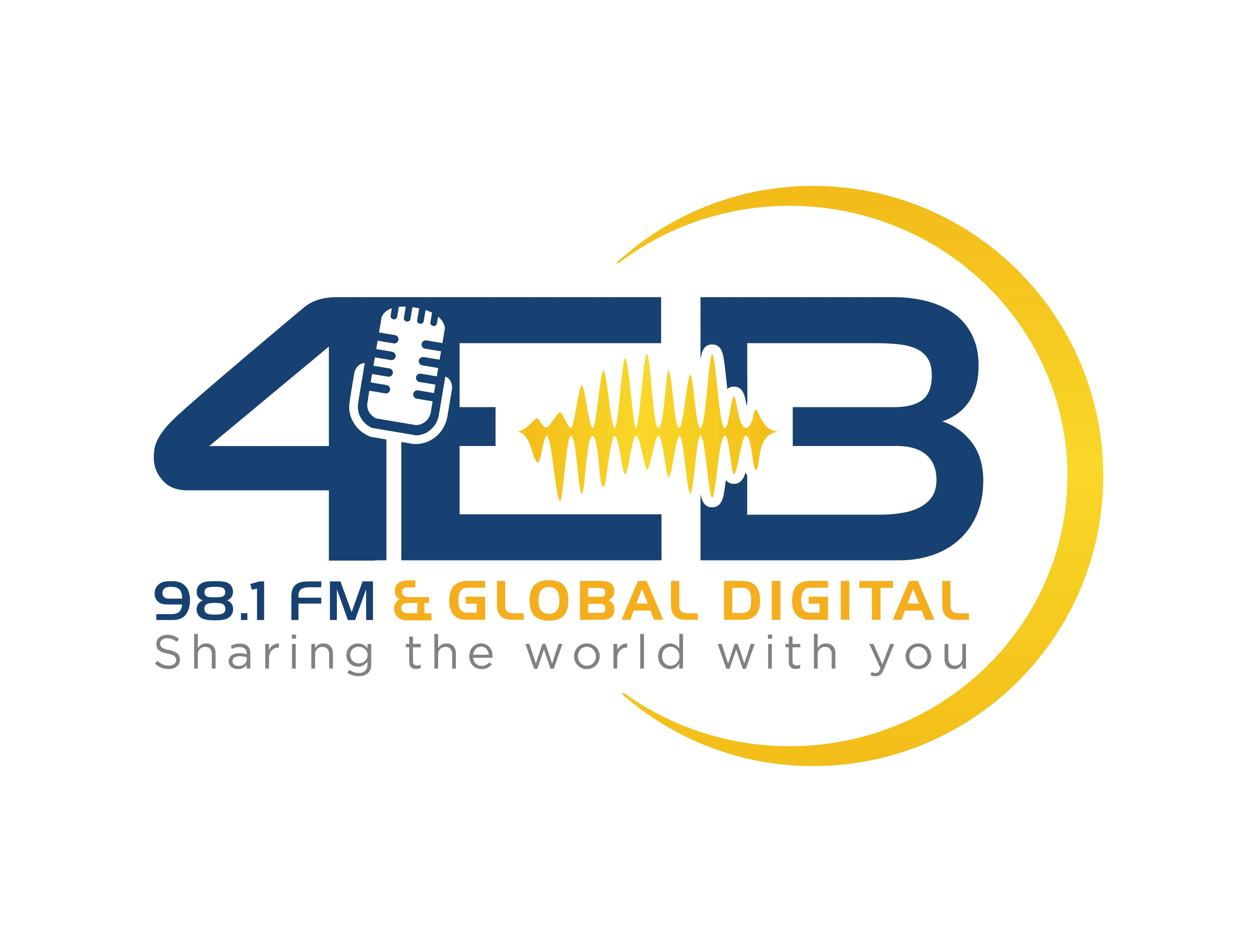
- Brisbane, Queensland; Australia
- Broadcast area: Brisbane RA1 ()
- Frequency: 98.1 MHz FM

Programming
- Language: Multilingual
- Format: Variety

Ownership
- Owner: Ethnic Broadcasting Association of Queensland Ltd

History
- First air date: 1 December 1979
- Former frequencies: 1053 kHz (1979–2002)
- Call sign meaning: 4 = Queensland; Ethnic; Broadcasting

Technical information
- ERP: 12,000 watts
- HAAT: 233 m
- Transmitter coordinates: 27°27′47″S 152°56′49″E

Links
- Website: Official website

RADIO 4EB FM is a multicultural community radio station based in Brisbane, Queensland, broadcasting across South-East Queensland. Its output is multicultural, broadcasting in over 55 languages from around the world on 98.1FM & GlobalDigitalFM.

== Language Program ==
Afghan	Albanian	Arabic	Bangla	Bosnian	Chinese	Colombian	Cook Islands
Croatian	Czech	Dutch	Ethiopian	Fijian	Filipino	Finnish	French
Four EB (any other)	German	Greek	Hungarian	Indian	Irish	Italian	Japanese
Korean	Kurdish	Latin-American	Lithuanian	Macedonian	Maltese	Maori	Multicultural (Mixed)
Nepalese	Niue	Pakistani	Persian	Polish	Portuguese	Punjabi	Romanian
Russian	Samoan	Scottish	Serbian	Slovak	Slovenian	Spanish	Sri Lankan
Tamil	Telugu (from Southern India)	Thai	Tokelauan	Tongan	Turkish	Ukrainian	Vietnamese

== See also ==
- List of radio stations in Australia
- The Wire, an Australian current affairs program broadcast through the Community Radio Satellite
