= Hit103.1 Townsville =

hit103.1 Townsville (4TSV)
Townsville, Queensland; Australia
- Broadcast area: Townsville RA1
- Frequency: 103.1 MHz
- Branding: hit103.1

Programming
- Language: English
- Format: Contemporary hit radio
- Affiliations: Hit Network

Ownership
- Owner: Southern Cross Austereo
- Sister stations: 102.3 Triple M

History
- First air date: 1932; 26 January 1994 (on FM)
- Former call signs: 4RR (1932–1994); Hot FM (1994–2016)
- Former frequencies: 891 kHz AM (1978–1994); 890 kHz AM (1932–1978)

Technical information
- ERP: 100 kW
- Repeaters: 93.1 FM Mount Inkerman; 107.9 FM Bowen

Links
- Website: Official website

hit103.1 Townsville (call sign 4TSV) is an Australian commercial radio station in Queensland. Owned and operated as part of Southern Cross Austereo's Hit Network, it broadcasts a contemporary hit radio format to Townsville, Queensland. First broadcast in 1932 as 4AY on 890 kHz AM, changing to 891 kHz in 1978. The station operated under call-sign 4RR from 1987 until, in 1994, the station relaunched on the FM band as active rock-formatted Hot FM. At the time, the station was owned by Rural Press - later sold to DMG Regional Radio, then Macquarie Regional RadioWorks and Southern Cross Media Group.

On 16 August 2016, a repeater was switched on from Mount Inkerman, south of Home Hill, covering the Burdekin region 93.1 MHz.

On 15 December 2016, Hot FM was relaunched as hit103.1 in line with other SCA Hit Network stations.
