= Star 102.7 =

Coordinates: 16.925397°S 145.775178°E

Cairns, Queensland; Australia
- Broadcast area: Cairns
- Frequency: 102.7 MHz FM
- Branding: Star 102.7

Programming
- Format: Hot AC

Ownership
- Owner: ARN; (Radio Cairns Pty Ltd)
- Sister stations: 4CA

Technical information
- Repeater: 92.5 MHz FM Mossman

Links
- Website: www.star1027.com.au

Star 102.7 (ACMA callsign: 4CCA) is an adult contemporary-formatted commercial radio station based in Cairns, Queensland, Australia, owned by ARN.

== History ==
Prior to 2009, the station was known as 4CA-FM, and was the second FM station in the market after 103.5 Hot FM. 4CA-FM was purchased by Prime Media Group Limited in 2005 from Macquarie Regional RadioWorks, and was rebranded as 102.7 Zinc FM on 23 March 2009. At that time, the 4CA branding returned to sister station 4EL.

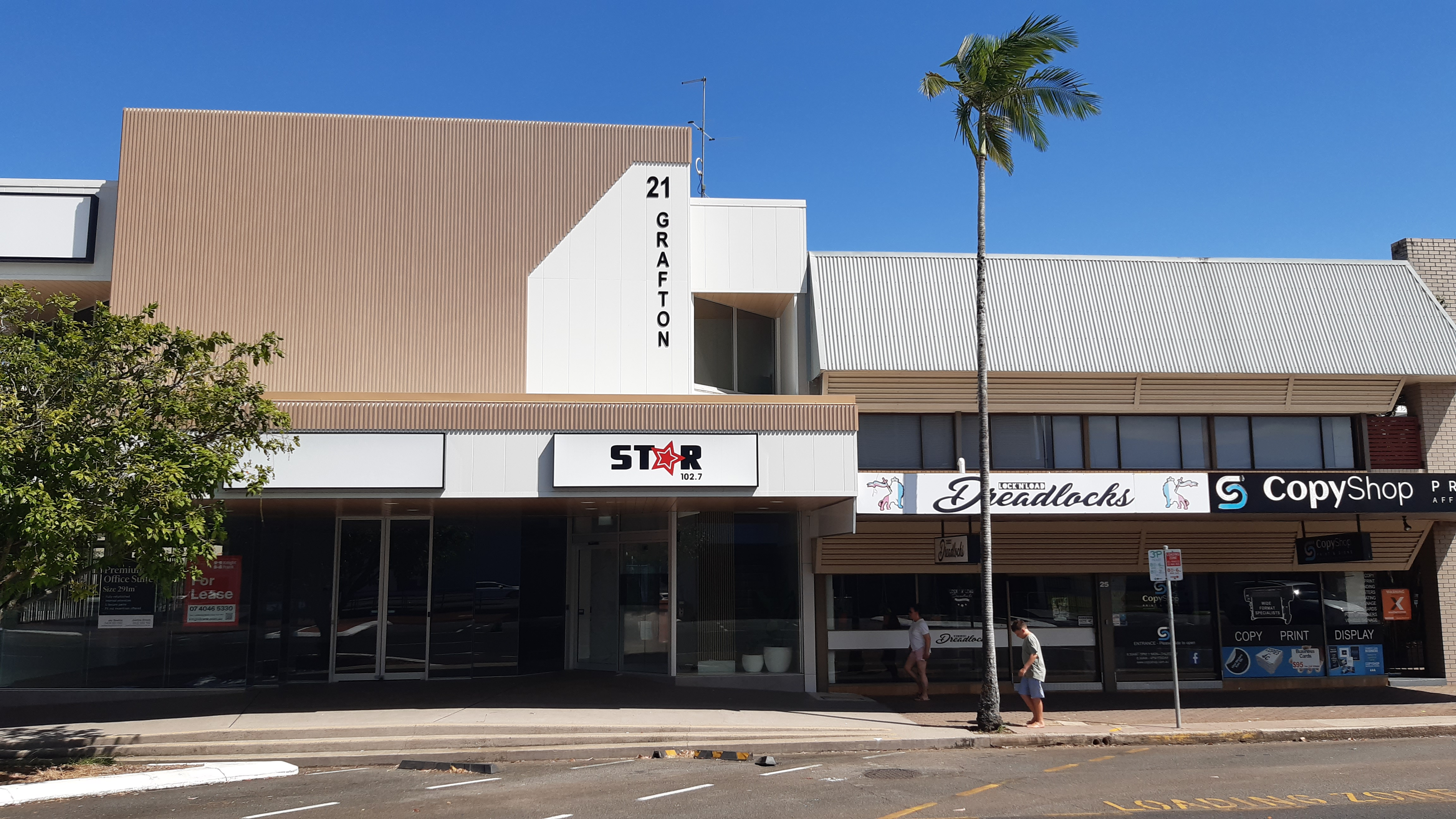
The station's headquarters in Cairns

In August 2013, Grant Broadcasters acquired the station and Prime Media's other nine radio stations in Queensland.

Star 102.7 is a commercial radio station in Cairns, Queensland, broadcasting an adult contemporary format. The station was rebranded from Zinc 102.7 to Star 102.7 by Grant Broadcasters in April 2016.

In November 2021, Star 102.7, along with other stations owned by Grant Broadcasters, were acquired by the Australian Radio Network. This deal will allow Grant's stations, including Star 102.7, to access ARN's iHeartRadio platform in regional areas. The deal was finalized on 4 January 2022. It is expected Star 102.7 will integrate with ARN's KIIS Network, but will retain its current name according to the press release from ARN.

Since then, Star 102.7 has consistently remained the most listened-to station in Cairns, holding the #1 position for six consecutive years.

In the 2024 Xtra Insights Survey for Cairns, Star 102.7 achieved its highest-ever audience, with 77,100 weekly listeners and a 26.1% market share—well ahead across all day parts and weekends. Breakfast hosts Johnny and Inkie led their timeslot with a 28.4% audience share, outperforming Hit 103.5 (16.7%) and Triple M (16.3%).

The station continued its dominance in the 2025 Xtra Insights Survey, increasing its market share to 26.6% and maintaining its lead among all people aged 10+. Breakfast team, Johnny and Inkie also retained the top Breakfast position with a 27.4% share.

Star 102.7 currently reaches 74,200 listeners each week, continuing to lead the Cairns market.

Star 102.7 also boasts the fastest growing audience in Cairns for CUME
