= Zinc 96.1 =

Coordinates: 26.6591004°S 153.0835434°E

- Maroochydore, Queensland; Australia
- Broadcast area: Sunshine Coast, Queensland
- Frequency: 96.1 MHz
- Branding: Zinc 96.1

Programming
- Format: Classic hits

Ownership
- Owner: Australian Radio Network; (Ami Radio Pty Ltd)
- Sister stations: 91.1 Hot FM

Technical information
- Repeater: 100.5 MHz Noosa/Tewantin

Links
- Website: sunshine.radiozinc.com.au

Zinc 96.1 (ACMA callsign: 4NNN) is an adult contemporary-formatted commercial radio station based in Maroochydore, Queensland and broadcasting to the Sunshine Coast, owned by ARN.

== History ==
Zinc was first launched in 1997 as The Heat 96.1 by then-owners Broadcast Operations Group. In July 2005, the station was sold to AMI Radio, owners of former rival Hot 91.1.

In February 2006, the station relaunched as Zinc 96.1, targeting the 40+ demographic, with Jamie Dunn, Jo Beth Taylor, Ian Calder and Johjo Switzer hosting the morning zoo-formatted breakfast show. Both Zinc and Hot were sold in 2007 to Prime Media Group, and in 2013 to Grant Broadcasters.

In November 2021, Zinc 96.1, along with other stations owned by Grant Broadcasters, were acquired by the Australian Radio Network. This deal will allow Grant's stations, including Zinc 96.1, to access ARN's iHeartRadio platform in regional areas. The deal was finalized on 4 January 2022. It is expected Zinc 96.1 will integrate with ARN's Pure Gold Network, but will retain its current name according to the press release from ARN.

== Programming ==
The station is aimed at the over-35 section of the market, male-skewed but female-friendly, playing adult contemporary music.
