= 92.5 Triple M Gold =

92.5 Triple M Gold (4GLD)
- Gold Coast, Queensland, Australia; Australia
- Broadcast area: Gold Coast RA1 ()
- Frequency: 92.5 MHz FM
- Branding: 92.5 Triple M

Programming
- Language: English
- Format: Mainstream rock, Adult contemporary
- Affiliations: Triple M

Ownership
- Owner: Southern Cross Austereo; (Gold Coast FM Pty Ltd)
- Sister stations: 90.9 Sea FM

History
- First air date: 30 September 1967 (as 4GG); 20 March 1989 (as 4GGG)
- Former call signs: 4GG (1967–1989); 4GGG (1989–1992)
- Former frequencies: 1200 kHz AM (1967–1978); 1197 kHz AM (1978–1989)
- Call sign meaning: 4 - Queensland; 92.5 GoLD FM

Technical information
- Power: 25 KW

Links
- Website: 92.5 Triple M Gold Coast

92.5 Triple M Gold (ACMA callsign: 4GLD) is an Australian radio station in Queensland. Owned and operated as part of Southern Cross Austereo's Triple M network, it broadcasts a Mainstream Rock format to Gold Coast, Queensland.

== History ==
The station originally launched as 4GG on the AM band, commencing broadcasts on 30 September 1967, with Frank Warrick reading the first words on air. The station moved to FM in March 1989 as 4GGG. It was rebranded "KROQ" in 1990 by then-owners Hoyts Media, and became Gold FM in 1992.

In November 2019, Gold FM was rebranded as Triple M Gold Coast as part of Southern Cross Austereo’s network rollout. In December 2023, it adopted the name 92.5 Triple M Gold.

== Programming ==
Local programming includes the weekday breakfast show Triple M Breakfast with Leisel Jones, Liam & Spida, which launched on 13 January 2025. Networked Triple M programming carried by the station includes Triple M Nights with Dave Gleeson and Triple M Homegrown.
