= Triple M Townsville =

Adult contemporary radio station in Townsville, Queensland

- Townsville, Queensland; Australia
- Broadcast area: Townsville RA1
- Frequency: 102.3 MHz

Programming
- Language: English
- Format: Adult contemporary
- Affiliations: Triple M

Ownership
- Owner: Southern Cross Austereo
- Sister stations: hit103.1

History
- Former call signs: 4TOFM
- Former frequencies: 1170 kHz, 780 kHz, 774 kHz
- Call sign meaning: 4 – Queensland; Derived from former callsign; TOwnsville

Technical information
- Power: 20 kW
- ERP: 100 kW
- Repeaters: 92.3 FM Mount Inkerman; 98.3 FM Bowen

Links
- Website: Official website

Triple M Townsville (ACMA callsign: 4TOO) is an Australian radio station in Queensland. Owned and operated as part of Southern Cross Austereo's Triple M network, it broadcasts an adult contemporary format to Townsville. First broadcast in 1931 on 1170 kHz AM, later 780 kHz, then became 774 kHz in the 1978 shakeup when all AM transmitters were shuffled into the 9 kHz spacing regime.

In October 1987 it was sold by AWA to Wesgo. In October 1990 it was sold to Mike Willesee.

In 1998 the station moved to the FM band, under ownership of DMG Regional Radio. It was later sold to Macquarie Regional RadioWorks and Southern Cross Media Group. The station broadcasts all North Queensland Cowboys NRL matches, and has previously networked music programming to the regional LocalWorks network.

In January 2015 the 774 kHz AM repeater was shut down, and in December 2015 the masts were demolished.

On 16 August 2016, a repeater was switched on from Mount Inkerman covering the Burdekin region on 92.3 MHz.

On 3 September 2018, 4TOFM was rebranded to Triple M.

On 8 May 2023, Steve Price announced that after 32 years of breakfast radio, this year was to be his last . His last show was on 25 December 2023.

On 3 November 2023, Guy "Cliffo" Clifton and Kate Jeboult were announced as the new hosts of the Triple M Breakfast Show. Cliffo and Kate commenced on 15 January 2024. On the 8th of June 2026, Cliff "CK" Kern replaced Guy "Cliffo" Clifton in a shift swap.

== On-Air Schedule ==
Time	Show
6 am – 9 am	CK and Kate
9 am – 2 pm	Guy "Cliffo" Clifton
3 pm – 4 pm	Lu & Jarch
4 pm – 6 pm	The Rush Hour with Dobbo and Elliot
7 pm – 10 pm	Triple M Nights

== Gallery ==
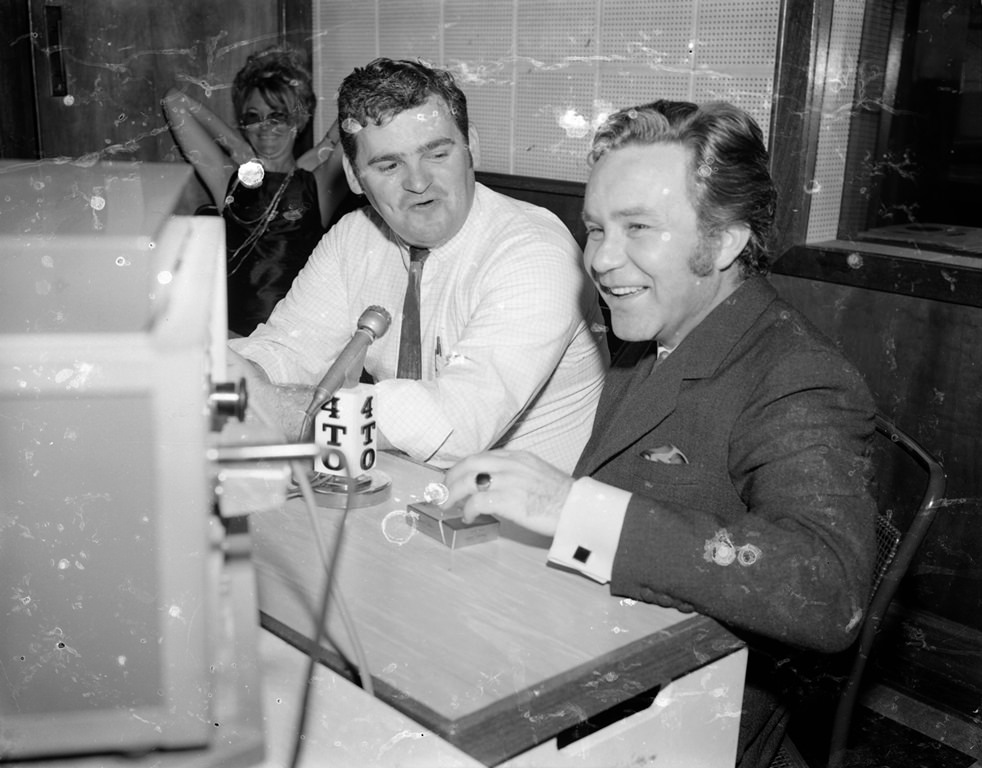
Radio 4TO announcer Stewart 'Stuie' McInnes interviews Johnny O'Keefe, 19 December 1969

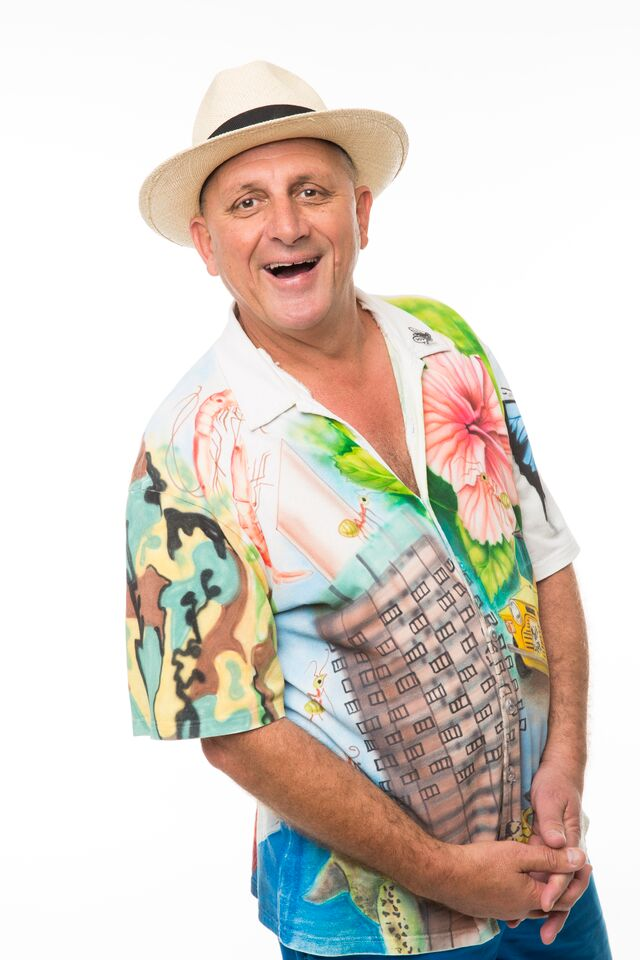
Steve Price, local identity and radio announcer with 4TO for more than 30 "mango seasons", 2016

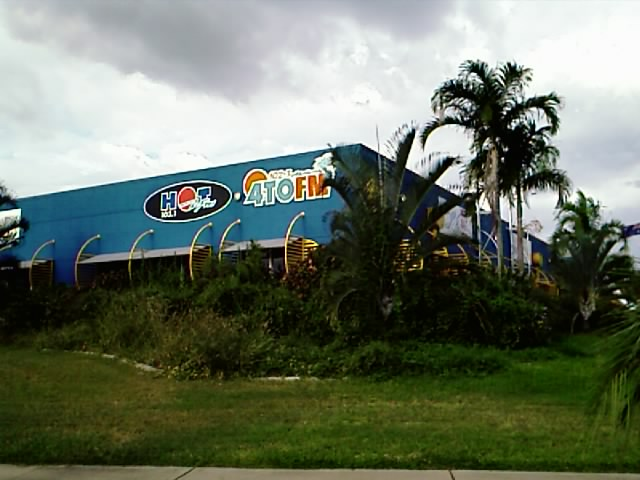
Old photo of 'The Blue Block on Woolcock'

2017 photo of The Blue Block on Woolcock
