= ABC Capricornia =

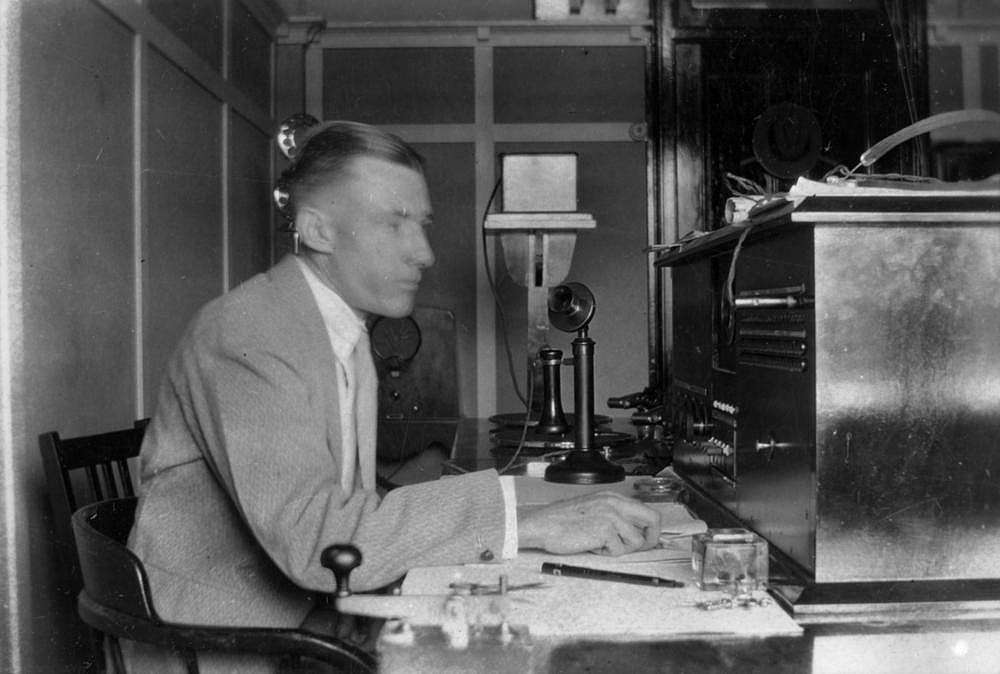
- Australia
- Broadcast area: Rockhampton and The Capricorn Coast
- Frequency: 837 kHz AM

Programming
- Format: Talk

Ownership
- Owner: Australian Broadcasting Corporation

History
- First air date: 29 July 1931

Technical information
- Transmitter coordinates: 23°22′48.22″S 150°30′56.63″E

Links
- Website: https://abc.net.au/capricornia/

4RK, better known as ABC Capricornia is one of the ABC's original regional radio stations, predating the corporation's inception on 1 July 1932. 4RK, as it was known at the time, began broadcasting on 29 July 1931 and was owned by the Australian Broadcasting Company. The power was initially 2 kilowatts. The transmitting equipment was established by Keith Thow of STC.

The station became part of the ABC in 1932, but retained its original callsign. The station was the second regional ABC radio station in Australia and celebrated its 75th birthday in 2006.

The station broadcasts to the region on two powerful AM transmitters – the 4RK transmitter at Gracemere (broadcasting on 837 AM) and the 4QD transmitter at Emerald (broadcasting on 1548 AM). However, ABC Capricornia also uses a number of FM translators dotted throughout the region, enabling the station to be heard clearly in other towns, such as Gladstone and Biloela.

Staff based at ABC Capricornia cover the ABC's television, radio and online operations for the areas including journalists, presenters and producers, as well as an online producer, television reporter, and camera producer/editor.

== Local news ==
Local news bulletins are broadcast on ABC Capricornia at 6:30 am, 7:30 am, and 12:00 pm on weekdays.

Previously ABC Capricornia also aired local news bulletins at 8:30 am and 5:30 pm but under controversial programming changes that were implemented nationwide by the ABC in early 2016, the five local bulletins on ABC Capricornia were reduced to three. The 8:30am bulletin was replaced with a brief 90 second update of local and national headlines read by a locally based newsreader. The 5:30 pm local news bulletin was also axed and was also replaced with a brief national update, read by the producer of the regional drive program.

Until 2014, the station maintained a radio news bureau in the city of Gladstone, 100 kilometres south of Rockhampton, where a radio journalist was based to cover news originating from the Gladstone region. The Gladstone-based reporter also presented ABC Capricornia's local afternoon news bulletins which were broadcast live from Gladstone. However, the ABC controversially announced the permanent closure of the Gladstone bureau and the removal of a Gladstone-based reporter on 24 November 2014 following the Australian Government implementing funding cuts of $254 million to the ABC.

== Local programs ==
=== Weekdays ===
- Breakfast with Inga Stunzner – 6:30am to 10:00am
- Capricornia and Southern Queensland Rural Report with Meg Bolton or Lydia Burton – 6:15am to 6:30am
- Mornings with Cristy-Lee Macqueen – 10:00am to 11:00am

=== Saturday ===
- Saturday Breakfast with Cate Fry – 6:00am to 9:00am
- Capricornia Grandstand with Mick Busby – 9:00am to 10:00am

When local programs are not broadcast the station is a relay of ABC Radio Queensland and ABC Radio Brisbane.

ABC Capricornia is also the originating station for Gardening Talkback, a weekly gardening advice program with Tom Wyatt heard on a number of ABC Local Radio stations throughout Queensland between 10 am and 11 am every Friday morning.

The station's Rural Report is a shared program between ABC Capricornia and ABC Southern Queensland in Toowoomba. The program simulcasts on both stations, and features content relevant to both regions with a Rockhampton-based rural reporter and a Toowoomba-based rural reporter alternating presenting duties.

ABC Capricornia was also the originating station for the network's regional statewide mid-afternoon program, which was presented from the Rockhampton studios between 2 pm and 4 pm weekdays. However, that program was another casualty of the Australian Government's funding cuts to the ABC in 2014. Following the program's conclusion at the end of 2014, it was replaced with a relay of 612 ABC Brisbane's Afternoons with Kelly Higgins-Devine.
