= List of Australian AM radio stations =

This is an incomplete list of AM broadcast (medium wave) radio transmitter stations in Australia, past and present.

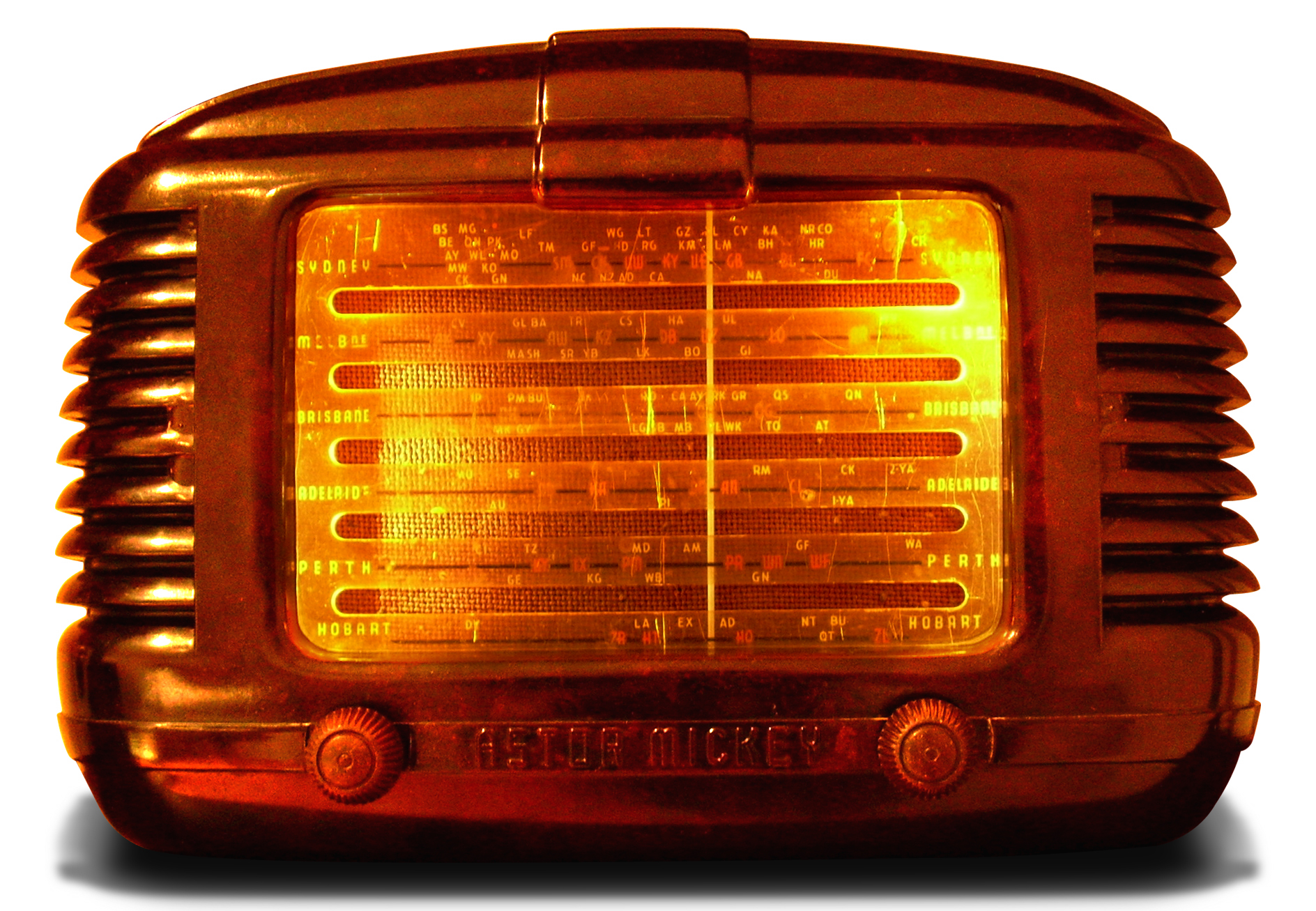
Astor Mickey, 1946

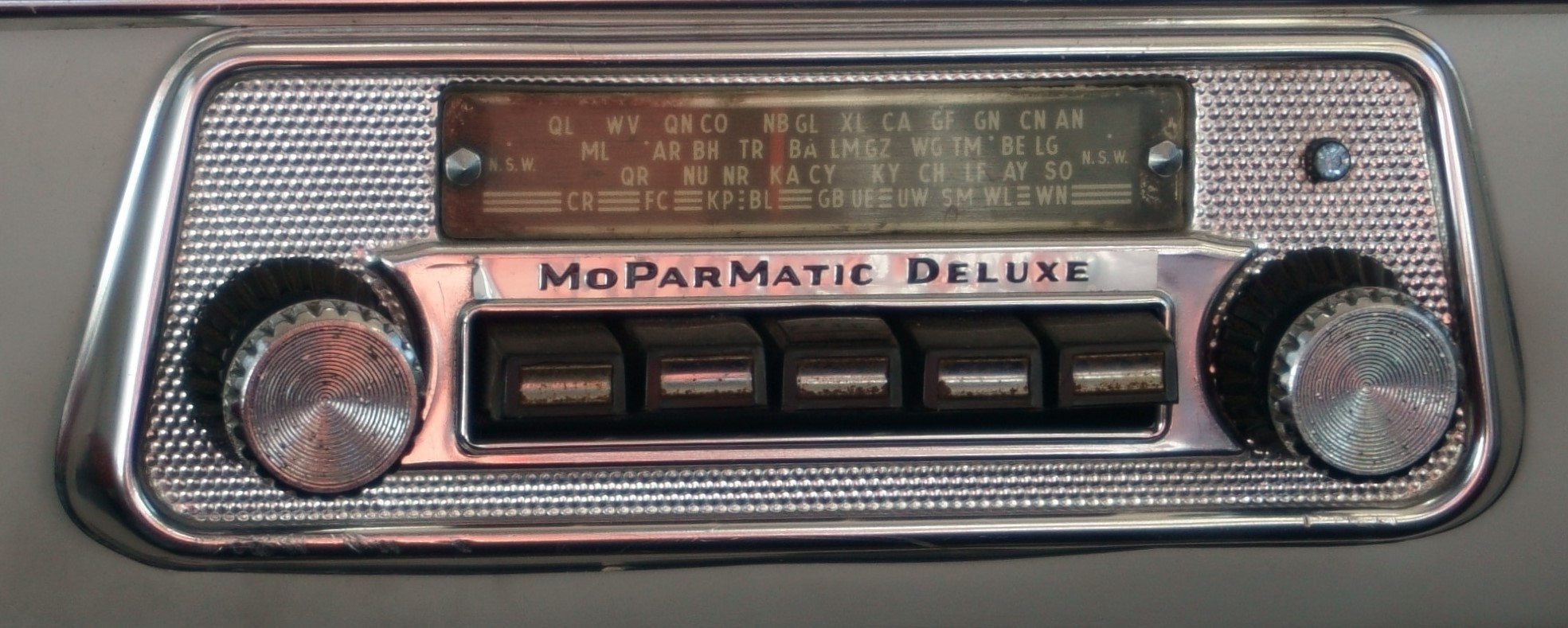
1960s AM car radio with NSW dialplate

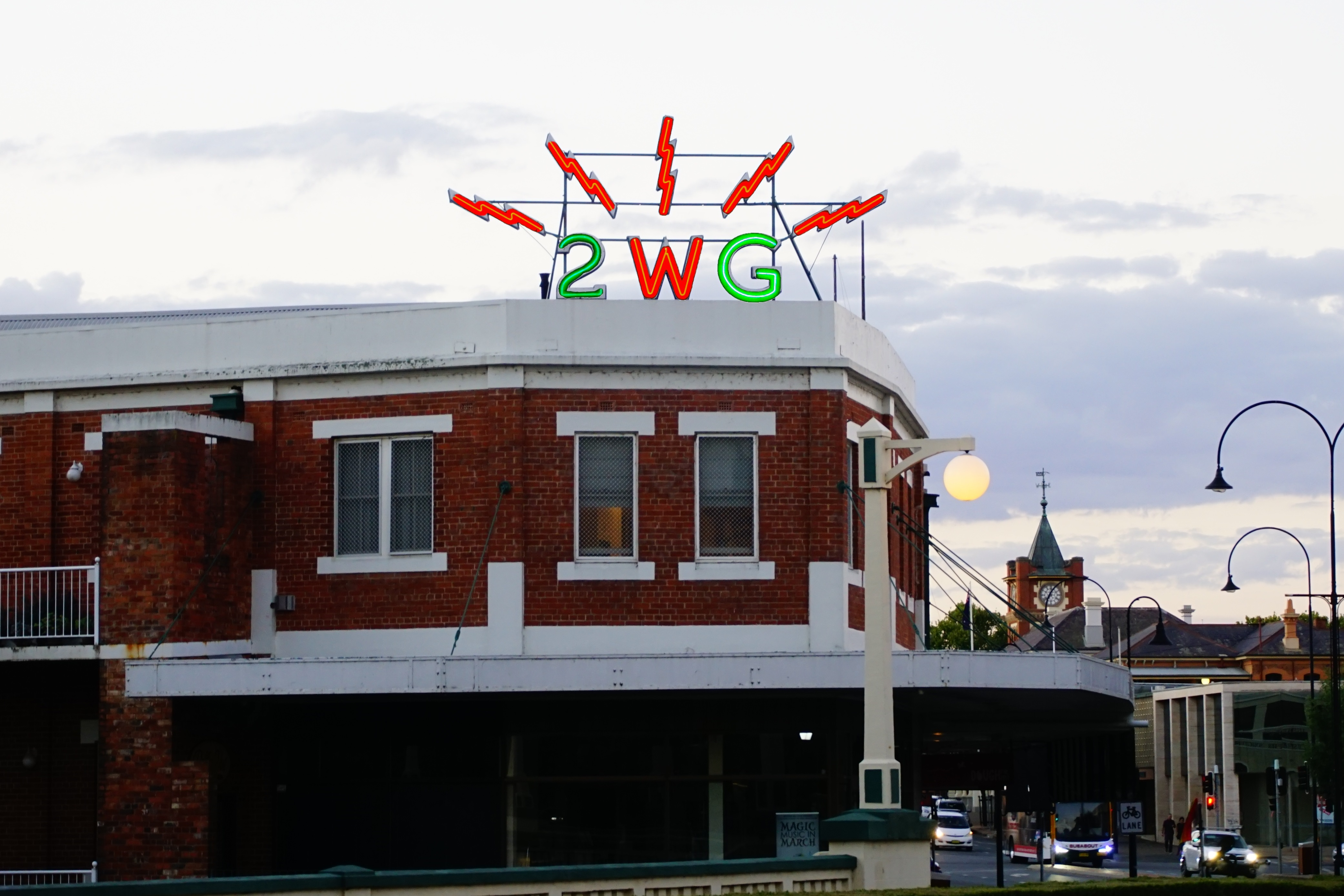
2WG founded in Wagga Wagga 1932

== History ==
See also main article History of broadcasting in Australia

=== The amateur years ===
In the 1920s transmission on the medium wave band was dominated by amateurs who after qualifying by means of an examination and displaying proficiency in Morse code communication (though the band was restricted to telephony), were issued with a call sign consisting of a number denoting for which State the licence was issued (2=New South Wales, 3=Victoria; 4=Queensland; 5=South Australia and Northern Territory; 6=Western Australia; 7=Tasmania) and a two-letter suffix of their own choosing. A licence fee was paid to the Postmaster-General's Department, renewable every five years. Amateurs generally designed and built their own equipment.

One such amateur was Tom Elliot, who in 1921 established station 4CM for its owner Dr McDowall. This would be part of the impetus behind the Government of Queensland establishing 4QG, Australia's first Government-owned station.

Another noted pioneer was Charles Maclurcan, whose station 2CM made many distance records on long and short wave, but apparently never experimented with medium wave, the subject of this article.

Radio receivers were also the province of enthusiasts, who were required to own a listener's licence. Much interest revolved around reception of distant signals ("DX" in the amateurs' terminology) and much valuable experience in the vagaries of radio propagation was gained by the listeners, many of whom collected "QSL" cards — acknowledgement of a confirmed reception by the transmitting station.

Program material was supplied by the amateur, and included talks, recitations, readings from books and newspapers, and live or recorded music (in those days no copyright fees were payable). Broadcast times may have been for only a few hours a day and a few days a week.

=== Commercialization ===
In August 1923 laws were passed after an American model, as recommended by Ernest Fisk, by which "Sealed Set" receivers were built to receive a single frequency, that of the issuing company, whose income depended on sale or rental of these receivers, a situation analogous to Pay-TV services today. In the early days of the tuned radio-frequency receiver the simplicity of a "sealed set" would have been seen as a great convenience. Amateur constructors were however able to build tuneable (or "open") receivers and thereby gain a wider range of entertainment without fee.

This situation could not endure, and in mid-1924 "open" sets became legal, but subject to an annual "broadcast listener's licence", the fees of which would be apportioned to "A-class" broadcasters.

Among the six licences granted under the "sealed set" regime were several (5MA in Adelaide and 3FC in Melbourne) which were unable to adapt to the changes and failed commercially. Perhaps significantly, the transmitters of both stations mentioned were on long wavelengths (850 m. and 1720 m. respectively) unable to be picked up by ordinary medium-wave receivers. The others were granted "A-class" licences. 2FC was also on a long wavelength (1100 m) but converted to 442 metres.

As originally legislated, "A-class" broadcasters' licences were issued to broadcasters who undertook to:

- Install a transmitter of 5 kW power rating to a standard approved by, and on a frequency allocated by, the Postmaster General (PMG).
- Make a deposit of £1,000 with the PMG and organise a surety of a further £1,000 from an approved stakeholder
- Run regular programmes of general interest to the satisfaction of the PMG.
- The "A-class" broadcaster was permitted to run advertisements of no longer than five minutes duration and no more than 60 minutes in any 12-hour period.

The number of "A-class" stations in New South Wales and Victoria was limited to two each, and one to each of the other states. "B-class" stations were not encumbered by the same regulations. They received no part of the listeners' licences, but were permitted to fund their operations through advertising.

In 1925 a domestic broadcast listener's licence cost £1/15/-, of which the broadcasting station received £1/10/-. It did not entitle the holder to disseminate information or programmes (that required permission from the broadcaster), nor to amplify the audio for the benefit of customers, as in a barber shop or hotel. That required payment of a further £10/- fee. Radio dealers were prohibited from installing loudspeakers outside the shop's radio department.
Collections for the year 1924/25 amounted to around £114,000 which was apportioned:

2FC: £35,000 | 2BL: £12,000
3LO: £14,000 | 3AR: £4,000
6WF: £4,000; the balance being retained by the government.

By 1932 the fee had been reduced to £1/4/-.
The broadcast listener's licence in 1962 cost £2/15/- per annum, per household, and the Television Licence was £5 (£1/5/- for pensioners and blind people). It was a bothersome licence to renew, requiring a trip to a post office; difficult to enforce, as evasions could only be detected while a set was in use, and expensive to prosecute. In 1974 these licences were abolished by the reformist Whitlam government.

In the late 1920s amateurs were slowly displaced by professional organizations holding "A-class" or "B-class" licences, many of which were a continuation or development of an amateur operation. Amateurs were then obliged to pursue their hobby on higher frequency "amateur" bands.

=== National Broadcasting Service ===
The takeover by the Commonwealth Government of "A Class" broadcasters began in 1928 when the Australian Broadcasting Company (founded 1926 with a capital of £100,000) won a government contract to provide programming nationwide for the "A-class" stations in each State: 2FC Sydney and 3AR Melbourne in 1929, 4QG in Brisbane in 1930, 5CL in Adelaide 1929, and 6WF in Perth. The Postmaster-General's Department took over responsibility for provision, maintenance and operation of technical facilities of their studios and transmitters, giving the Government an ultimate veto over ABC broadcasts, a situation which would endure until the 1980s. Most of the commercial and ABC broadcast transmitters were manufactured and installed by either AWA or Standard Telephones and Cables with one or two by Scott and Co of Sydney.

The Australian Broadcasting Company became the Australian Broadcasting Commission in July 1932, with stations 2FC, 2BL, 2NC, 2CO, 3LO, 3AR, 4QG, 4RK, 5CL, 5CK, 6WP and 7ZL forming a national system with six capital city stations and four regional stations forming one network, and 2BL and 3LO the foundation of what would become a second network.

In October 1937 the roles of the two arms of the NBS were reversed in Sydney and Melbourne: 2BL took over the No 1 National programme from 2FC; 3AR from 3LO, and the newly commissioned 5AN from 5CL.

=== AM stereo ===
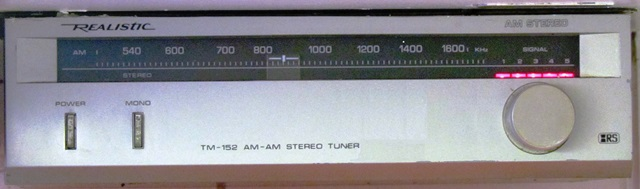
Realistic TM-152 AM stereo tuner; sold for $150 in 1988

In the late 1950s, before stereophonic record players became commonplace, and long before FM-stereo broadcasting, some stations (notably 3XY and 3UZ, but also 2CN and 2CY) partnered to present stereophonic programmes, one station to each channel, so the listener could set up a pair of radios and experience the stereo effect. The experiment ceased after a few months. In the mid-1980s some operators, including capital-city ABC stations, elected to have stereo modulation (to the Motorola C-QUAM standard) implemented on their transmitters. The system made no noticeable difference on standard radios, but was very effective on a compatible AM stereo receiver. Few of these (rather expensive) receivers were sold, and the networks abandoned the experiment without fanfare. As of March 2025, the only AM station still broadcasting in AM stereo is 4WK (963 kHz).

== Frequency assignment ==
By convention, a broadcaster's "spot on the dial" was originally defined in terms of wavelength (in metres), then from around 1940 increasingly by frequency, which was more precise, as all stations were by then crystal controlled to an accurate multiple of 5 kHz (or kilocycles per second in the terminology of the time).

A sufficiently accurate formula for converting wavelength to frequency is: f (in kHz) = 300,000 / λ (in metres)

In the early days the band was shared between "Class B" operators who operated on a defined wavelength and schedule, and licensed amateurs, who broadcast sporadically, and tried to transmit at a wavelength where risk of interference was minimized. In those days superheterodyne receivers were prohibitively expensive for most listeners; more common were crystal sets, regenerative or tuned radio frequency receivers, which had poor adjacent-channel rejection. Around 1930 a number of stations changed their operating frequencies, apparently independently and no doubt for good, though not published, reasons. A major program of frequency changes, imposed on broadcasters by the Post Master General, came into operation on 1 September 1935 following the licensing of another seven "B class" stations. Some were to standardize all frequencies to a multiple of 10 kcs/sec (10 kHz); some to resolve technical problems such as interference from nearby transmitters (in some cases from New Zealand), and a few in an effort to aggregate "A class" stations to the low-frequency (long wavelength) end of the dial, though there remained many exceptions to this policy.

Another reshuffle occurred in June 1948, when 24 stations were subjected to a changed frequency allocation. The reason given was increased power output of various New Zealand transmitters.

As a result of the Geneva Frequency Plan of 1975, on 23 November 1978 all broadcast stations moved to new frequencies on the basis of a 9 kHz "raster", thereby freeing up the crowded AM band by some ten percent. In the following decades many broadcasters moved to the FM band, trading long distance reception for less expensive transmission equipment and clearer sound. Most ABC AM stations continued to operate in the face of a burgeoning variety of competing media (FM, DAB+, podcasts ...) in the interests of universal coverage, but a great many commercial stations closed or turned to FM, and some transmitters were turned over to niche broadcasters (Radio for the Print Handicapped, ethnic radio, University radio, racing, News Radio). A later development was the provision of small AM repeater stations, both National and commercial, at a different frequency but bearing the same call sign as the primary transmitter.

This list does not include the many Australian Community radio Broadcasters except as they relate to National or Commercial broadcasters, and with a few exceptions ignores studios, programme material, personalities, networks, branding, slogans, and target audience.

Call sign	Location	Type	First b'cast	pre-1935		post-1935		c. 1950 kHz	pre- 1978 kHz	post- 1978 kHz	Current kHz / Fate	Notes
Call sign	Location	Type	First b'cast	λ (m)	kHz	λ (m)	kHz	c. 1950 kHz	pre- 1978 kHz	post- 1978 kHz	Current kHz / Fate	Notes
1RPH	Canberra	B	?								1125	Commenced ca 1995
1SBS	Canberra	B	2006								1440	Commenced ca March 2006 using former 2CN/2PB transmitter, initially with DRM30 trials
2AD	Armidale	B	1936			278	1080	1130	1130	1134	1134	
2AN	Armidale	A							0720	720		freq. change 760 to 720 kHz in 1976; Became 2RN Armidale
2AY	Albury	B	1930	203	1480	203	1480	1490		1494	1494	227 metres in 1930
2BA	Bega	A	1956						810	0810	0810	810 sits in both 10kHz & 9kHz rasters, therefore no change for GE75
2BE	Sydney	B	1924			204					C 1928	326 m. in 1926 442 m. 1926–1929; Australia's first commercial station.
2BE	Bega	B	1937			207	1450	1480	1480	0765	B	Callsign change to 2EC Bega
2BE	Moruya	B	1980s							0765	F	Callsign change to 2EC
2BE	Narooma	B	1980s							01584	B	Repeater for mush zone between synch Bega & Moruya. Callsign change to 2EC
2BH	Broken Hill	B	1934	221	1360	226	1330	0660		0567	0567	In 1948 moved to 650 kHz. Numerous frequency changes, perhaps the most of any Australian station.
2BL	Sydney	B	1925	353							B	Originally 2SB; Became National station with 2FC in 1932.
2BL	Sydney	A	1932	351	0855	405	0740	0740	740	0702	0702	Wavelength 353 m. 1925–1931.
2BS	Bathurst	B	1937			200	1500	1500	1500	1503	F 2018	Converted to FM Dec 2018
2BY	Byrock	A	1970s						660	657	0657	
2CA	Canberra	B	1931	286	1050	286	1050	1050	1050	1053	1053	Branding changed to 2JAB for one day on 28 Sept. 2021.
2CC	Canberra	B	1975						1210	1206	1206	
2CH	Sydney	B	1932	248	1210	252	1190	1170	1170	1170	D (22 Oct. 2020) C (10 June 2022)	1170 sits in both 10 kHz & 9 kHz rasters, therefore no change for GE75. 1170 kHz reallocated to 1170 SEN on 22 October 2020. DAB station closed on 10 June 2022.
2CK	Cessnock	B	1938			205.5	1460				C 1952	studio destroyed by fire in 1952, and not replaced; transmitter equipment at Neath unaffected but closed Became 2NM.
2CN	Canberra	A	1953					1540	1540	1440	0666	1440 sits in both 10 kHz & 9 kHz rasters, therefore no change for GE75. Moved to 666 in 1983; 1440 tx eventually used by 2PB.
2CO	Corowa	A	1931	536	0560	448	0670	0670	670	0675	0675	ABC Regional
2CP	Monaro (Cooma)	A	1966						1570	1602	1602	Originally a relay of 2CY.
2CR	Cumnock	A	1935	545	0550	545	0550	0550	0550	0549	0549	
2CS	Coffs Harbour	B	1980s				0	0		639	F	
2CY	Canberra	A	1938			353	0850	0850	850	846		Changed callsign to 2RN Oct 1990
2DU	Dubbo (Eulomogo	B	1936			283	1060	1250	1250	1251	1251	
2DU	Cobar	B	1984								0972	Repeater of 2DU Dubbo
2EA	Sydney	A								1386	1107	Allocated former 2UW frequency after 2UW converted to FM in early 1990s. SBS Radio
2EA	Wollongong	A									1035	SBS Radio
2EA	Wollongong	A									1485	SBS Radio
2EA	Newcastle	A									1413	SBS Radio
2EC	Bega	B									0765	Changed callsign from 2BE 1980s
2EC	Moruya	B									0765	Changed callsign from 2BE 1980s, converted to FM 1990s
2EC	Narooma	B								1584	1584	Changed callsign from 2BE 1980s, originally repeater to cover Bega / Moruya synch mush zone
2EL	Orange	B	after 1996								1089	was 2GZ
2EU	Sydney	B	1925									Callsign originally allocated but changed to 2UE prior to commencement
2FC	Sydney	B	1923	451	0665							was 1100 metres then 442 m. 1926–1929. Became ABC station 1932
2FC	Sydney	A	1932	451	0665	492	0610	0610	610	0576	0576	Renamed 2RN Sydney in October 1990
2GB	Sydney	B	1926	316	0950	345	0870	870	870	0873	0873	
2GF	Grafton	B	1933	246	1220	248	1210	1210	1210	1206	F 2022	Now operates on FM 89.5 MHz. It ceased broadcasting on 1206 kHz AM, on 23 Dec 2022, but still uses the call sign 2GF.
2GL	Glen Innes	A	c. 1954						820	0819	0819	
2GN	Goulburn	B	1931	216	1390	216	1390	1380	1380	1368	F 2022	201.3 m. in 1930; 1370 kHz after 1976?; changed callsign to 2GBN 7 Mar 2022. Closed May 2022, became GNFM on 107.7 MHz from 12 May 2022.
2GO	Gosford	B	1971						1310	1323	F 1991	801 kHz from 1986 to 1991.
2GZ	Orange	B	1935			303	0990		990	1089	B 1996	became 2EL after 1996
2HC	Coffs Harbour	B	1985								0639	
2HD	Newcastle	B	1925	270	1110	263	1140				C 1941	initially 333 metres then 288 m. 1925–1931 closed 1941 with 4AT, 5KA, 5AU during World War II following allegations of fifth column activities.
2HD	Newcastle	B	1945					1140	1140	1143	1143	reopened as ALP station
2HR	Singleton	B	1937			441	0680					became 2NX, Newcastle c. 1955
2JJ	Sydney	A	1975						1540	1539	F 1980	Originally an experimental ABC station which later obtained permanent status. Became 2JJJ (Later TripleJ) on 105.7 MHz in 1980.
2KA	Katoomba	B	1935			259	1160	0780	780	0783	C 1992	moved to 780 kHz in 1937. Wavelength was allocated 1935 for competitor 2KB but never implemented.
2KA	Penrith	B	1978					0	1480	01476	C ?	
2KM	Kempsey	A	1937	306	0980	306	0980	0980	530	531	B	Studios moved to Port Macquarie where it became 2MC in 1980. (Confusingly, the 2KM callsign was reused for a N.S.W. Labor Council owned (narrowcast?) station in Sydney on 1620 kHz, now 2MORO.)
2KO	Newcastle	B	1931	212	1415	213	1410		1410	1413	F 1990s	Converted to FM in 1990s and changed callsign to 2KKO
2KP	Kempsey	A	1954					0680	0680	0684	0684	
2KY	Sydney	B	1925	280	1070	294	1020	1020	1020	1017	1017	280 metres from 1925
2LF	Young	B	1938			224	1340		1340	1350	1350	linked with 2WG
2LG	Lithgow	A	1949					1370	1570	1485	1395	Using 1570 kHz in 1960.
2LM	Lismore	B	1936			333	0900	0900	900	900	0900	replaced 2XN
2LT	Lithgow	B	1939			278	1080	1390	1370	1395	0900	freq. 1370 kHz in 1976; 900 kHz from 1984
2LV	Inverell	B	1936			366	0820				B	linked with 2AD. Became 2NZ in 1937.
2MC	Port Macquarie (Kempsey)	B	1980								B	Former 2KM renamed 2MC when studios moved from Kempsey to Port Macquarie in 1980. 2MC converted to FM in 2000 but the 531 kHz AM frequency was taken over by 2PM
2MG	Mudgee	B	1938					1450	1450	1449	1449	
2MK	Bathurst	B	1925	260	1155						C 1931.	275 metres in 1925. MK = Mockler's Store
2ML	Murwillumbah; Terranora	A	1954							0720	0720	720 sits in both 10 kHz & 9 kHz rasters, therefore no change for GE75
2MO	Gunnedah	B	1931	227	1320	221	1360	1080		1080	1080	1080 sits in both 10 kHz & 9 kHz rasters, therefore no change for GE75
2MV	Moss Vale	B	1930	246	1220	208	1440	1440			C	205.4 m. in 1930, 241.8 in 1931. Closed c. 1931
2MW	Murwillumbah	B	1937			204	1470		1440	0972	0972	
2NA	Newcastle	A	1943					0820	1510	1512	1233	First ABC regional station.
2NB	Broken Hill	A	1948					0760		0999	0999	
2NC	Newcastle	A	1930	241	1245	244	1230	1230		1233	1233	
2NI	Norfolk Island	A	1952					0	1570	0 1566	01566	
2NM	Muswellbrook	B	c. 1955			205.5	1460	1460		1458	0981	replaced 2CK, moved to 981 in 1980
2NR	Grafton (Lawrence)	A	1936			429	0700	0700		0738	0738	
2NU	Tamworth (Manilla)	A	1948			455	0660	0650	0650	0648	0648	
2NX	Newcastle	B	c. 1955			221	1360	1360		1341	B	previously 2HR Singleton. Now on FM as hit106.9
2NZ	Inverell	B	1936			256	1170	1190	1190	1188	1188	previously 2LV; took over 2NZ licence issued for Narrabri in 1935 but not implemented. Linked with 2GZ
2OO	Wollongong	B	1979							1575	F 1992	Became i98FM
2PB	Canberra	A								1440	F 2006	ABC News Radio, converted to FM early 2006
2PB	Newcastle	A									1458	News Radio
2PB	Sydney	A									0630	News Radio
2PK	Parkes	B	1937					1400	1400	1400	1404	
2PM	Port Macquarie (Kempsey)	B	2000								0531	New 2PM took over frequency from former 2MC, when 2MC converted to FM. Now 'Radio 531'.
2PNN	Wollongong	A									1431	Radio National
2QN	Deniliquin	B	1935			208	1440	1520	1520	1521	1521	
2RE	Taree	B	1953			192	1560	1560	1560	1557	1557	2RE Taree ceased AM transmission on 19 July 2022, and transitioned to 88.9FM
2RG	Griffith	B	1936			204	1470	1070			0963	
2RN	Armidale	A									0720	Radio National (was 2AN)
2RN	Canberra	A									0846	Previous callsign 2CY, carries Radio National programmes
2RN	Goulburn	A								1098	F 2022	Radio National, now on 97.90 MHz. FM.
2RN	Newcastle	A									1512	Radio National
2RN	Nowra	A									0603	Radio National
2RN	Sydney	A									0576	Radio National (was 2FC)
2RN	Wilcannia	A									1485	Radio National
2SB	Sydney	B	1923								C 1924	allocated 450 m. in late 1923; became 2BL in 1924 It is likely this broadcaster never went to air.
2SM	Sydney	B	1931	236	1270	236	1270	1270	1270	1269	1269	
2ST	Nowra	B	1972								0999	
2TM	Tamworth	B	1935	201	1490	231	1300	1300	1300	1287	1287	204.5 m. in 1935
2TR	Taree	A						0720	0760	0756	0756	freq. change 720 to 760 in 1976
2UE	Sydney	B	1925	293	1025	316	0950	0950	0950	0954	0954	Originally 2EU, it was Australia's first commercial radio station, and broadcast on 293 metres from at least 1926.
2UH	Muswellbrook	A	1964						1040	1044	1044	
2UW	Sydney	B	1925	267	1125	270	1110	1110	1110	1107	F 1994	263 metres in 1926. Frequency given to SBS Radio (2EA Sydney). Now on FM as KIIS1065
2VM	Moree	B	1957						1530	1530	1530	1530 sits in both 10 kHz & 9 kHz rasters, therefore no change for GE75.
2WA	Wilcannia	A									1584	
2WG	Wagga Wagga	B	1932	260	1150	261	1150	1150	1150	1152	1152	303 metres in 1932? – Now part of the Triple M network
2WL	Wollongong	B	pre-1931	209	1435	210	1430	1430	1430	1314	F	Became WaveFM
2WN	Wollongong	A	1959						1580	1431	F 1991	Became 97.3 ABC Illawarra
2WO	Tamworth	B	1934									A 2WO Tamworth was announced in 1934 but never eventuated.
2WS	Sydney (Western Suburbs)	B	1978							1224	F 1993	Now on FM 101.7 as WSFM
2XL	Broken Hill	B	1931	220	1365						C 1932	
2XL	Cooma	B	1937			341	0880	0920	0920	0918	F 2019	Now XLFM.
2XN	Lismore	B	1930	224	1340	224	1340				C 1936	replaced by 2LM
2XT	Mobile station	B	1925	??							C 1927	operated from a New South Wales Government Railways train. XT = Experimental train
3AK	Melbourne (night service)	B	1931	200	1500	200	1500	1500		1503	1116	branded as "SEN 1116" Moved to 1116 in 2003 1503 was transferred to community station 3KND
3AR	Melbourne	B	1924									3AR moved to 480 metres then 484 1925–1931 then 492. Became ABC station 1932
3AR	Melbourne	A	c. 1928	492	0610	476	0630	0620	0620	0621	C	new (1935) wavelength 476 m.; moved to 517 a few months later By 1937 it had reverted to 484; unchanged 1949. Renamed 3RN Melbourne in October 1990
3AW	Melbourne	B	1932	210	1425	234	1280	1280	1280	1278	0693	relay to 3CV 1955
3BA	Ballarat	B	1930	231	1300	227	1320	1320	1320	1314	F 1998	call sign "Radiosport 927"
3BO	Bendigo	B	1931	309	0970	309	0970	0960		945	F	Now on FM 93.5 as Triple M
3BT	Ballarat	B								1314	1314	repeater of 3UZ
3CR	Melbourne	B	1976						840	837	855	Commenced as limited commercial, then public, now community
3CS	Colac	B	1939			265	1130	1130	1130	1134	1134	
3CV	Charlton; Central Vic.	B	1938								B	was 3MB; 1470 kHz (204 m.) by 1949
3CV	Maryborough; Central Vic.	B	1944					1440			F	was 3MB; 1470 kHz (204 m.) by 1949; 1440 kHz (208 m.) by 1953
3DB	Melbourne	B	1927	254	1180	291	1030	1030	1030	1026	F 1990	became 3TT in 1988 Now on FM as KIIS1011
3EA	Melbourne	A	1975						1120	1116	1224	SBS Radio; opened 9 June 1975
3EE	Melbourne	B	1992							693	1278	was 3XY Swapped frequency with 3AW in 2006 – Changed to "Magic 1278"
3EL	Maryborough	B	1935							1071	1071	
3GG	Warragul	B	1989							0531	0531	was 3UL
3GI	Longford	A	1935			361	0830	0830	0830	0828	0828	
3GL	Geelong	B	1930	214	1400	222	1350	1350	1350	1341	F 1990	Now on FM 95.5 as K-ROCK 1341 AM frequency no longer in English
3GV	Sale	B	2002								1242	was 3TR
3HA	Hamilton	B	1931	297	1010	297	1010	1000		0981	0981	
3HS	Horsham	B	1933			219	1370				C 1936	taken over by 3DB and closed 1936 in favor of 3LK
3KZ	Melbourne	B	1930	222	1350	254	1180	1180	1180	1179	F 1990	231 m. in 1930? Now on FM as Gold 104.3
3LK	Lubeck	B	1933? 1936?					1090	1090	1089	B 1977	became 3WM in 1977
3LO	Melbourne	B	1924	375	0800						B	371 m. 1926–1929
3LO	Melbourne	A	1928	375	0800	390	0770	0770	0770	0774	0774	371 m. 1926–1932 Relay to 2CO, 3GI, 3WL, 3WV in 1955
3MA	Mildura	B	1933			333	0900	1470	1470	1467	B	1360 kHz (221 m.) by 1949; 1470 kHz (204 m.) by 1953 later became 3ML.
3MB	Birchip	B	1936								C 1938	became 3CV
3ML	Mildura	B									1467	was 3MA
3MP	Rowville	B	1976						1380	1377	1377	
3MT	Omeo	A									0720	
3NE	Wangaratta	B	1954					1600	1600	1566	1566	
3PB	Melbourne	B										Opened in September 1925, and closed in January 1926, after only four months on air.
3PB	Melbourne	A									1026	News Radio
3RN	Albury-Wodonga	A									0990	Radio National
3RN	Melbourne	A									0621	Radio National
3RN	Wangaratta	A									0756	Radio National
3SH	Swan Hill	B	1931								1332	
3SR	Shepparton	B	1937			238	1260	1260	1260	1260	Original station, F 1988.	previous call sign 3WR. 1260 sits in both 10 kHz & 9 kHz rasters, therefore no change for GE75 Original station now on FM 95.3 as Triple M
3TR	Gippsland; Sale; Trafalgar; Traralgon	B	1930	234	1280	242	1240	1240	1240	1242	F 2002	became 3GV –
3UL	Warragul	B	1937			300	1000	0880		0531	B	became 3GG in 1989
3UZ	Melbourne	B	1925	322.5	0930	322.5	0930	0930	0930	0927	0927	319 m. in 1926; Now branded "Radio Sport National"
3WL	Warrnambool	A	1954			191	1570	1570		1602	1602	
3WM	Horsham	B	1977							1089	1089	was 3LK
3WR	Wangaratta	B	1925								C 1926?	303 m. in 1926
3WR	Wangaratta	B	1930	238	1260							reopened on 238 m. Moved to Shepparton 1935.
3WR	Shepparton	B	1935			238	1260					became 3SR in 1937
3WV	Horsham	B	c. 1936	322.5	0930						B	became A Class station 1937
3WV	Longford near Horsham	A	1937			517	0580			0594	0594	
3XY	Melbourne	B	1935			211	1420	1420	1420	1422	B 1992	became Magic 1278 1422 no longer in English
3YB	Mobile	B	1931	262	1145	248	1210					Broadcast for 4 hours per night for a three-week period from various Victorian towns which didn't radio permanent stations.
3YB	Warrnambool	B	1937			248	1210	1210		0882	0F 2018	Now on FM 94.5 882 now a relay of 3RPH 1179
3ZZ	Melbourne	A	1975						1220		C 1977	An experimental ABC station, broadcasting for only 2 years. Was Australia's first ethnic and community radio station.
4AA	Mackay	B									1026	Previous callsign 4MK
4AK	Oakey	B	1935			246	1220	1220		1242	1242	studio in Toowoomba
4AM	Mareeba	B	1967								0558	
4AM	Port Douglas	B									1422	Repeater of 4AM Atherton Mareeba
4AT	Atherton	B	1939	306	0980	441	0680				B 1941	closed by Federal government following allegations of fifth column activity. Became ABC a month later.
4AT	Atherton	A	1941			441	0680	0600		0720	0720	720 sits in both 10 kHz & 9 kHz rasters, therefore no change for GE75
4AY	Ayr	B	1934	306	0980	306	0980	0960			C c. 1970	Changed callsign to 4RR Jan 1987
HPON	Ayr	B	c. 1990							0873	0873	Uses On-air Identifier of 4AY
4BC	Brisbane	B	1930	262	1145	268	1120	1120	1120	1116	882	223 in 1930; 235 m. in 1930? 252 in 1933! Moved to 882 in 2021
4BH	Brisbane	B	1931	217	1380	217	1380	1390	0880	0882	1116	freq. moved 1390 to 880 in 1976 Moved to 1116 in 2021
4BK	Brisbane	B	1930	233	1290	233	1300	1300	1300	1296	F 1990	Now on FM 105.3 as B105
4BU	Bundaberg	B	1935			203	1480	1330	1330	1332	1332	
4CA	Cairns	B	1936			216	1390	1010		0846	0846	Complaints of interference from 4MB (both went from 1000 kHz to 1010 kHz) in 1948.
4CC	Biloela	B	1985						930	927	0666	Repeater of 4CC Gladstone, initially synch with 4CD Gladstone, shifted to 666 with power increase
4CC	Gladstone	B	1985								0927	was 4CD Gladstone
4CC	Rockhampton	B	1985								1584	was 4CD Rockhampton
4CD	Gladstone	B	1970								B	became 4CC Gladstone 1985
4CD	Rockhampton	B	1972								B	became 4CC Rockhampton 1985
4CH	Charleville	A	pre-1931	255	1175					0603	0603	
4FC	Maryborough / Hervey Bay	B	1992								1161	TAB Radio
4GC	Charters Towers	B	1976							0828	0828	
4GC	Hughenden	B									0765	repeater of 4GC Charters Towers
4GM	Gympie	A	1953					1570	1570	1566	1566	
4GR	Toowoomba	B	1925	300	1000	300	1000	0860	0860	0864	0864	294 metres in 1925, 1926
4GY	Gympie	B	1941			222	1350	1350		0558	0558	
4HI	Dysart	B									0945	
4HI	Emerald	B	1981								1143	
4HI	Moranbah / Nebo	B									1215	
4HU	Hughenden	A									1485	
4IP	Ipswich	B	1935			208	1440	1010	1010	1008	B 1992	became 4IO c. 1985, 4TAB in 1992
4JK	Julia Creek	A									0567	
4KQ	Brisbane	B	1947			461.5	0650	0690	0690	0693	0693	
4KZ	Ingham	B									1620	
4KZ	Innisfail	B	1967								0531	
4KZ	Karumba	B									1611	
4KZ	Tully	B									0693	
4LG	Longreach	B	1936					1100	1100	1098	1098	
4LM	Mount Isa	B	1961							0666	0666	
4LM	Cloncurry	B									0693	translator station
4MB	Maryborough	B	1932	283	1060	283	1060	1010	1160	1161	F	1160 kHz from 1953 Both 4CA and 4MB went from 1000 to 1010 in 1948. 1160 kHz in 1964; Became RadioTAB
4MI	Mount Isa	A	1986								1080	
4MK	Mackay	B	1931	252	1190	259	1160	1380		1026	1026	525 m. in 1930? 1390 in 1948
4MS	Mossman	A								0639	0639	
4NA	Nambour	B						0830	0828	0828	0	freq move 940 to 830 kHz in 1976. Became 4SS
4PB	Brisbane	A									0936	News Radio
4PM	Port Moresby	A				221	1360					repeater for, then replaced by, 9PA
4QA	Mackay	A	1951					0720		0756	0FM 1990s	Converted to FM 1990s
4QB	Pialba – Dundowran (Wide Bay)	A	1948			536	0560	0910		0855	0855	Synchronised with 4QO Eidsvold for both original 910 kHz operation and post 1978 current operation
4QD	Emerald	A									1548	
4QG	Brisbane	A	1925	395	0760	375	0800	0790			C	385 m. 1926–1929; Founded by (Labor) Queensland Government, became ABC station 1932. Renamed 4RN Brisbane in October 1990
4QL	Longreach	A	1947			435	0690	0540	0540	0540	0540	540 sits in both 10 kHz & 9 kHz rasters, therefore no change for GE75
4QN	Townsville (Clevedon)	A	1936			500	0600	0630	0630	0630	0630	630 sits in both 10 kHz & 9 kHz rasters, therefore no change for GE75
4QO	Eidsvold	A	1965							0855	0855	Synchronised with 4QB Pialba for both original 910 kHz operation and post 1978 current operation
4QR	Brisbane	A	1938			319	0940	0590		0612	0612	
4QS	Darling Downs; Dalby; Toowoomba	A						0750	0750	0747	0747	
4QW	Roma / St George	A									0711	
4QY	Cairns	A	1950					0940		0801	0801	
4RK	Rockhampton	A	1930	330	0910	330	0910	0840	0840	0837	0837	
4RN	Brisbane	A									0792	Radio National
4RN	Rockhampton	B	1926									B Class licence issued to Qld Gov, intended to be a repeater of 4QG but never implemented
4RO	Rockhampton	B	1932	225	1340	226	1330	1000		0990	0990	990 sits in both 10 kHz & 9 kHz rasters, therefore no change for GE75
4RR	Townsville	B	1987							0	0FM 1990s	Previous callsign 4AY
4SB	Kingaroy	B	1938					1060		1071	1071	call sign 1071AM
4SO	Southport	A	1952					1590	1590	1593	F 1989	
4SS	Nambour	B								0828	F 1990s	Previous callsign was 4NA
4TAB	Brisbane	B	1992								1008	was 4IP then 4IO c. 1985
4TI	Thursday Island (Torres Strait)	A								1062	1062	
4TO	Townsville	B	1931	256	1170	256	1170	0780	0780	0774	F 2005	Now on FM 102.3 as Triple M
4TOO	Townsville	B	2005	256	1170	256	1170	0780	0780	0774	C 2015	Former tech facilities of 4TO AM licensed as retransmission, following 4TO FM conversion ca 2005
4VL	Charleville	B	1936					0920	0920	0918	0918	
4VL	Cunnamulla	B									1584	
4WK	Toowoomba	B									1359	repeater of 4WK Warwick
4WK	Warwick	B	1935	333	0900	333	0900	0880		0963	0963	204.5 m. in 1935
4WP	Weipa	A								1044	1044	
4ZR	Roma / St George	B	1937					1480	1480	1476	1476	Has relays in St. George on 105.3 FM and Mitchel on 104.5 FM
5AA	Adelaide	B	1976					1390	1390	1386	1395	
5AB	Adelaide	B	1924								C 1924	340 m (880 kHz); poss. became 5CL
5AD	Adelaide	B	1930	229	1310	229	1310	1310		1323	F 1990	Now on FM as Mix 102.3
5AL	Alice Springs	A	1948			196	1530				B	became 8AL
5AN	Adelaide	A	1937			337	0890	0890	0890	0891	0891	
5AU	Port Augusta	B	1938			214	1400					closed with parent station 5KA 1941 after allegations of fifth column activity
5AU	Port Augusta	B	1943			214	1400			1044	1242	1450 kHz in 1976
5CC	Port Lincoln	B	1985							0765	0765	
5CK	Crystal Brook	A	1932	472	0635	469	0640	0640	0640	0639	0639	
5CL	Adelaide	B	1924								B	poss. succeeded 5AB. 420 metres or 375 metres then 395 m. from 1925 Became ABC station 1932.
5CL	Adelaide	A		411	0730	411	0730	0730	0730	0729	B	became 5RN Adelaide in October 1990
5CS	Port Pirie	B								1044	1044	associated with 5AA
5DN	Adelaide	B	1925	313	0960	313	0960			0972	1323	313 m. in 1926; 972 became 5PB News Radio
5DR	Darwin	A	1947					1500			B	Changed callsign to 8DR in 1960
5KA	Adelaide	B	1927	250	1200	250	1200				C 1941	closed 1941 with its repeater 5AU after allegations of fifth column activity
5KA	Adelaide	B	1943					1200	1200	1197	F 1990	Now on FM 104.7 as Triple M
5LC	Leigh Creek	A	1971							1602	1602	
5LN	Port Lincoln	A	1950					1530		1485	1485	
5MG	Mount Gambier	A	1955							1161?	1476	
5MU	Murray Bridge	B	1934			207	1450	1460		1125	1125	
5MV	Berri	A	1957					1590	1590	1593	1062	moved to 1305 in 1988; 1062 in 1996.
5PA	Penola	A	1956									moved to Naracoorte c. 1970
5PA	Naracoorte	A	c. 1970							1161	1161	
5PB	Adelaide	A									0972	News Radio. Was 5DN
5PI	Crystal Brook	B		288	1040	288	1040	1040	1040	1044		became 5CS in 1987.
5RM	Renmark	B	1935	319	0940	353	0850	0800	0800	0801	0801	
5RN	Adelaide	A									0729	Radio National. Was 5CL
5RN	Riverland (Berri)	A									1305	Radio National
5SE	Mount Gambier	B	1937			224	1340	1370		0963	0963	Now known as Triple M Limestone Coast
5SY	Streaky Bay	A	1977							0693	0693	
5UV	Adelaide	C	1970s						530	0531	0F 1990s	Initially licensed under WT Act, then Public, then Community, converted to FM 1990s
5WM	Woomera	A	1953					1580	1580	1584	1584	
6ABCRN	Christmas Island	A									1422	Radio National
6AL	Albany	A	1956								0630	
6AM	Northam	B	1934	275	1090	306	0980	0980		0864	0864	
6BAY	Geraldton	B									1512	
6BAY	Morawa	B									1512	repeater of 6BAY Geraldton
6BE	Broome	A	1990								0675	
6BR	Bridgetown	A									1044	
6BS	Bunbury (Busselton)	A									0684	
6BY	Bunbury	B	1933	306	0980	259	1160				C 1935	Call sign revived as 6BY Bridgetown
6BY	Bridgetown	B	1953						0900	0900	900	900 sits in both 10 kHz & 9 kHz rasters, therefore no change for GE75.
6CA	Carnarvon	A									0846	
6CI	Collie	B	1947					1340		1134	B	became 6TZ Collie
6DB	Derby	A									0873	
6DL	Dalwallinu	A									0531	
6ED	Esperance	A									0837	
6EL	Bunbury	B	2000								0621	
6EL	Margaret River	B	2000								01494	repeater of 6EL Bunbury
6FMS	Exmouth	B									0747	
6GE	Geraldton	B						1010	1010	1008	F 1991	
6GF	Kalgoorlie	A	1935			417	0720	0720	0720		0648	
6GL	Perth	B	1988								C 1991	1088 kHz; merged with 6IX
6GN	Geraldton	A						0830	0830	0828	0828	
6IX	Perth	B	1933	204	1470	242	1240	1240	1080	1080	1080	1130 in 1943 1080 sits in both 10 kHz & 9 kHz rasters, therefore no change for GE75.
6KA	Karratha	B	1978								1260	
6KG	Kalgoorlie	B	1931	246	1220	248	1210	1210			0981	246 m. in 1933
6KP	Karratha	A									0702	
6KW	Kununurra	A									0819	
6KY	Perth	B	1941			210	1430	1320	1206		F 1991	1430 kHz in 1941; 1320 in 1943 Now on FM as Mix 94.5
6LN	Carnarvon	B	1983								0666	
6MD	Merredin	B	1941					1100	1100	1098	1098	
6MJ	Manjimup	A									0738	
6ML	Perth	B	1930	297	1010	265	1130				C 1943	Commenced 31 Mar 1930 on 1010 kHz; 29 Jul 1931 changed to 1135 kHz (frequency selected by listeners from two choices offered by PMGD); 1 Sep 1935 changed to 1130 kHz; Closed 1943 ostensibly due to WW2 staff losses; 6IX subsequently allocated former 6ML frequency 1130 kHz
6MM	Mandurah	B	1988								1116	
6MN	Newman	A									0567	
6NA	Narrogin	B	1951					0920	0920	0918	0918	
6NM	Northam	A	c. 1954								1215	
6NW	Port Hedland	B	1977							1026	1026	
6PB	Bunbury (Busselton)	A									1152	News Radio.
6PB	Perth	A									0585	News Radio
6PH	Port Hedland	A									0603	
6PM	Perth	B	1937					1130	1000	0990	F 1990	1320 to 1240 kHz in 1943 990 sits in both 10 kHz & 9 kHz rasters, therefore no change for GE75. Now on FM 92.9 as Triple M
6PN	Pannawonica	A									0567	
6PR	Perth	B	1931	341	0880	341	0880	0880	0880	0882	0882	
6PU	Paraburdoo	A									0567	
6RN	Busselton	A									1296	Radio National
6RN	Dalwallinu	A									0612	Radio National
6RN	Perth	A									0810	Radio National
6RN	Wagin	A									1296	Radio National
6SAT	Paraburdoo	B									0765	
6SAT	Tom Price	B									0765	
6SE	Esperance	B	1982? 2000?							0747	0747	
6TP	Tom Price	A									0567	
6TZ	Bunbury	B	1939					0960	0960	0963	0963	
6TZ	Busselton	B	1995								0756	
6TZ	Collie	B									1134	was 6CI Collie
6VA	Albany	B	1956						780	783	0783	
6WA	Wagin (Minding)	A	1936					0560	0560	0558	0558	
6WB	Katanning	B	1936					1070	1070	1071	1071	
6WF	Perth (Wanneroo)	B	1924								B	1250 m. (240 kHz) in 1926; Became ABC station 1932
6WF	Perth (Wanneroo)	A	1929	435	0690	435	0690	0690	0690	0720	0720	moved to 690 kHz in 1929 with change of ownership. 720 sits in both 10 kHz & 9 kHz rasters, therefore no change for GE75.
6WH	Wyndham	A									1017	
6WN	Perth	A							0810			Became 6RN Perth in October 1990
6XM	Exmouth	A									1188	
7AD	Devonport	B	1932					0900	0900	0900	F 2019	Took over 7UV in 1940; 900 sits in both 10 kHz & 9 kHz rasters, therefore no change for GE75. converted to FM Mar 2019
7BU	Burnie	B	1935	221	1360	216	1390	0560	0560	0558	0F 2019	7BU was planned for 221m/1360kHz prior to 1 Sep 1935 restack, but did not commence till 19 Oct 1935; change from 216m/1390kHz to 455m/660kHz 8 Mar 1936; Converted to FM Mar 2019
7DY	Derby	B	1938					1450			B 1954	became 7SD, Scottsdale
7EX	Launceston	B	1938			300	1000	1000	1010	1008	F 2008	Converted to FM 2008 and changed callsign to 7EXX Now on FM 90.1 and 101.1 as Chilli FM
HPON	Launceston	H	2009?							1008	1008	TAB HPON, licence awarded after 7EX AM-FM conversion, uses old 7EX tech facilities
7FG	Fingal	A							1160	1161	1161	opened after 1976
7HO	Hobart	B	1930	337	0890	366	0820	0860	0860	0864	F 1990	349 metres in 1937. Became 7RPH Now on FM 101.7
7HT	Hobart	B	1936			278	1080	1080	1080	1080	F 1998	1080 sits in both 10 kHz & 9 kHz rasters, therefore no change for GE75
7LA	Launceston	B	1930	273	1100	273	1100	1100	1098	1098	F 1998	started as amateur station 7BN became TAB station Now on 89.3 & 100.3
7NT	Kelso near Launceston	A	1935	400	0750	400	0750	0710	0710	0711	F 2006	assertion 7NT founded 1928 could not be verified
7PB	Hobart	A									0747	News Radio
7QN	Queenstown	A	1954			556	0540	0540		0630	F 1991	630 sits in both 10 kHz & 9 kHz rasters, therefore no change for GE75
7QT	Queenstown	B						0720		0837		became 7XS in 1998
7RN	Hobart	B	1991									was 7ZL
7RPH	Hobart	B	1990								0864	was 7HO
7SD	Scottsdale	B	1954					1450		0540	0540	transferred from 7DY, Derby, 540 sits in both 10 kHz & 9 kHz rasters, therefore no change for GE75
7SH	St Helens	A							1570	1584	1584	opened after 1976
7UV	Ulverstone	B	1932	205.5	1460	205.5	1460				B	became 7AD Devonport in 1940
7XS	Queenstown	B	1937							0837	0837	took over 7QT in 1998
7ZL	Hobart	B	1926								B 1927	417 metres in 1926
7ZL	Hobart	A	1932	517	0580	508	0590	0600			C 1991	461 m. in 1937 http://trove.nla.gov.au/newspaper/article/25400495 became 7RN Hobart in October 1990
7ZR	Hobart	A	1938					0940			936	
8AL	Alice Springs	A	1960					1530	1380	0783	0783	began as 5AL on 1530 kHz; moved to 1380 kHz in 1976
8DR	Darwin	A	1960							0657	F 1989	previously 5DR on 1500 kHz
8DN	Darwin	B						1240	1240	1242	C 1992	
8GO	Nhulunbuy	A									0990	
8HA	Alice Springs	B	1971							0900	0900	
8JB	Jabiru	A								0747	0747	
8KN	Katherine	A								0639	F 1991	
8RN	Darwin	A									0657	
8RN	Katherine	A								0639	0639	
8RN	Tennant Creek	A								0684	0684	
8TC	Tennant Creek	A								0684	F 1991	
9PA	Port Moresby	A	1946					1250				Founded by Australian and United Staties Armies 1944. Replaced 4PM For other wartime call signs see below.

Legend
Type A = Government funded (including SBS radio). B = self funded (now called "commercial" but historic term retained here)
Fate Frequency if currently active, otherwise B = Broadcasts still occurring from same location and frequency but call sign changed; C = Licence cancelled or lapsed (may be followed by date); F = Moved to FM band (may be followed by date); D = Continues to broadcast using DAB+ only (may be followed by a date).

== Overseas broadcasters during World War II ==
A large number of AM radio stations were established by Australian and US forces in bases to the north of Australia in the years 1943–1946, of which around 20 were operated by the Australian Army Amenities Service. This is an incomplete list of those overseas broadcasters whose callsign commenced with "9". 9AT in Kure, Japan operated during the post-war occupation period.

Call sign	Base	Country	Frequency kHz	Opened	Closed	Notes
9A?	Weston	Borneo		1945		east of Labuan Island on Brunei Bay
9AA	Port Moresby	Papua New Guinea				This call sign used briefly, then reverted to 9PA
9AB	Lae	Papua New Guinea	1070/1340	!945		
9AC	Torokina	Papua New Guinea	1280	1945	1946	
9AD	Aitape	Papua New Guinea	1140/1180	1945		
9AD	Morotai	Dutch East Indies (Indonesia)	1180/1440			
9AE	Jacquinot	Papua New Guinea	1370/1425			
9AE	Rabaul	Papua New Guinea	1310/1370/1375/1425	1945		
9AF	Tarakan	Borneo		1945		
9AF	Labuan	Borneo	960/1340	1945		
9AG	Balikpapan	Borneo	960/1240/1340/1360			
9AJ	Bosley Field	Solomon Islands	960			
9AJ	Wewak	Papua New Guinea	960/980/1030	1945		
9AL	Rabaul	Papua New Guinea		1945		
9AL	Fauro Island	Solomon Islands	1030	1945		
9AO	Rabaul	Papua New Guinea	980			
9AO	Jesselton	Sabah	980	1946	1946	now Kota Kinabalu
9AP	Labuan	Borneo				
9AT	Kure	Japan	1470	1946		joint broadcast with US Army station WLKS
9PA	Port Moresby	Papua New Guinea	1250	1944	1946	for a time 9AA

== See also ==
- History of broadcasting in Australia
- List of radio stations in Australia
- Timeline of Australian radio
