= List of radio station callsigns in South Australia =

The following is a list of Australian radio station callsigns beginning with the number 5, indicating radio stations in the state of South Australia.

| Callsign | Area served | Frequency | Band | On-air ID | Purpose | Site |
|---|---|---|---|---|---|---|
| 5AA | Adelaide | 1395 | AM | FIVEaa | Commercial | |
| 5ABCFM | South Australia | various | FM | ABC Classic | National | |
| 5ABCRN | South Australia | various | FM | Radio National | National | |
| 5ABCRR | South Australia | various | FM | ABC Local Radio | National | |
| 5ACR | Remote Aboriginal communities | various | FM | National Indigenous Radio Service | Community | |
| 5ADD | Adelaide | 102.3 | FM | KIIS 102.3 | Commercial | |
| 5ADL | Adelaide | 091.9 | FM | Nova 91.9 | Commercial | |
| 5ALX | Goolwa | 096.3 | FM | Alex FM | Community | |
| 5AN | Adelaide | 0891 | AM | ABC Radio Adelaide | National | |
| 5AU | Port Augusta | 1242 | AM | 5AU | Commercial | |
| 5AUU | Spencer Gulf North | 105.9 | FM | Magic 105.9 | Commercial | |
| 5BBB | Barossa Valley | 089.1 | FM | Triple B | Community | |
| 5CC | Port Lincoln | 0765 | AM | 5CC | Commercial | |
| 5CCC | Port Lincoln | 089.9 | FM | Magic 89.9 | Commercial | |
| 5CCR | Ceduna | 094.5 | FM | CCR FM | Community | |
| 5CK | Port Pirie | 0639 | AM | ABC North & West SA | National | |
| 5CS | Port Pirie | 1044 | AM | 5CS | Commercial | |
| 5CST | Adelaide South West Suburbs | 088.7 | FM | Coast FM | Community | |
| 5DDD | Adelaide | 093.7 | FM | Three D Radio | Community | |
| 5DN | Adelaide | 1323 | AM | Gold 1323 | Commercial | |
| 5DUS | Coober Pedy | 104.5 | FM | Dusty Radio | Community | |
| 5EBI | Adelaide | 103.1 | FM | 5EBI | Community | |
| 5EFM | Victor Harbor | 089.3 | FM | Fleurieu FM | Community | |
| 5EZY | Murray Bridge | 098.7 | FM | Power FM | Commercial | |
| 5FBI | Adelaide | 092.7 | FM | Fresh 92.7 | Community | |
| 5GFM | Yorke Peninsula | 089.3 | FM | Gulf FM | Community | |
| 5GSFM | Victor Harbor | 090.1 | FM | Great Southern FM | Community | |
| 5GTR | Mount Gambier | 100.1 | FM | 5GTR | Community | |
| 5JJJ | South Australia | various | FM | Triple J | National | |
| 5KIX | Kangaroo Island | 090.7 | FM | Kix FM | Community | |
| 5LC | Leigh Creek | 1602 | AM | ABC North & West SA | National | |
| 5LCM | Mount Barker | 088.9 | FM | Lofty 88.9 | Community | |
| 5LFM | Riverland | 100.7 | FM | Riverland Life FM | Community | |
| 5LN | Port Lincoln | 1485 | AM | ABC Eyre Peninsula | National | |
| 5MBS | Adelaide Foothills | 099.9 | FM | 5MBS | Community | |
| 5CCJ | Adelaide Foothills | 088 | FM | Easy FM 88 | Narrowcast | |
| 5JAJ | Normanville | 087.6 | FM | Radio 876 | Narrowcast | |
| 5MG | Mount Gambier | 1476 | AM | ABC South East SA | National | |
| 5MMM | Adelaide | 104.7 | FM | Triple M Adelaide | Commercial | |
| 5MU | Murray Bridge | 1125 | AM | 5MU | Commercial | |
| 5MV | Riverland | 1062 | AM | ABC Riverland | National | |
| 5PA | Naracoorte | 1161 | AM | ABC South East SA | National | |
| 5PB | South Australia | various | AM | ABC NewsRadio | National | |
| 5PBA | Salisbury | 089.7 | FM | PBA-FM | Community | |
| 5PNN | South Australia | various | FM | ABC NewsRadio | National | |
| 5RAM | Adelaide | 107.9 | FM | 1079 Life | Community | |
| 5RCB | Mount Gambier | 104.9 | FM | Lime FM | Community | |
| 5RIV | Riverland | 093.1 | FM | Magic 93.1 | Commercial | |
| 5RM | Riverland | 0801 | AM | 5RM | Commercial | |
| 5RN | South Australia | various | AM | Radio National | National | |
| 5RRR | Woomera | 107.3 | FM | "Rocket Range Radio' and 'Armed Forces Radio Australia' since 1 July 2021. | Community | |
| 5ROX | Roxby Downs | 105.5 | FM | Rox FM | Community | |
| 5RPH | Adelaide | 1197 | AM | RPH Adelaide | Community | |
| 5SBSFM | Adelaide | 106.3 | FM | SBS Radio | National | |
| 5SE | Mount Gambier | 0963 | AM | 5SE | Commercial | |
| 5SEF | Mount Gambier | 096.1 | FM | SAFM 96.1 | Commercial | |
| 5SSA | Adelaide | 107.1 | FM | SAFM | Commercial | |
| 5SY | Streaky Bay | 0693 | AM | ABC Eyre Peninsula | National | |
| 5TCB | Bordertown | 106.1 | FM | 5TCB | Community | |
| 5THE | Millicent | 107.7 | FM | 5THE | Community | |
| 5TRX | Port Pirie | 105.1 | FM | Trax FM | Community | |
| 5UMA | Port Augusta | 089.1 | FM | Umeewarra Radio | Community | |
| 5UV | Adelaide | 101.5 | FM | Radio Adelaide | Community | |
| 5WM | Woomera | 1584 | AM | ABC North & West SA | National | |
| 5WOW | Port Adelaide | 100.5 | FM | WOW FM 100.5 | Community | |
| 5YYY | Whyalla | 107.7 | FM | Triple Y | Community | |

Despite having a callsign allocated to the Northern Territory, commercial station 8SAT is based in South Australia and most of its transmitters are located in the state.

== Defunct Callsigns ==
| Callsign | Area served | Frequency | Band | Fate | Freq currently | Purpose |
|---|---|---|---|---|---|---|
| 5AD | Adelaide | 1323 | AM | Swapped calls with 5DDN to become 5DN in 1994 | 5DN | Commercial |
| 5CL | Adelaide | 0729 | AM | Changed call to 5RN in 1991 | 5RN | National |
| 5DDN | Adelaide | 102.3 | FM | Swapped calls with 5AD to become 5ADD in 1994 | 5ADD | Commercial |
| 5DN | Adelaide | 0972 | AM | Moved to FM in 1990 as 5DDN (see also 5AD) | 5PB | Commercial |
| 5KA | Adelaide | 1197 | AM | Moved to FM in 1990 as 5KKA | 5RPH | Commercial |
| 5KKA | Adelaide | 104.7 | FM | Changed call to 5MMM in 1994 | 5MMM | Commercial |
| 5PI | Port Pirie | 1044 | AM | Changed call to 5CS in 1987 | 5CS | Commercial |
| 5UV | Adelaide | 0531 | AM | Moved to FM in 2001, retained call | Radio Italiana 531 (HPON) | Community |
