= Triple B =

Triple B may refer to:

- Triple B Sides, an EP by The Adicts
- 5BBB, a radio station branded as Triple B FM
- Big Baller Brand
- Triple B, an investment group run by the Bata family.

== See also ==
- BBB (disambiguation)
