= Bernard Cook =

Australian cricketer

Personal information
- Born: 15 March 1879; Torquay, Devon, England
- Died: 15 March 1944 (aged 65); Sherwood, Queensland, Australia
- Source: Cricinfo, 1 October 2020

Bernard Cook (15 March 1879 – 15 March 1944) was an Australian cricketer. He played in seven first-class matches for Queensland between 1909 and 1913. He also played bowls and won the Queensland singles championship in 1932 and metropolitan singles championship in 1940. He was also a radio commentator for ABC, 4AK, 4BC, 4BK, 4QG and 4MB. He was also a lieutenant in the 5th Queensland Infantry Brigade during the Second Boer War.

== See also ==
- List of Queensland first-class cricketers
