= SAFM =

SAFM or SAfm may refer to:

- SAFM (Adelaide), radio station in Adelaide, South Australia
- SAFM 96.1, radio station in Mount Gambier, South Australia
- SAfm (South Africa), radio station in South Africa
