= ABC South East =

ABC South East may refer to either of these two Australian Broadcasting Corporation radio stations:

- ABC South East NSW
- ABC South East SA
