= WLKS =

WLKS can refer to:

- WLKS-FM, a radio station (102.9 FM) licensed to West Liberty, Kentucky, United States
- WLKS (AM), a defunct radio station (1450 AM) formerly licensed to West Liberty, Kentucky, United States
