= ABC Eyre Peninsula =

Australia
- Broadcast area: Eyre Peninsula
- Frequencies: 1485 kHz AM (Eyre Peninsula); 693 kHz AM (West Coast)

Programming
- Format: Talk

Ownership
- Owner: Australian Broadcasting Corporation

History
- First air date: 1987

Technical information
- Transmitter coordinates: 34°43′11.61″S 135°51′26.08″E

Links
- Website: https://www.abc.net.au/eyre/

ABC Eyre Peninsula is an ABC Local Radio station based in Port Lincoln, South Australia. The station broadcasts to the Eyre Peninsula and western coastal region of South Australia, including the towns of Tumby Bay, Cummins, Ceduna and Streaky Bay.

== History ==
The station began broadcasting as 5LN in 1987 in a small office on 8 Eyre Street.

The first employee was Michael Astbury who was then joined by Peter Collins in 1990. Collins, while also acting as the rural reporter, also was responsible for putting to air a breakfast show. Soon Suzuy Grosser succeeded Collins as Rural Reporter who took over the realms of the program while also providing Eyre Peninsula and West Coast stories to The Country Hour. Paul Devonport then joined as a reporter, who was then succeeded by Tim Jeanes.

On air identification at this time was "5LN 1485". This changed to "1485 ABC Eyre Peninsula and West Coast" in 2002. A rebrand in 2019 saw the name scaled back to "ABC Eyre Peninsula". In 2005 due to various concerns the station moved to a new facility on Level 1 of the Civic Centre on 60 Tasman Terrace in the CBD.

== Local Programming ==
ABC Eyre Peninsula airs two local programs throughout the week.

- Eyre Peninsula Rural Report 6:15am to 6:30am – presented by Brooke Neindorf
- Breakfast 6:35am to 9:00am – presented by Emma Pedler

At all other times the station is a relay of either ABC North & West SA or ABC Radio Adelaide.

== Staff ==
As of 2021, there are a total of five full-time staff at ABC Eyre Peninsula.

== See also ==
- List of radio stations in Australia
