= Triple M Southwest =

Commercial radio station in Western Australia, Australia

Australia
- Broadcast area: South West, Western Australia
- Frequency: see transmitters

Programming
- Format: Adult contemporary
- Affiliations: Triple M

Ownership
- Owner: Southern Cross Austereo; (Radio West Broadcasters Pty Ltd / Elldale Pty Ltd)
- Sister stations: hit Southwest

History
- First air date: 2000

Links
- Website: triplem.com.au/southwest

Triple M Southwest is an adult contemporary-formatted commercial radio station, owned and operated by Southern Cross Austereo. Based in Bunbury, Western Australia, it covers the south west of the state via a number of high-powered AM stations. Previously part of the RadioWest network it was rebranded as Triple M in 2016.

== Presenters ==
=== Current ===
Local programming was produced and broadcast from Triple M's studios in Bunbury from 5:30am-7pm on weekdays, but as of 2025 - while repairs are being made to the radio studios after a fire - the Triple M breakfast show is being broadcast from studios in Busselton & Perth.

=== Former ===
- Noel Brunning (Seven News)
- Ian Blackley
- Darren de Mello (Coast FM Mandurah)
- Chris Ilsley
- Ashley Dillon
- Chris Parsons
- Vin Dawes
- Wayne Taylor
- Paul Cook (ABC Great Southern)
- Jamie McDonald
- Allan Aldworth
- Terry Siva
- Lynne Hayes

== Transmitters ==
Triple M South West is broadcast via four full power stations:

Call sign	Frequency	Broadcast area	ERP W	Transmitter coordinates	Notes
6BY	900 AM	Bridgetown	2,000	34°3′15″S 116°10′40″E	
6TZ	963 AM	Bunbury	2,000	33°20′24″S 115°45′10″E	
6TZ	1134 AM	Collie	2,000	33°22′13″S 116°11′35″E	Formerly 6CI
6TZ	756 AM	Margaret River	2,000	33°48′12″S 115°7′15″E	

In addition, the 4 full power stations feed a further 2 repeater stations.

Frequency	Broadcast area	ERP W	Transmitter coordinates
101.5 FM	Augusta	80	34°19′39″S 115°9′44″E
101.3 FM	Nannup	10	33°58′54″S 115°45′38″E
