= Radio Italiana 531 =

- Adelaide; Australia
- Frequency: 531 kHz

Programming
- Language: Italian

Technical information
- Transmitter coordinates: 34.8353°S 138.5744°E

Links
- Website: www.radioitaliana531.com.au

Radio Italiana 531 is one of Adelaide, Australia's two "on band" dedicated non-English language commercial radio services. Radio Italiana 531 broadcasts an Adelaide-based Italian language radio service.

The radio station was established in the 1990s, and commenced transmissions under an Australian Broadcasting Authority Temporary Community Broadcasting Licence (TCBL). The broadcasts on 92.9 FM were time shared with youth/dance community radio station Fresh FM, and in the licensing process both organisations applied for the full-time permanent FM broadcasting licence.

While Fresh FM was ultimately successful in gaining its licence and moving frequency to 92.7, this left the Italian Language station without a frequency. In the months following the grant of the FM community licence to Fresh FM, an additional AM licence became available. This licence was to be issued on a frequency which became available upon the previous licensee 5UV (Radio Adelaide) moving to an FM frequency.

531AM was auctioned by the Australian Broadcasting Authority for use as a narrowcast service, and the final and successful bid was won by Radio Televisione Italiana (SA) Inc, and the station is licensed as 5RTI.
