= ABC South West WA =

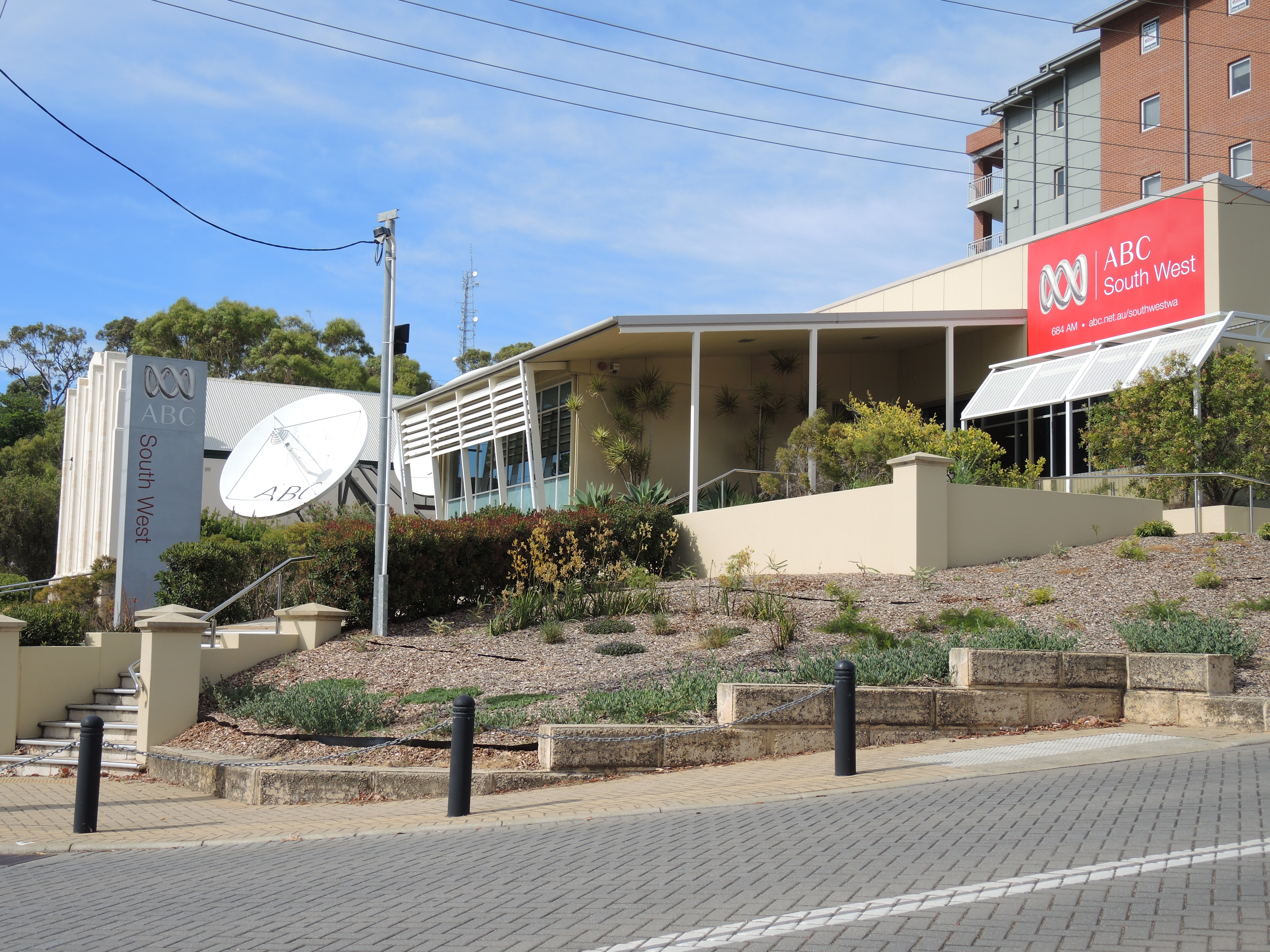
- Studio in Bunbury

Australia
- Broadcast area: South West
- Frequencies: 684 kHz AM; 1044 kHz AM; 738 kHz AM

Programming
- Format: Talk

Ownership
- Owner: Australian Broadcasting Corporation

Technical information
- Transmitter coordinates: 33°19′31.58″S 115°38′06.05″E

Links
- Website: www.abc.net.au/southwestwa/

ABC South West WA is an ABC Local Radio station based in Bunbury. The station broadcasts to the South West region of Western Australia. This includes the towns of Busselton, Bridgetown, Manjimup and Margaret River.

The station broadcasts through the following main AM transmitters, as well as some low power FM repeaters:

- 6BS 684 AM
- 6BR 1044 AM
- 6MJ 738 AM

When local programs are not broadcast the station is a relay of ABC South Coast and ABC Radio Perth.

== See also ==
- List of radio stations in Australia
