= 2BE (Sydney) =

Sydney, New South Wales, Australia; Australia
- Broadcast area: Sydney
- Frequencies: AM: 870 kHz; DAB+: Sydney

Programming
- Language: English

Ownership
- Owner: Rowley Bergin, Bergin Electric Company

History
- First air date: 7 November 1924
- Last air date: 6 November 1929
- Former frequencies: AM: 1180 kHz (1927–1935); 1030 kHz (1935–1978)
- Call sign meaning: Bergin Electric

2BE was Sydney's and Australia's first officially recognised commercial radio station, commencing broadcasting on 7 November 1924. It broadcast on the medium wave band at 870 kHz, with a power of 100 watts.

== Background ==
The station was owned and operated by the Burgin Electric Company, owned by Rowley Burgin, and 2BE was managed by Oswald Francis (Ossie) Mingay.

2BE held a Radio Dance Night on 23 December 1925, in aid of cancer research. On 3 March 1927 the station broadcast from the Radio and Electrical Exhibition at the Sydney Town Hall.

In 1927, 2BE was off the air for a few months on account of a fire.

The station only broadcast on two days per week, for at least the first two years. It closed exactly five years after opening, on 6 November 1929.

== After Closure ==
On 30 November 1937, the 2BE call-sign was re-allocated to 2BE Bega, New South Wales, which now broadcasts as 2EC.

2BE's 870 kHz wavelength was allocated to another Sydney station, 2GB.

== See also ==
- History of broadcasting
- History of broadcasting in Australia
- Oldest radio station
- Timeline of Australian radio
- List of Australian AM radio stations
