= 5BBB =

Radio station in South Australia

BBBfm
Australia
- Broadcast area: Barossa Valley, the Light District and Gawler
- Frequency: 89.1 MHz
- Branding: BBBfm

History
- First air date: 25 January 1997

Technical information
- Transmitter coordinates: 34.5733°S 139.0044°E

Links
- Website: bbbfm.com

BBBfm, branded as BBBfm, is a community radio station in the Barossa Valley, South Australia. Its studios are located in the Gladys Reusch Community Centre, and its transmitter on Kaiser Stuhl broadcasts the station to the Barossa Valley and surrounds, with its signal audible as far south as Adelaide. It broadcasts on a frequency of 89.1 MHz, although it launched on 91.9 and then moved to 101.5: both moves were to prevent interference with nearby broadcasters (ABRS and 5UV respectively).
