= ABC Western Queensland =

Australia
- Broadcast area: Central West Queensland, South West Queensland and some areas of the Gulf and other remote Queensland
- Frequencies: 540 kHz AM Longreach; 603 kHz AM Charleville

Programming
- Format: Talk

Ownership
- Owner: Australian Broadcasting Corporation

History
- First air date: 19 March 1947

Technical information
- Transmitter coordinates: 23°26′14.46″S 144°14′36.41″E

Links
- Website: https://www.abc.net.au/westqld/

ABC Western Queensland is an ABC Local Radio station based in Longreach broadcasting to the Central West, South West and Gulf regions of Queensland. It covers a wide area stretching as far as the towns of Charleville, Winton and Birdsville.

The station began broadcasting as 4QL in 1947 on 690 AM, originally as a relay of the national program. Studios were then built and local programs began in 1952. ABC Western Queensland now broadcasts through the following main AM transmitters along with a number of low-power FM repeaters:

- 4QL 540 AM - Longreach
- 4CH 603 AM - Charleville

During the late 1980s the NERR (North East Regional Radio) satellite service was established. This allowed 'black spots' to be filled in, supplementing the Longreach and Charleville transmitters. Program is fed via satellite to receivers in remote places like Birdsville or Karumba and then re-transmitted via a small FM transmitter to that town.

== See also ==
- List of radio stations in Australia
