= Fresh 92.7 =

Community radio station in Adelaide, South Australia

Coordinates: 34°55′19″S 138°36′32″E

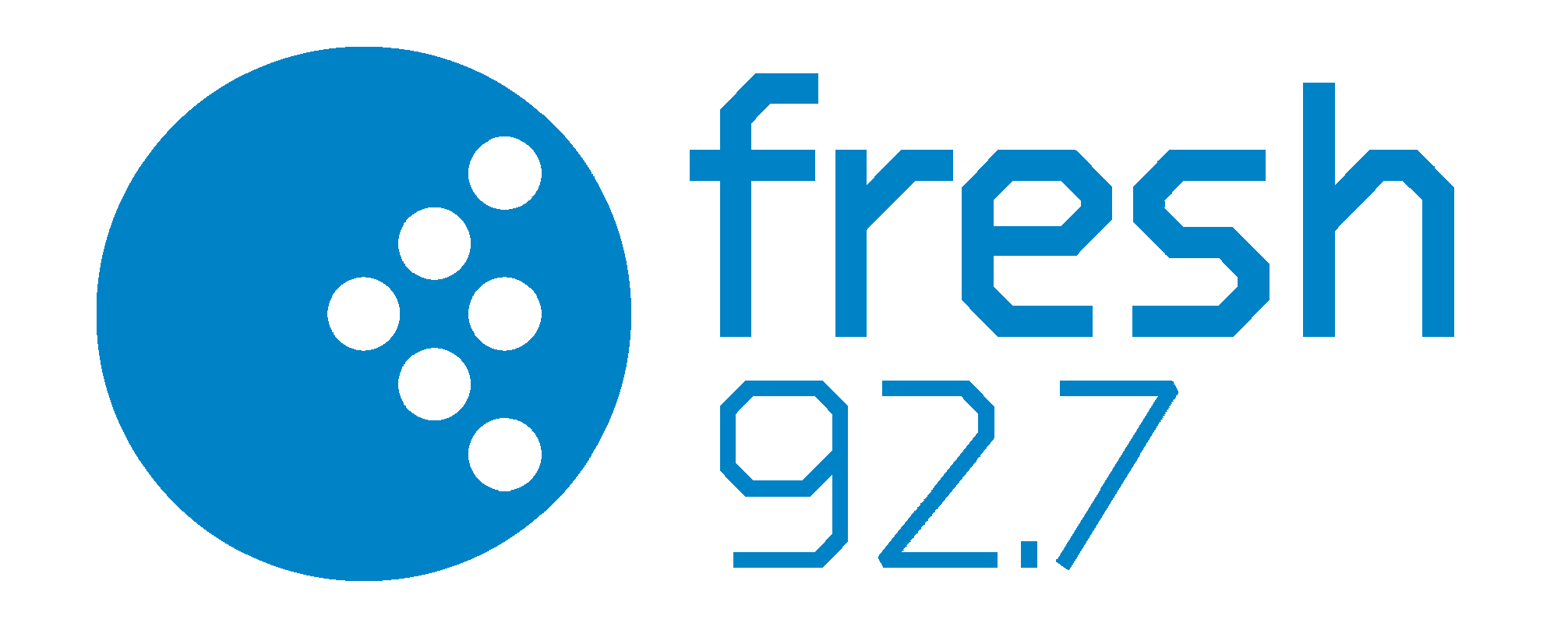

Adelaide, South Australia; Australia
- Broadcast area: Adelaide
- Frequency: 92.7 MHz

Programming
- Format: House, Rhythmic CHR

Ownership
- Owner: Community Based

History
- First air date: 17 March 1998

Links
- Website: fresh927.com.au

Fresh 92.7 (formerly Fresh FM) is a community radio station broadcasting in Adelaide, South Australia. The station can be accessed on 92.7 FM and DAB+ digital radio in Adelaide, iHeartRadio and the Fresh 92.7 App.

Fresh Broadcasters Incorporated is the name of the incorporated body under which Fresh 92.7 sits and 5FBI is their call sign.

Fresh is overseen by a volunteer board of between six and ten professionals, runs on 12 staff, and is supported by over 100 volunteers (known as members) in a range of capacities. It employs professionals with extensive radio experience to guide the volunteer team and to ensure the station complies with license obligations. Fresh 92.7 relies on client sponsorship; Fresh Mate subscribers; revenue from the EDM Production Course, merchandise sales, and their Book-a-DJ service; grant funding; and donations as sources of revenue.

== History ==
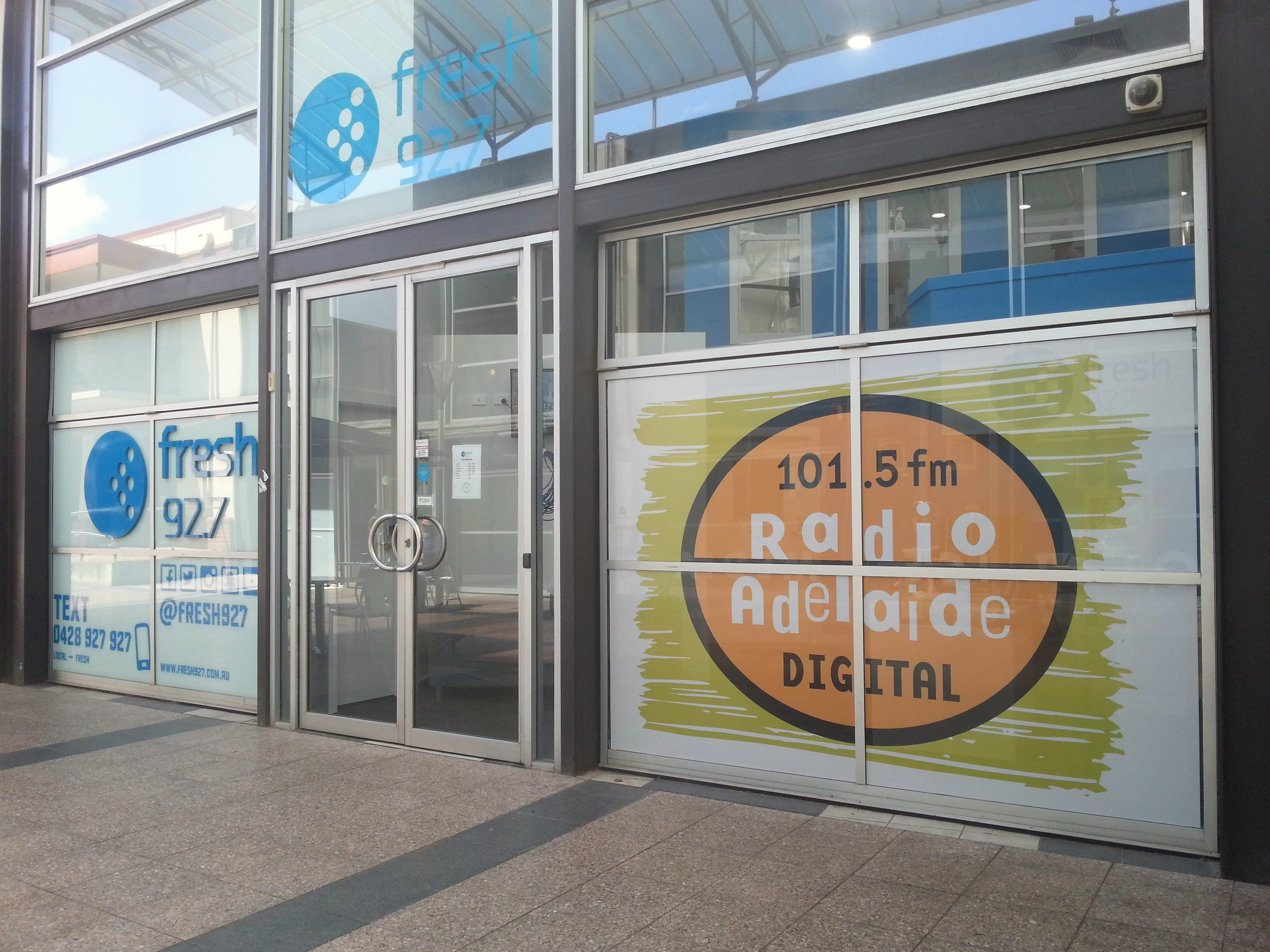
Radio Adelaide and Fresh FM in Cinema Place, East End, October 2016

Plans for Fresh 92.7 were laid when Chris Velliaris, James Engelman, and Geoff Wintle were visiting Melbourne in January 1997, and were exposed to Hitz FM, a youth radio station. They all agreed that Adelaide could benefit from a similar broadcasting concept. They formed a non-for-profit association and charter, and assembled a team of volunteers, including those with experience in various broadcasting professions.

Many of these volunteers had originally hosted specialist dance music shows on Coast FM 88.7.

Fresh commenced broadcasting with an Australian Broadcasting Authority "Temporary Community Broadcaster" licence on 17 March 1998. Initially the station broadcast at 92.9 MHz in a frequency-sharing agreement with the Italian language radio station Radio Televisione Italiana. They later moved to 92.7 MHz and on 22 August 2002, Fresh received a full-time broadcasting licence from the ABA. Then in October 2010, Fresh moved into new, state-of-the-art, digital studios in Adelaide's fashionable East End.

On 19 February 2016, the University of Adelaide's Vice-Chancellor Warren Bebbington announced that, in order to secure the future of Radio Adelaide as an independent not-for-profit organisation from July 2016, they had signed a deal with Fresh 92.7 that allowed Radio Adelaide to relocate and share their premises at 3 Cinema Place, off Rundle Street in the East End of Adelaide. The two organisations continued to operate as two separate entities, and neither station's programming was affected as part of the arrangement.

In December 2021, Radio Adelaide moved to new studios on Greenhill Road in Eastwood just outside the CBD.

== Top 92 ==
The Top 92 is an annual countdown of the most popular songs of the year, as voted by the listeners. It airs at the start of the year in January.

== Digital radio ==
In mid-2011, Fresh 92.7 commenced broadcasting digital transmission.

== See also ==
- List of radio stations in Australia
