= 4WK =

Coordinates: 27.5696°S 151.9566°E

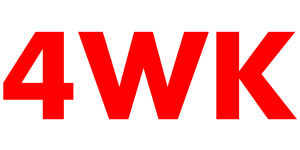
- Toowoomba, Queensland; Australia
- Broadcast area: Warwick, Toowoomba, Stanthorpe, Dalby
- Frequency: 963kHz C-QUAM AM Stereo

Programming
- Language: English
- Format: Hot adult contemporary

Ownership
- Owner: Broadcast Operations Group; (AMALGAMATED MARKETING PTY LTD)
- Sister stations: 4AK

History
- First air date: 28 June 1935; 91 years ago
- Call sign meaning: 4 = Queensland; W K Warwick

Technical information
- Power: 5 kW
- Translators: 95.5 Toowoomba; 91.5 Stanthorpe; 95.9 Dalby

Links
- Website: 4wk.com.au

4WK is an Australian commercial radio station located in Toowoomba, Queensland.

The station was first established in Warwick, Queensland in 1935, hence the callsign used for the station.

4WK currently broadcasts in the Toowoomba region on four separate frequencies. The station is heard on 95.5 FM in Toowoomba while the greater Darling Downs can receive the station on 963 AM. 4WK is also broadcast on 95.9 FM in Dalby and 91.5 FM in Stanthorpe.

The station is owned by Broadcast Operations Group and is part of the company's Super Radio Network. Previously, 4WK received syndicated talk shows from 2SM in Sydney including The John Laws Show. As of 2025, the station broadcasts a hot adult contemporary music format consisting of 80s to Now music, the talkback format now broadcast on 4AK after both 4WK and 4AK swapped formats.

During initial discussions in 1930 regarding a radio station at Warwick, it was originally mooted that 4WK would simply be a relay station for the Australian Broadcasting Company's National Broadcasting Service, but the plan never eventuated.

In 1932, there was doubt cast over whether 4WK would ever be established. However, a company called Warwick Broadcasting Proprietary Company Limited was eventually registered in 1934 for the purpose of establishing the radio station. 4WK was officially opened by Littleton Groom on 28 June 1935.

In the 1940s and 1950s, 4WK's programme schedule included recorded religious broadcasts from the United States, such as Music & the Spoken Word (Mormon Tabernacle Choir) and the Baltimore Gospel Tabernacle. Evening programmes included the Club Show with Jack Davey, Fred and Maggie Go Abroad, and relays of boxing matches.

On 14 July 2018 at 2130hrs, 4WK 963 kHz Allora commenced C-QUAM AM stereo transmission to complement its FM stereo translators.

On 19 March 2025, 4WK announced they will be switching to a Hot adult contemporary music format and 4AK will be switching to the News, Talk and Sport format beginning 24 March (Sunday night, 23 March at midnight).
