= SAFM 96.1 =

SAFM 96.1 (5SEF)
- Mount Gambier, South Australia; Australia
- Broadcast area: Mount Gambier RA1 ()
- Frequency: 96.1 MHz
- Branding: SAFM

Programming
- Language: English
- Format: Contemporary hit radio
- Affiliations: Hit Network

Ownership
- Owner: Southern Cross Austereo; (South Eastern Broadcasters Pty Ltd)
- Sister stations: 90.5 MHz FM Triple M Limestone Coast

History
- First air date: 16 May 1998
- Former names: FM 96.1 (1998–1999); 96.1 Star FM (1999–2012); Hit96.1 (2016–2020)

Technical information
- Licensing authority: ACMA
- ERP: 20 kW
- HAAT: 185 m
- Transmitter coordinates: 37°43′33″S 140°34′15″E

Links
- Public licence information: Profile
- Website: Official website

SAFM 96.1 (ACMA callsign: 5SEF) is an Australian commercial radio station based in Mount Gambier, South Australia, owned by Southern Cross Austereo. It commenced broadcasting on 16 May 1998 under the name FM 96.1.

The first breakfast host was Lyndon Smith who later moved to sister station 963 5SE (now Triple M Limestone Coast). The station changed its name to 96.1 Star FM in early 1999.

On 14 December 2016, Southern Cross Austereo rebranded Star FM, as all of their regional Hit Network affiliated stations changed to one centralised "Hit" brand. On 27 July 2020, the station was rebranded as SAFM, alongside its sister station in Adelaide formerly known as Hit107.

Programming is broadcast from Adelaide, Albury, Gold Coast and Townsville.
