= WLKS (AM) =

- West Liberty, Kentucky; United States
- Frequency: 1450 kHz

Ownership
- Owner: Morgan County Industries, Inc.

History
- First air date: July 25, 1965
- Last air date: April 11, 2017

Technical information
- Facility ID: 43786
- Class: C
- Power: 1,000 watts (unlimited)
- Transmitter coordinates: 37°55′36.00″N 83°16′41.00″W

WLKS (1450 AM) was a radio station broadcasting an oldies format. Established in 1965 and licensed to West Liberty, Kentucky, United States, the station was owned by Morgan County Industries, Inc. and featured programming from Westwood One. WLKS surrendered its license on April 11, 2017.
