= 4RN Brisbane =

4RN is the callsign for the Australian Broadcasting Corporation's Radio National station in Brisbane, Queensland. The station operates at a frequency of 792 kHz.

== General history ==
Radio broadcasting began in Brisbane in 1925 when the Government of Queensland commenced its own broadcasting operations with the callsign 4QG – 4 denoted the state of Queensland; QG stood for Queensland Government. 4QG became a part of the ABC's radio network at its inception in 1932.

The ABC started a second Brisbane station on 7 January 1938, using the callsign 4QR. The new station carried national programming—the forerunner of Radio National—while 4QG aired mainly local content. On 28 July 1963, the two stations quietly switched schedules, with 4QR becoming the local outlet for Brisbane while 4QG picked up the national schedule. 4QG now operates under the callsign 4RN, in common with all other Radio National services in Queensland.

== Technical history ==
=== Licensing ===
Radio 4QG commenced operation on 27 July 1925 and operated under an A class licence issued to the Queensland State Government of Queensland. 4QG was the only station of the era to be established by a state government, all other A and B class stations being owned and operated by private enterprise. The Queensland Radio Service was a unit within the Premier's Department which controlled all aspects of the operation of the station. In accordance with a Commonwealth Government decision, when the A class licence expired and was not renewed. The transmission and studio equipment was acquired by the Commonwealth at that time, while the transmitter site and studio premises were leased by the Commonwealth from the State Government. The transmission and studio facilities were then maintained and operated by the Postmaster-General's Department and programmes provided by a private enterprise consortium contracted for the purpose, the Australian Broadcasting Company. From 1 July 1932, the newly established Australian Broadcasting Commission (subsequently Australian Broadcasting Corporation from 1 July 1983) commenced to provide programming. A licence was issued for the second time in 1992 in accordance with the newly legislated Broadcasting Services Act.

=== Studios ===
At the time of initial commencement of service of the station, the temporary studios were located in the Executive Buildings in Brisbane City. When the "Big Transmitter" was commissioned early in 1926, the studios were co-located with the transmitter on the top floor of the then State Insurance Building. For many years (1950s to about 2000) the studios were located on Coronation Drive, Toowong.

=== Frequency ===
Initially it operated on a frequency of 779.2 kHz (formally a wavelength 385 metres). Circa 1929 the station changed frequency to 760.5 kHz (formally a wavelength 394.5 metres). From 30 June 1931, the Postmaster-General's Department adopted the international convention of expressing operation in terms of frequencies and the station was licensed for 760 kHz. On 1 September 1935, Radio 4QG changed frequency to 800 kHz to accord the new 10 kHz channel spacing plan for Australia. On 1 September 1948 the station changed frequency to 790 kHz to accord with a revised Australia / New Zealand 10 kHz channel spacing plan which involved many changes to Australian station frequencies, particularly those in Queensland and New South Wales. This frequency of 790 kHz remained unchanged for more than 30 years. Finally, on 24 November 1978 the frequency was changed to 792 kHz to accord with the 9 kHz channel spacing plan which had been agreed by Australia at Geneva in 1975 ("The 1975 Geneva Agreement").

=== Transmitter power ===
Station 4QG/4RN has seen several power increases since its commencement, both to increase its coverage area and to ameliorate increasing levels of man-made radio noise and night-time skywave interference levels. Initial operation was at about 170 Watts. Note that until about 1930, Australia identified transmitter power in terms of DC input to the final RF amplifier which is typically about 3 times greater than the power into the antenna. Thus the documentation of the day will invariably state 500 Watts. Early in 1926 the "big transmitter" was commissioned with a transmitter power of about 1700 Watts (DC input 5,000 Watts). Power was increased to 2.5 kW in 1932/1933 and again to 3.5 kW in 1946/1947. Power was increased to 10 kW in 1948/1949 and finally to 25 kW in mid 1990s.

=== Transmitter site ===
At the time of initial establishment Radio 4QG operated from the Executive Buildings in Brisbane City. The "big transmitter" was commissioned on the roof of the State Insurance Building in Brisbane City. For many years now Radio 4QG/4RN has shared (with Radio 4QR) a tall dual anti-fading guyed and sectionalised vertical radiator of 198 metres AGL with structural capacitative top hat located at Bald Hills on the northern outskirts of Brisbane. The mast is a very prominent feature visible from major highways in the vicinity. There is a shorter (81 metres AGL) vertical guyed radiator on the site which provides a standby capability during main antenna maintenance.
