= ABC Great Southern =

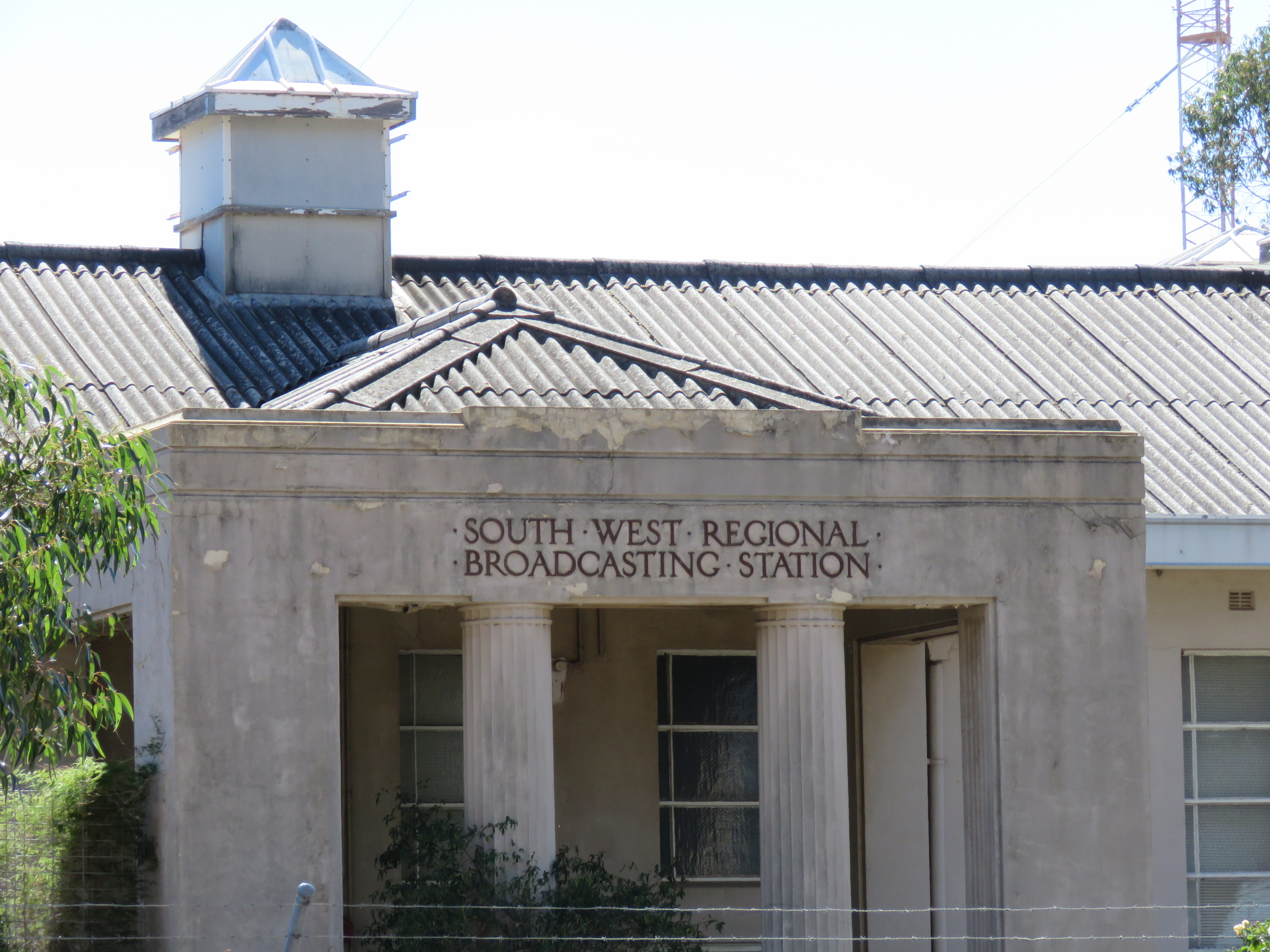
- The state heritage listed ABC Transmission Station in Minding in 2021
- Australia
- Broadcast area: Great Southern
- Frequency: 558 or 630 kHz AM

Programming
- Format: Talk

Ownership
- Owner: Australian Broadcasting Corporation

History
- First air date: 7 December 1936
- Former names: ABC South Coast

Technical information
- Power: 50kW (6WA); 5kW (6AL)
- Transmitter coordinates: 33°20′10.9″S 117°05′32.5″E

Links
- Website: https://www.abc.net.au/greatsouthern/

ABC Great Southern (formerly ABC South Coast) is an ABC Local Radio station based in Albany. The station broadcasts to the Great Southern and parts of the Wheatbelt regions of Western Australia. This includes the towns of Albany, Denmark, Katanning and Narrogin.

== History ==
The station was originally planned in 1930 as 6WA, in the midst of the Great Depression. It was the first transmitter of the ABC in South West WA, and was positively received by the local residents. It was fully constructed by 1935, and consisted of a control-amplifier, battery and transmitter rooms, as well as a workshop and an engine room to power the transmitter.

On 7 December 1936, an official opening function was held to celebrate the opening of the transmitter. A number of bands were played either in studio or via Perth, and an opening speech was relayed to the gala from Canberra. However, one of the bands' vehicles got into a crash and passengers had to be treated by ABC staff.

By the time regular transmission began, five people were on site ensuring 6WA went to air every day. In World War 2 staff were prevented from enrolling in the armed forces and had protection firearms on standby. The station even went as far as setting up a skeleton studio in a Wagin house so the ABC could continue to broadcast emergency information in the event that Perth was overtaken by Japanese forces.

In 1957 the transmitter upgraded its power to 50 kilowatts, and in 1961 mains power took over the diesel supplies, resulting in the diesel being removed and staff numbers slightly reduced as a result.

To celebrate the 50th anniversary of the station, a broadcast was made at the transmitter with a reunion of former staff. In 1994 plans were brought out to upgrade the station to an unmanned facility, but negotiations with the Shire Council stalled and did not eventuate. Another unmanned facility was eventually built, and in 2002 the original station was demolished and converted into a private residence.

In 2003, the ABC opened a new studio on 58 Tudhoe Street in Wagin to better broadcast to the Great Southern region. The studio consisted of a new office, studio, production area and also had the old gold safe retained from the building's Commonwealth Bank era. The only local program at this time was a two-hour breakfast program specifically for the Great Southern, presented by Shane Foley.

More presenters were added to the studio, and some even lived in the station's residence quarters in the back. However, in 2007, it was mothballed and only used by casual presenters for events like the Wagin Woolarama. Finally, in 2014, after drastic budget cuts, the ABC closed down the Wagin studio and transferred all activity to the studios in Albany. The building was thus sold in June 2016 to an unknown tendant for $200,000.

The station in Albany, ABC South Coast had its facade briefly renovated in that same year and was rebranded to ABC Great Southern, to "better reflect the region they cover" after the Wagin studio axe.

== Local Programming ==
ABC Great Southern airs three local programs throughout the week:

- Great Southern Rural Report 6:15am to 6:30am
- Breakfast 6:35am to 8:00am – presented by Paul Cook
- Mornings 10:00am to 11:00am – presented by Peter Barr
- Saturday Breakfast 6.00am to 9.00am - Angela Bristow-Baohm
- Regional WA Drive with Andrew Collins is broadcast from the ABC Great Southern studios in Albany. At all other times the station is a relay of ABC Perth.

== Staff ==
As of 2021, there are a total of twelve full-time staff and several casuals at ABC Great Southern.

== See also ==
- List of radio stations in Australia
- ABC South Coast
