= ABC South East SA =

Australia
- Broadcast area: Limestone Coast
- Frequencies: 1161 kHz AM South East SA; 1476 kHz AM Mount Gambier

Programming
- Format: Talk

Ownership
- Owner: Australian Broadcasting Corporation

History
- First air date: 8 September 1955

Technical information
- Transmitter coordinates: 37°49′29.58″S 140°46′55.89″E

Links
- Website: https://www.abc.net.au/southeastsa/

ABC South East SA is an ABC Local Radio station based in Mount Gambier, South Australia. The station broadcasts to the Limestone Coast region including the towns of Naracoorte, Millicent, Robe, Kingston, Bordertown and Keith.

== History ==
The station began broadcasting as 5MG in 1955, with a single transmitter which could only serve listeners in the Mount Gambier region. The first "broadcast" was on September 8 with a performance from the Mount Gambier Choral Society, broadcast from the Civic Hall.

In 1956, a second, better transmitter (5PA) was built 50 kilometres north of the town of Penola. This meant that more people could be reached in the region. The transmitter in the years to come was modified and relocated to the town of Nararcoote, which resulted in Mid and Upper South East residents being able to listen to 5MG.

The station's studios on 31 Penola Road were opened in the late 1950s, and were upgraded in 2006 to digital equipment, just a few years behind ABC Riverland.

== Local Programming ==
ABC South East carries three local programs throughout the week.

- Breakfast – 6:35am to 10:00am
- South East SA Rural Report – 6:15am to 6:30am
- Saturday Breakfast with Rod Sparks – 6:30am to 8:30am

When local programs are not broadcast the station is a relay of ABC Radio Adelaide.

== Staff ==
As of 2021, there are a total of ten full-time staff and several casuals at ABC South East SA.

== See also ==
- List of radio stations in Australia
