= ABC North and West SA =

- Australia
- Broadcast area: North and West South Australia
- Frequency: 639 kHz AM

Programming
- Format: Talk

Ownership
- Owner: Australian Broadcasting Corporation

History
- First air date: 15 March 1932

Technical information
- Transmitter coordinates: 33°11′25.50″S 138°00′31.79″E

Links
- Website: https://www.abc.net.au/northandwest/

ABC North and West SA is a local radio station based in Port Pirie, South Australia, owned by the Australian Broadcasting Corporation. Its callsign is 5CK and is transmitted on the AM band from high power transmitters situated near Crystal Brook.

== History ==
The 5CK transmitter station, located around 5 km from Crystal Brook on the Gladstone road, was officially opened on 15 March 1932 as a relay of 5CL Adelaide, the Australian Broadcasting Company's fourth regional station (after Rockhampton, Newcastle and Corowa). It was initially provided with a 6.25/7 kW STC transmitter, on a frequency of 635 kHz, and at 7.5 kW aerial power one of Australia's two most powerful broadcast stations, with 2CO in Corowa. In 1935 the station's frequency was regularized to 640 kHz, and in 1978 to 639 kHz, following the new standard 9 kHz spacing. The original antenna, suspended between two 56 m masts 80 m apart was in 1962 replaced with a guyed mast antenna 190 m in height.

From the outset programmes were fed to Crystal Brook from Adelaide by landline, mostly a "split" of the 5CL programme, but with occasional substitute material provided. From 1937 5CK's programme was mostly a "split" of 5CL's new sister station 5AN, with its greater emphasis on sport, current affairs and light entertainment. A differentiated programme for the regional network was to develop later. Locally produced programmes began in 1952 with the opening of ABC studios in Port Pirie.

The studios were originally a modest-sized house on Gertrude Road, which was within walking distance of the lead smelters.

In the 1970s, sweeping changes were made across ABC Radio. On 19 October 1970, transmitter staff were withdrawn, and the control of the transmitter was handed over to mechanized technology. With this major expansion and increasing of news production, the station began to outgrow its studios on Gertrude Street. Thus, in the late-1980s, the ABC commissioned the construction of $1.3 million dollar facility for the station, located at 85 Grey Terrace. The studios were completed in 1988, and were officially opened on October 20, 1988.

In 1989, technology for the station expanded even more with the establishment of a few satellite dishes to receive and send programs throughout the country. A 25 metre broadcasting tower was also erected.

In 1990 the station was also given an award for Services to Tourism. The manager Terry Price went to Coober Pedy to collect the prize.

== Local Programming ==
ABC North and West airs four local programs across the week.

- North and West Rural Report 6:15am to 6:30am – presented by Lucas Forbes
- Breakfast 6:35am to 10:00am – presented by Tom Mann
- Mornings 10:00am to 11:00am – presented by Angela Smallcombe
- Saturday Breakfast 6:00am to 9:00am – presented by Ian Harslett

These programs are also broadcast to ABC Eyre Peninsula when it isn't producing its own content. At all other times the station relays ABC Radio Adelaide.

== Staff ==
As of 2021, there are a total of ten full-time staff and several casuals at ABC North and West.
