= Radio Adelaide =

Radio Adelaide 101.5 FM (formerly 5UV)
Adelaide; Australia
- Broadcast area: Adelaide, South Australia
- Frequencies: 101.5 MHz FM, DAB+(digital radio)
- Branding: Radio Adelaide

Programming
- Languages: English, Mandarin, Japanese, Spanish, Polish, Farsi, Swahili, Persian, Bhutanese

History
- First air date: 28 June 1972

Links
- Website: Official website

Radio Adelaide (call sign: 5UV) is Australia's first community radio station. The signal reaches across the Adelaide metropolitan area to the Mid North, the Yorke Peninsula and Fleurieu Peninsula, the southern Barossa, Kangaroo Island, Riverland, and parts of the Eyre Peninsula broadcasting at 13 kilowatts on 101.5 MHz FM. The transmitter power was only 7 kW until an upgrade on 2 November 2006.

In 1972, 5UV was established, by the University of Adelaide, originally broadcasting at 531 AM, later moving to 101.5 FM, as Radio Adelaide, in 2002, and including digital radio, in 2011. Radio Adelaide has audio production facilities available including recording, mastering, duplication, online audio, digital transfer, message on hold, equipment hire and expert technical advice.

== Organisational structure ==
Radio Adelaide is highly autonomous despite technically being owned by the University of Adelaide until 2016, when the university sold the radio station premises and transferred the broadcast licence to Educational Broadcasters Adelaide Inc (EBA). The station is run by over five hundred volunteer station workers as well as a small amount of paid staff. Because Radio Adelaide is a community radio station, there are many program styles including comedy, music, etc. Because of this, Radio Adelaide uses strip programming to ensure some consistency and coherency. Programs on Radio Adelaide are provided by volunteers and also by access groups who pay for on air time. The largest purchaser of access time was "Student Radio" a collection of Radio Programs provided by university students from the University of Adelaide, Flinders University and the University of South Australia. After the introduction of Voluntary Student Unionism the hours which Student Radio broadcasts have been reduced, making the "Roundabout" program the largest purchaser of access time. Radio Adelaide collaborates with community radio stations 2SER Sydney and 4EB Brisbane to contribute content to the national current affairs radio programme The Wire by co-ordinating, resourcing and developing stories.

== History ==
In 1970, Kenneth Stirling, an accountant who worked for a mining company, anonymously donated $100,000 to the University of Adelaide to establish an educational community radio station. It was an idea being developed by key people at the university interested in broadening access to education, but it was also an innovative and creative leap, as there were not any such stations in Australia. Stirling died in 1973 and his anonymous donation became public. When 5UV opened in 1972, it had a special one-off licence, but the momentum for community access to broadcasting was happening nationally and it became a ‘public radio’ licence in 1974 along with a further 11 stations all in other Australian states. Stirling's donation gave 5UV Radio Adelaide a special place as the first station in Australia's very diverse community radio sector.

"On June 28th 1972, Radio VL-5UV began broadcasting, the first licensed community station to go to air in Australia....5UV was initially granted a frequency of 1630 kHz - part of the spectrum reserved for fixed and mobile services, licensed under the Wireless and Telegraphy Act, not the Broadcasting and Television Act."

In 1972, the newly created 5UV radio station began broadcasting in small rooms under the former Hughes Plaza, now the Hub Central, on the University of Adelaide campus. The University of Adelaide purchased the site on 228 North Terrace in the mid-1980s and Radio Adelaide's relocation was managed by its 1984 Station Manager Jill Lambert, with the new studios being built from 1988 and opened in April 1989.

The radio station 5UV was renamed Radio Adelaide in 2002 to coincide with its transfer from AM to FM band, following the ABA Licence Area Plans for Adelaide finding an available frequency on 101.5 FM.

In December 2003, following 18 months of planning and fundraising, Radio Adelaide launched its new antenna to take maximum advantage of its 101.5 FM frequency.

In 2014, the University of Adelaide's Vice-Chancellor Warren Bebbington announced changes to the funding model and location of Radio Adelaide to invest in other projects and its new Medical School.

=== 2016 ===
In June 2015, the University of Adelaide sold the station's studios at 228 North Terrace and the staff and volunteers were told to move by mid 2016.

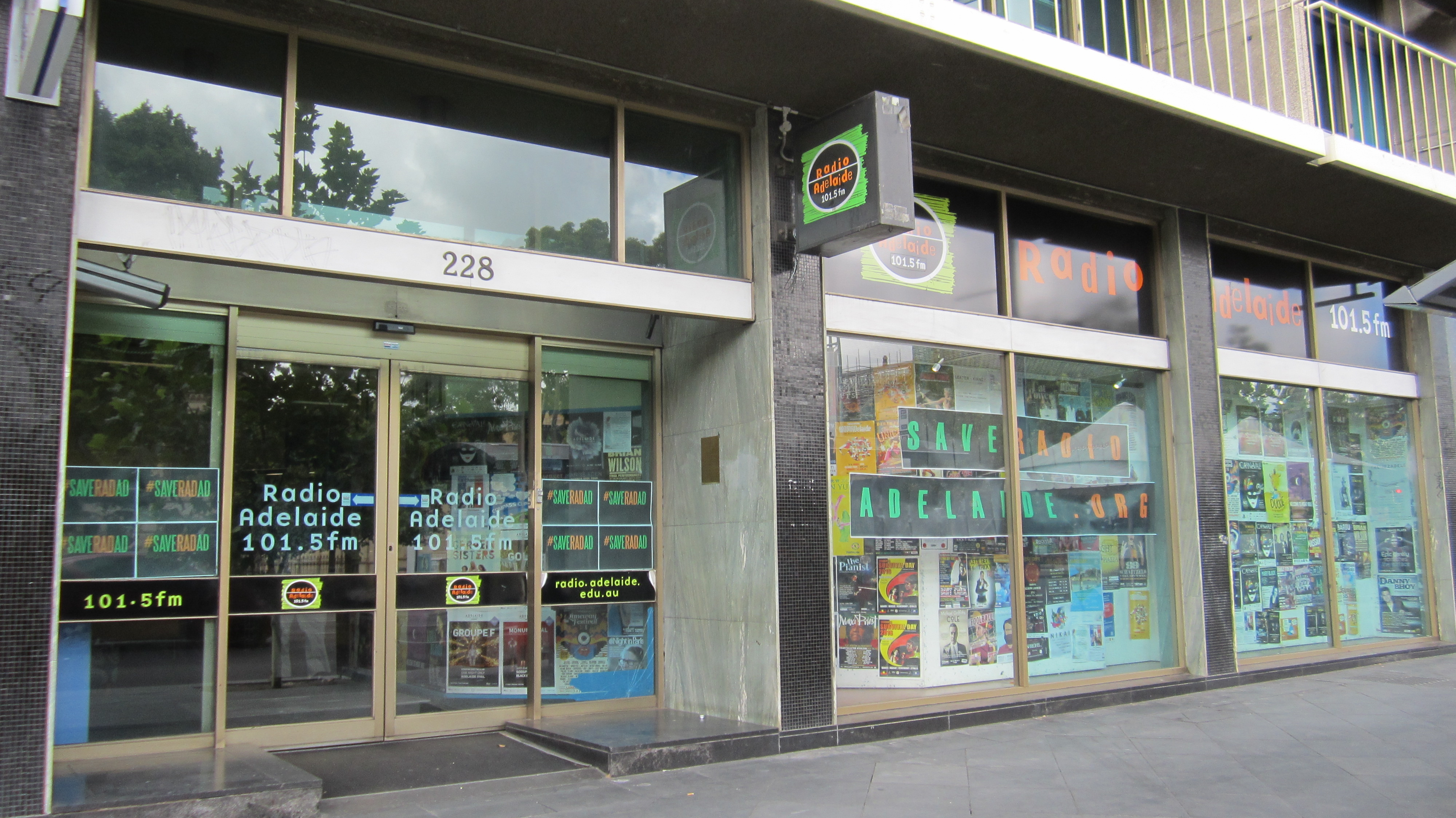
Radio Adelaide studios, 228 North Terrace, 31 January 2016

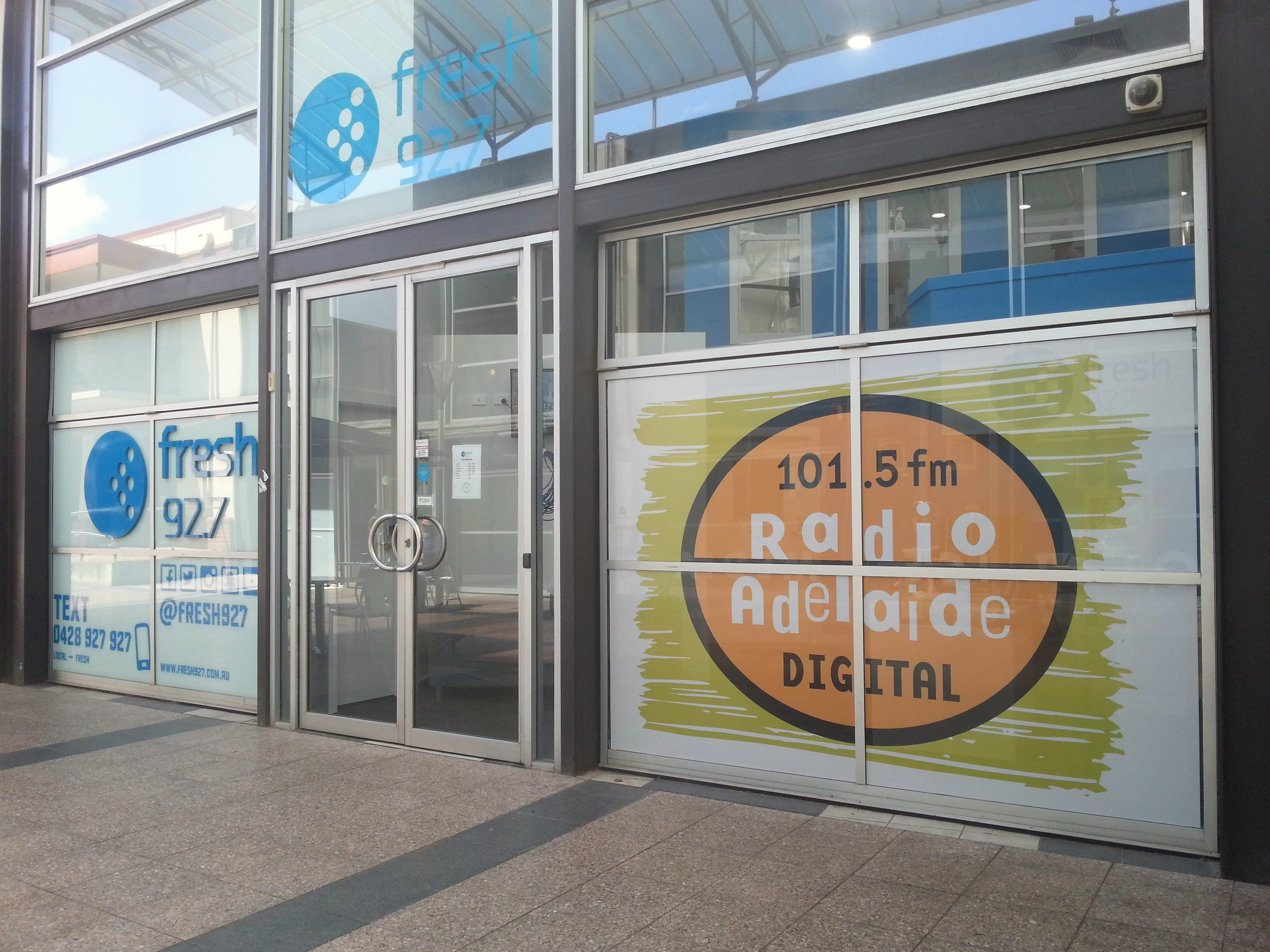
Radio Adelaide at studios shared with Fresh FM, East End, 24 October 2016

In December 2015, the University of Adelaide released a discussion paper to invite briefings from key stakeholders regarding the future of Radio Adelaide which included shutting down Radio Adelaide, ending 43 years of broadcasting and partnership with the University of Adelaide. Following the announcement that Radio Adelaide may face closure, the station's staff and volunteers began a grassroots campaign online and via social media to ensure the station's future. A week later, the University of Adelaide announced it will inform the station's staff and volunteers of Radio Adelaide's future in early January 2016 after the university released a Registration of Interest document seeking potential owners for Radio Adelaide, with a closing date of 24 December 2015. The University of Adelaide scheduled a meeting with the station's staff in late January 2016 but cancelled at the last minute citing "The assessment of short-listed bidders for Radio Adelaide is not yet complete."

On 18 February 2016, the University of Adelaide signed a deal with community radio station Fresh FM 92.7 to help operate and manage the station to become an independent not-for-profit organisation from July 2016. Under the new agreement with Fresh FM, Radio Adelaide will retain its educational mission and will initially co-locate with Fresh 92.7 in their Rundle Street Studios with a view to moving to new studios in the future. The transfer of the broadcasting licence from the university to a new entity cannot be finalised until approved by the broadcasting authority ACMA. It remains unclear how much of Radio Adelaide's current facilities and capacity will be retained in the shift, as Radio Adelaide's schedule tended to be eclectic with a mix of ethnically diverse programming, access groups, education and arts coverage.

In March 2016, a group of Radio Adelaide station workers and volunteers formed a body named RadAd Station Workers Association (RASWA) to represent the broader station community and to provide public comment on recent developments regarding the station's future due to a continued gag placed on paid station staff.

In May 2016, former Liberal MP Iain Evans was appointed the chairman of the new Radio Adelaide board. Other board members included lawyer Andrea Michaels, and station representatives Charlotte Bedford and Nikki Marcel. Radio Adelaide continued broadcasting during the transition to their temporary studios shared with Fresh 92.7, with automated programming for three weeks until Radio Adelaide's relaunch in late July 2016.

In June 2016, former television and radio sports broadcaster Rob Popplestone was appointed as Radio Adelaide's new general manager with Joanna Chronis joining the new Radio Adelaide board and station representatives Charlotte Bedford and Nikki Marcel stepping down. In July 2016, Popplestone announced the station's jazz and classical weekday morning programming would be axed and the new Radio Adelaide's launch postponed until early August due to delays in studio construction in Adelaide's East End. The RadAd Station Workers Association (RASWA) raised concerns about the announcement regarding the management's failure to comply with the station's licence obligations by not involving volunteers in the decision-making process. RASWA emphasised it is a legal obligation for community radio stations to encourage community access and participation in all aspects of station operations, from programming to management.

On 1 August 2016, Radio Adelaide returned to live broadcasting at the new studios shared with Fresh FM on 3 Cinema Place in Adelaide's East End.

On 1 December 2016, Radio Adelaide received short notice that 891 ABC Adelaide would be renamed "ABC Radio Adelaide" as part of the national broadcaster's rebranding strategy for all its radio stations in January 2017. Radio Adelaide's chairman Iain Evans accused the ABC of attempting to steal Radio Adelaide's name. Radio Adelaide's lawyer Andrea Michaels sent a legal notice to the ABC and submitted a trademark application to secure the stand-alone name 'Radio Adelaide' as the radio station already had claims to the name as a registered trademark and under common law. ABC local content manager Graeme Bennett argued there will be no confusion as the two radio stations have different audiences and it made sense to drop the frequency "891" from the branding as most people listen to digital radio that automatically tunes to the radio station.

On 14 December 2016, Radio Adelaide took the ABC to the federal court and sought a temporary injunction against the ABC in using the name "ABC Radio Adelaide" for 891 ABC Adelaide. On 19 December 2016, the broadcasting authority ACMA announced its approval of the transfer of Radio Adelaide's licence to Educational Broadcasters Adelaide Inc (EBA), and the University of Adelaide had 90 days to transfer the licence to EBA. The ACMA was satisfied with the written assurance from the University of Adelaide and the EBA to develop and provide a community consultation strategy and structured engagement programme to be implemented by 1 March 2017. In late December, the Federal Court granted Radio Adelaide a temporary injunction until April 2017 against ABC renaming 891 ABC Adelaide to ABC Radio Adelaide.

On 9 January 2017, 891 ABC Adelaide celebrated with its temporary new name ABC Adelaide as its interstate counterparts converted to ABC Radio Darwin, ABC Radio Brisbane etc.

In December 2021, Radio Adelaide moved its studios to 198 Greenhill Road, Eastwood, with the official opening taking place in September 2022.

== Adelaide University Student Radio ==
Adelaide University Student Radio
Adelaide; Australia
- Frequencies: 101.5 FM, DAB+ (digital radio), and online.

Programming
- Language: English

Ownership
- Owner: Adelaide University Union

Technical information
- Transmitter coordinates: 34°55′18″S 138°36′16″E

Links
- Website: www.auu.org.au/get-involved/student-radio/

Adelaide University Student Radio (AUSR) is an access group at Radio Adelaide and is funded by Adelaide University Union. It is the oldest student radio program in Australia, having been broadcasting since 1975. AUSR suffered severe funding cuts since the introduction of Voluntary Student Unionism legislation with weekly hours being cut from nine to three, before being increased to six and then seven in 2016. Local Noise, a live local band show, was the flagship of AUSR until 2007 when it was decided that funding was insufficient to maintain it and it was handed over to Radio Adelaide. Local Noise now broadcasts every weekday between 9 am and noon showcasing Adelaide bands, as well as Australian bands touring to Adelaide soon.

Adelaide University Student Radio previously aired Tuesday, Wednesday and Thursday nights from 11 pm-1 am, but as of 2016 broadcasts 6 pm – 1 am on Friday nights. The current student radio broadcast schedule can be found at the Radio Adelaide Website.

Student Radio is overseen by up to three Student Radio Directors, who must be members of the Adelaide University Union and are elected during the annual Union elections.

Student Radio Directors

2010 Casey Briggs and Chrissy Kavanagh
2011 Casey Briggs, Timothy Molineux and Sebastian Tonkin
2012 Timothy Molineux, Taherah Tahmasebi and Joel Parsons
2013 Kate Drinkwater, Bernard Evans and Luke Eygenraam
2014 Galen Cuthbertson and Jennifer Nguyen
2015 Matthew Bell, Wang Yang (part-year) and Isabella Xu (part-year)
2016 Sophie Atkinson and Rob Lawry

== Flinders University Student Radio ==
Flinders University Student Radio (FUSR) was broadcast on Radio Adelaide from 1997 to 2006, until funding was withdrawn following voluntary student unionism. FUSR was a 3-hour timeslot produced in a number of formats: comedy, variety, punk, metal, talkback, political discussion, sports, and even radio plays. All shows were solely hosted by students from Flinders University.

== Recognition ==
Radio Adelaide was a Registered Training Organisation providing nationally accredited training and in 1999, won Adult Learning Australia's Outstanding Training Provider of the Year Award.

Radio Adelaide has won the following awards for Broadcasting, Programming & Training:

- 1996 The Tony Staley Award - Best Innovative Use of New Media – for broadcasting on-line and World Wide Web
- 1996 The Annie Sprinkle Aphrodite Award – Red Light Radio
- 1988 PATER Award – Best Public Radio Station, Australian Academy of Broadcast Arts and Sciences
- 1985 PATER Award – Best Public Radio Station, Australian Academy of Broadcast Arts and Sciences
