= 2019–20 Australian bushfire season =

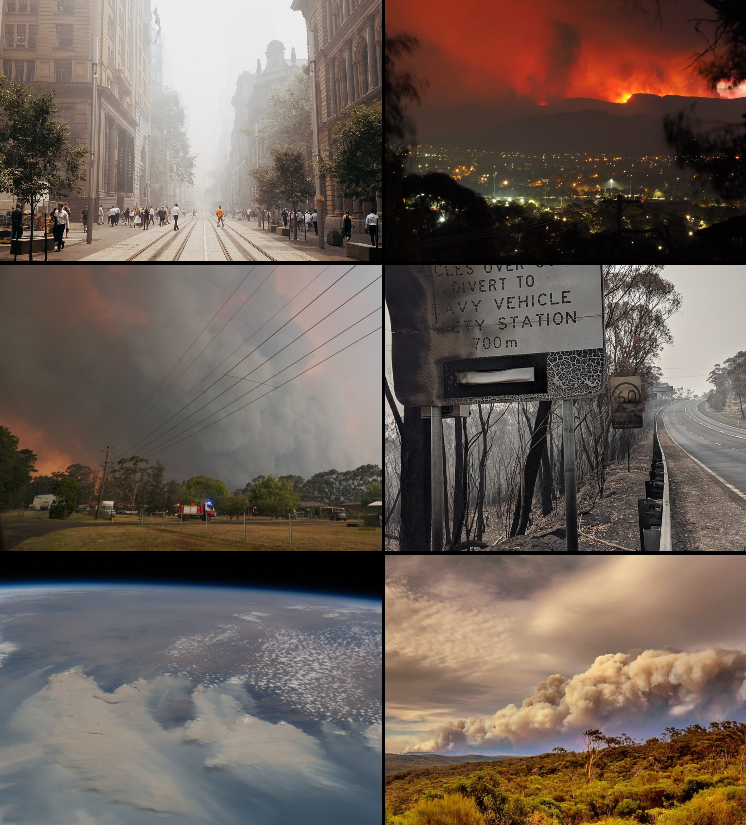
- Clockwise from top left: Sydney's George Street blanketed by smoke in December 2019; Orroral Valley fire seen from Tuggeranong; damaged road sign along Bells Line of Road; Gospers Mountain bushfire; smoke plume viewed from the International Space Station; uncontained bushfire in South West Sydney
- Date: June 2019 – 31 March 2020
- Location: Australia, mostly impacting the south-east coast in New South Wales and Victoria, and far-northern Queensland

Statistics
- Total fires: 11,774+
- Burned area: Approximately 24 million hectares (59 million acres; 240,000 square kilometres; 93,000 square miles)

Impacts
- Deaths: 33 (direct), 417 (indirect)
- Injuries: 4,000+
- Evacuated: 63,000+
- Livestock lost: Three billion animals displaced or killed (estimated)
- Structures destroyed: 3,000+
- Cost: $100 billion (estimated)

Ignition
- Cause: Climate change; Record-breaking heat; Drought; Lightning strikes; Positive Indian Ocean Dipole; Alleged arson; Accident

The 2019–20 Australian bushfire season, also known as the Black Summer, was one of the most intense and catastrophic fire seasons on record in Australia. Exceptionally dry conditions, a lack of soil moisture, and early fires in Central Queensland led to a premature start to the bushfire season from June 2019. Over ten thousand fires burnt, mainly in the south-east of the country, until March 2020. The most severe fires hit from December 2019 to January 2020.

The fires burnt more than 24 million hectares (59 million acres; 240,000 square kilometres; 93,000 square miles) destroyed over 3,000 buildings, and directly killed 33 people. Bushfire smoke was responsible for an additional 417 deaths. An estimated three billion terrestrial vertebrates, mostly reptiles, were killed or displaced. Some species may have been driven to extinction. In all affected states, air quality dropped to dangerous levels, and smoke moved across the Southern Ocean to impact weather conditions in other continents. Carbon emissions exceeded 700 million tonnes.

Rescue and recovery efforts were immense. States of emergency were declared across various regions of New South Wales (NSW) and the north-east to east of Victoria, which were the areas most impacted. NSW alone recorded 11,774 fires; six percent of the state burned. Methods of community damage control included total fire bans and strict evacuation orders. The Australian Defence Force was mobilised to provide manpower and logistical support, and international crews were brought in from New Zealand, Singapore, Canada and the United States. An air tanker, helicopters and fire trucks crashed in rescue efforts, resulting in the deaths of several crew members. The last major fire in Victoria was contained on 27 February 2020, and all fires in New South Wales were extinguished by 2 March.

The total economic loss was estimated at least $100 billion, far and away the costliest natural disaster in Australian history. Tourism sector revenues fell by $2.8 billion.

There was considerable debate regarding the underlying cause of the intensity and scale of the fires, including the role of fire management practices and climate change. The fires attracted significant international attention. An estimated $500 million was donated by the public, international organisations, public figures and celebrities for victim relief and wildlife recovery. Convoys of donated food, clothing and livestock feed were sent to affected areas.

== Overview ==
From September 2019 fires heavily impacted various regions of the state of New South Wales, such as the North Coast, Mid North Coast, the Hunter Region, the Hawkesbury and the Wollondilly in Sydney's far west, the Blue Mountains, Illawarra and the South Coast, Riverina and Snowy Mountains with more than 100 fires burnt across the state. In eastern and north-eastern Victoria large areas of forest burnt out of control for four weeks before the fires emerged from the forests in late December, taking lives, threatening many towns and isolating Corryong and Mallacoota. A state of disaster was declared for East Gippsland. Significant fires occurred in the Adelaide Hills and Kangaroo Island in South Australia. Moderately affected areas were south-eastern Queensland and areas of south-western Western Australia, with a few areas in Tasmania and the ACT being mildly impacted.

On 12 November 2019, catastrophic fire danger was declared in the Greater Sydney region for the first time since the introduction of this level in 2009 and a total fire ban was in place for seven regions of New South Wales, including Greater Sydney. The Illawarra and Greater Hunter areas also experienced catastrophic fire dangers, and so did other parts of the state, including the already fire ravaged parts of northern New South Wales. The political ramifications of the fire season have been significant. A decision by the New South Wales Government to cut funding to fire services based on budget estimates, as well as a holiday taken by Australian Prime Minister Scott Morrison, during a period in which two volunteer firefighters died, and his perceived apathy towards the situation, resulted in controversy.

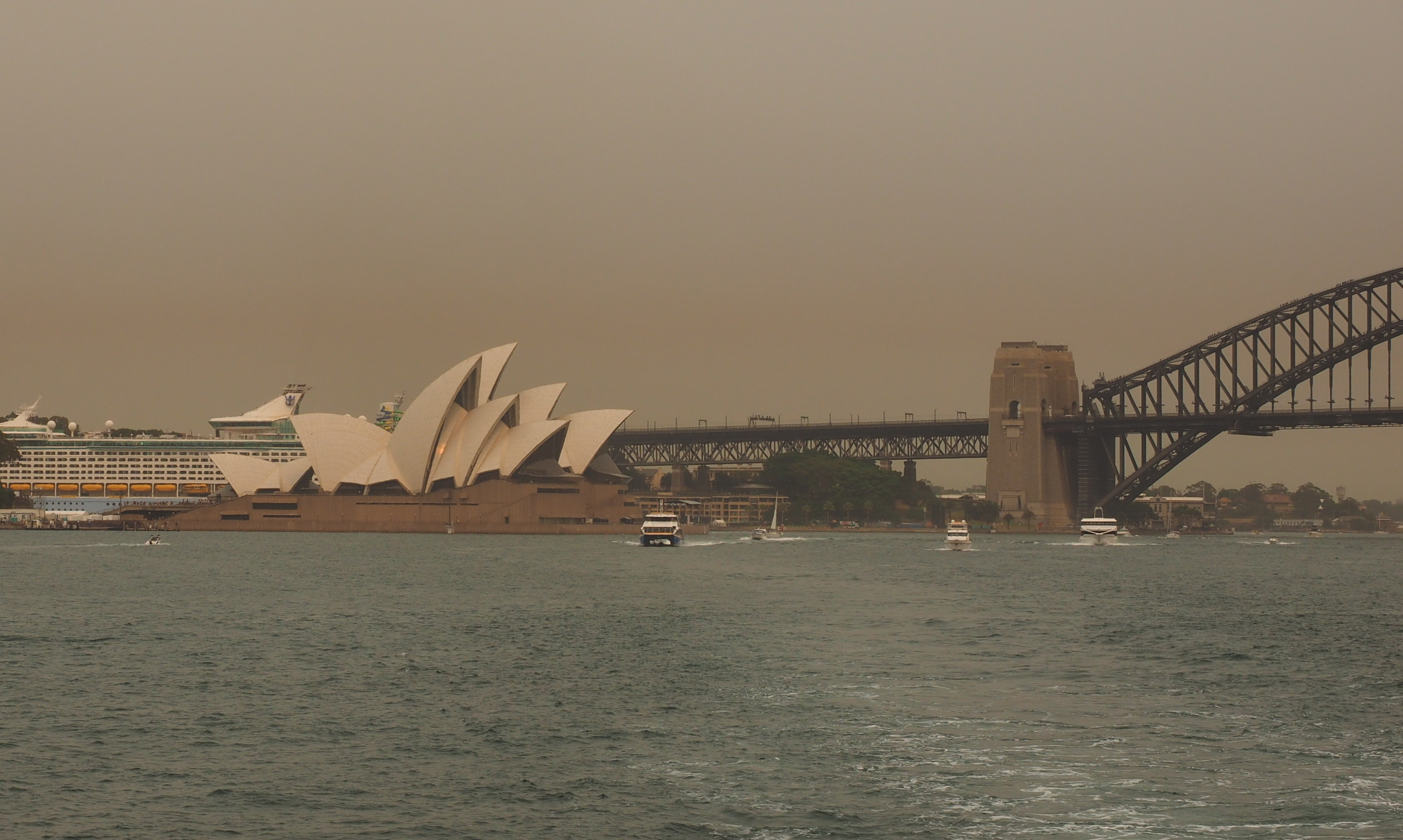
Bushfire smoke over the Sydney Opera House and Sydney Harbour Bridge on 29 December

As of 14 January 2020, 18.626 million hectares (46.03 million acres) was burnt or is burning across all Australian states and territories. Ecologists from the University of Sydney estimated 480 million mammals, birds, and reptiles were lost since September with concerns that entire species of plants and animals may have been wiped out by bushfire, later expanded to more than a billion.

Since the start of the season, the ongoing bushfires have destroyed 2,176 homes, as well as 48 facilities and more than 2,000 outbuildings in New South Wales alone. Twenty-five people were confirmed to have been killed in New South Wales since October. The latest fatality reported was on 23 January 2020 following the death of a man near Moruya.

In New South Wales, the fires burnt through more land than any other blazes in the past 25 years, in addition to being the state's worst bushfire season on record. NSW also experienced the longest continuously burning bushfire complex in Australia's history, having burnt more than 4 million hectares (9,900,000 acres), with 70-metre-high (230 ft) flames being reported. In comparison, the 2018 California wildfires consumed 800,000 hectares (2,000,000 acres) and the 2019 Amazon rainforest wildfires burnt 900,000 hectares (2,200,000 acres) of land.

Whereas these bushfires are regarded by the NSW Rural Fire Service as the worst bushfire season in memory for that state, the 1974 bushfires were nationally much larger (Note: Comparison to other fires in Australia: The 1974-75 bushfire season burnt over 100 million hectares (250 million acres), but there are different figures reported: In 1995, the Australian Bureau of Statistics reported 117 million hectares (290 million acres); The 2004 National Inquiry on Bushfire Mitigation and Management reported a total of 102 million hectares (250 million acres); The extent of the 1974-75 bushfire season was not known until after the event when satellite images were analysed, due to the fires being mostly located in very remote areas of the continent. The 1974-75 season affected mainly arid and grass lands. 2019-20 season has so far affected mainly forested land.: The Black Saturday bushfires in Victoria killed 173 people, injured 414, and destroyed 2,029 houses.) consuming 117 million hectares (290 million acres; 1,170,000 square kilometres; 450,000 square miles). However, due to their lower intensity and remote location, the 1974 fires caused around A$5 million (approximately A$36.5 million in 2020) in damages. In December 2019 the New South Wales Government declared a state of emergency after record-breaking temperatures and prolonged drought exacerbated the bushfires.

Due to safety concerns and significant public pressure, New Year's Eve fireworks displays were cancelled across New South Wales including highly popular events at Campbelltown, Liverpool, Parramatta, and across Sydney's Northern Beaches, and as well in the nation's capital of Canberra. As temperatures reached 49 °C (120 °F), the New South Wales Premier Gladys Berejiklian called a fresh seven-day state of emergency with effect from 9am on 3 January 2020.

On 23 January, a Lockheed C-130 Hercules air tanker crashed at Peak View near Cooma while waterbombing a blaze, resulting in the death of the three American crew members on board. It was one of eleven large air tankers brought to Australia for the fire season from Canada and US. An investigation is underway by the ATSB to determine the cause of the accident. Reaching the crash site proved difficult due to the active bushfires in the area. The crash site was located in dense bushland, and spanned approximately one kilometre.

State / territory	Fatalities	Homes lost	Area (estimated)		Notes
State / territory	Fatalities	Homes lost	ha	acres	Notes
Australian Capital Territory	1	0	10,494	25,930	Area; fatality (Note: NSW bushfire smoke blew into the ACT causing dangerous pollution, leading to one death)
New South Wales	25	2,176	5,200,000	12,800,000	Area; fatalities; homes
Northern Territory	0	5	6,800,000	16,800,000	Area, includes mainly scrub fires, which are within the normal range of area burnt by bushfires each year; homes
Queensland	0	48	2,500,000	6,180,000	Area, includes scrub fires; homes (Note: Some sources are reporting 48 homes lost in Queensland. Individual reports of Queensland home losses only amount to 45: Sarabah: 10, Stanthorpe: 7, Mareeba: 1; Ravensborne: 3, Peechey: 5, Cobraball : 15, Cooroibah: 1; Lowmead: 3)
South Australia	3	151	490,000	1,210,000	Area; fatalities; homes (KI:65) (AH:86)
Tasmania	0	2	36,000	89,000	Area; homes
Victoria	5	396	1,500,000	3,710,000	Area; fatalities; homes
Western Australia	0	1	2,200,000	5,440,000	Area, includes scrub fires; homes
Total	34	2,779	18,736,070	46,300,000	(Note: Compared to a country this would rank as the 87th largest, bigger than Syria.) Total area estimate as of 14 January 2020; current figure may be more

== Fire potential ==
The Garnaut Climate Change Review of 2008 stated:

Recent projections of fire weather (Lucas, et al., 2007) suggest that fire seasons will start earlier, end slightly later, and generally be more intense. This effect increases over time, but should be directly observable by 2020.

To describe emerging fire trends the study by Lucas and others defined two new fire weather categories, "very extreme" and "catastrophic".

The analysis by the Bushfire CRC, the Australian Bureau of Meteorology, and CSIRO Marine and Atmospheric Research found that the number of "very high" fire danger days generally increases 2-13% by 2020 for the low scenarios (global increase by 0.4 °C (0.72 °F)) and 10-30% for the high scenarios (global increase by 1.0 °C (1.8 °F)). The number of "extreme" fire danger days generally increases 5-25% by 2020 for the low scenarios and 15-65% for the high scenarios.

In April 2019 a group of former Australian fire services chiefs warned that Australia was not prepared for the upcoming fire season. They called on the next prime minister (Note: A Federal election was scheduled for May 2019.) to meet the former emergency service leaders "who will outline, unconstrained by their former employers, how climate change risks are rapidly escalating".

In August 2019 the federally funded Bushfire and Natural Hazards CRC published a seasonal outlook report which advised of "above normal fire potential" for southern and southeast Queensland, the east coast areas of New South Wales and Victoria, for parts of Western Australia and South Australia. In December 2019, the Bushfire and Natural Hazards CRC updated their advice of "above normal fire potential".

== Regions affected ==
Australian National University reported that the area burned in 2019–2020 was "well below average", pointing out that 30 million hectares less than the Australian annual average burned that year. More specifically, the early part of the season (2019) had "near average" burn area, whereas the area burned in the late part of the season (2020) was "unusually low".

=== New South Wales ===
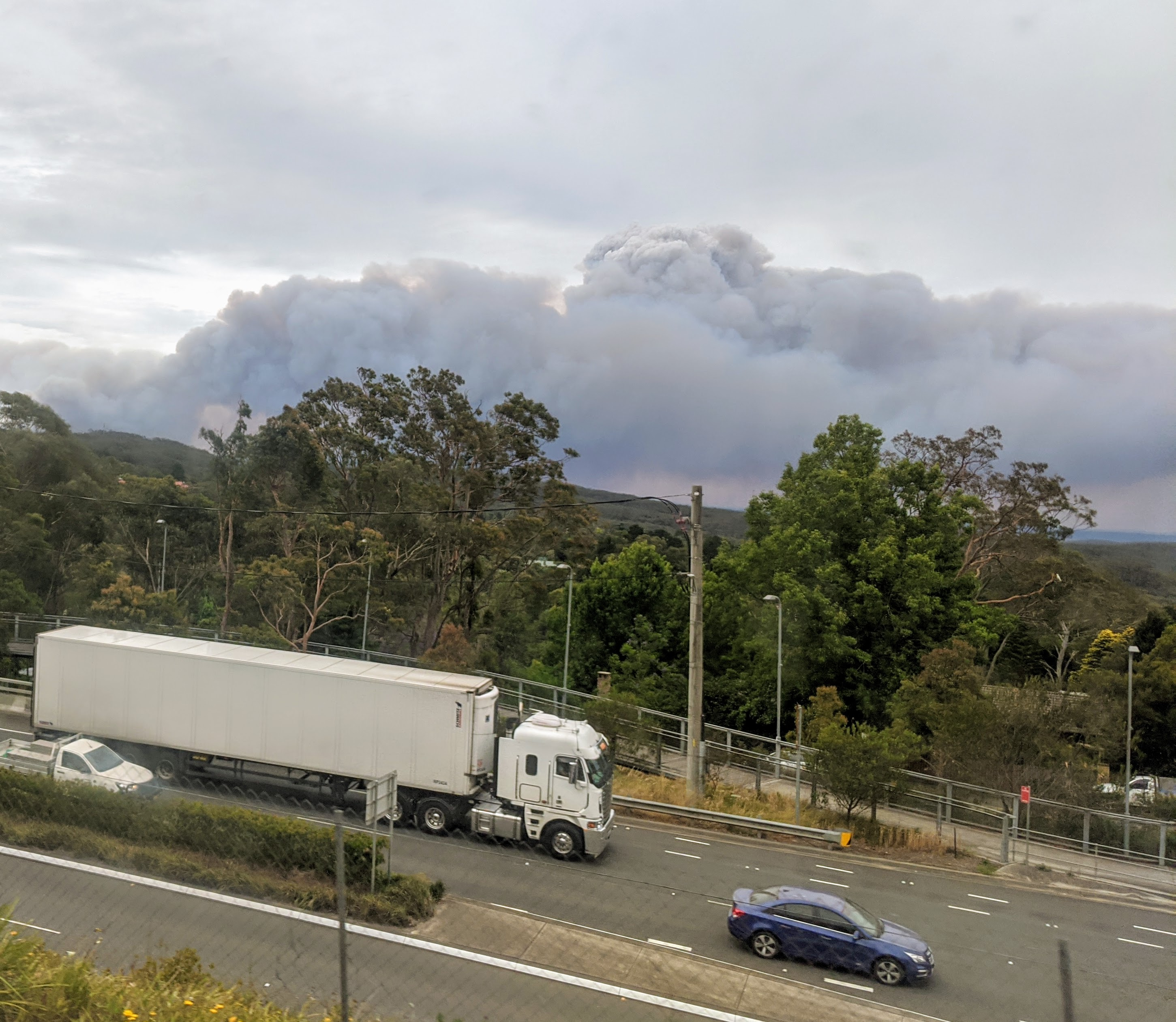
Gospers Mountain fire taken from a Blue Mountains line train in December 2019

The NSW statutory Bush Fire Danger Period normally begins on 1 October and continues through until 31 March. In 2019–20, the fire season started early with drought affecting 95 percent of the state and persistent dry and warm conditions across the state. Twelve local government areas started the Bush Fire Danger Period two months early, on 1 August 2019, and nine more started on 17 August 2019.

==== North Coast ====
On 6 September, the northern parts of the state experienced extreme fire dangers. Fires included the Long Gully Road fire near Drake which burnt until the end of October, killing two people and destroying 43 homes; the Mount McKenzie Road fire which burnt across the southern outskirts of Tenterfield, and severely injured one person, destroyed one home and badly damaged four homes; and the Bees Nest fire near Ebor which burnt until 12 November and destroyed seven homes.

==== Mid North Coast ====
At the Port Macquarie suburb of Crestwood a fire started on 26 October from a dry electrical storm. Water bombers were delayed the following day in attempts to bring the fire burning in swampland to the south west of Port Macquarie under control. A back burn on 28 October got away from New South Wales Rural Fire Service (NSWRFS) volunteers after a sudden wind change pushing the fire south towards Lake Cathie and west over Lake Innes. Port Macquarie and surrounding areas were blanketed in thick smoke on 29 October with ongoing fire activity over the following week caused the sky to have an orange glow. During this time the Lindfield Park fire burning in dry peat swamp flared up and threatened homes at Sovereign Hills and crossed the Pacific Highway at Sancrox. These fires burnt 4,500 hectares (11,120 acres).

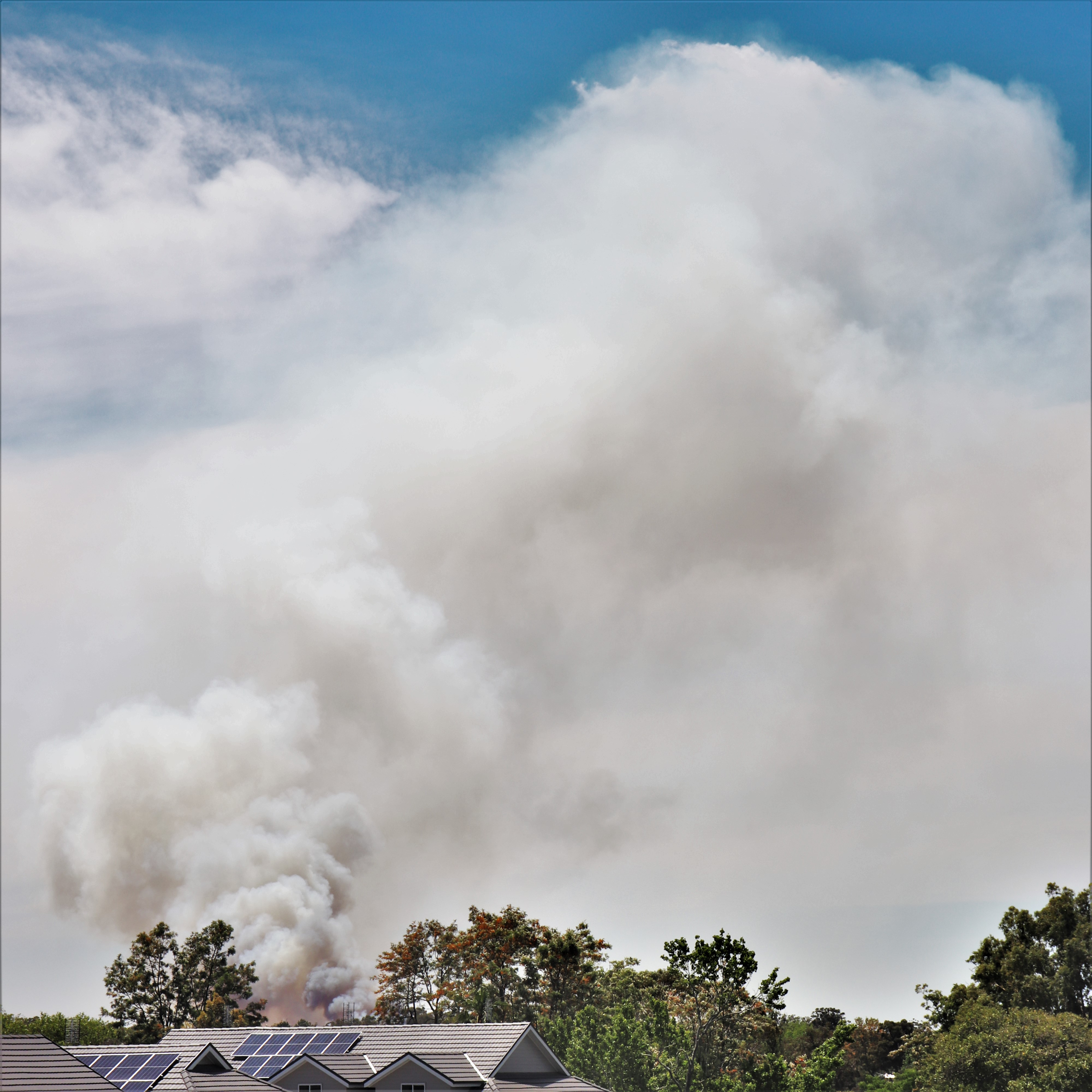
Smoke caused by a fire in Awaba

On the Carrai Plateau west of Kempsey, a fire burnt in wilderness areas where locked up and poorly maintained fire trails made combating it difficult. This fire joined up with the Stockyard Creek fire and together with the Coombes Gap fire and swept east towards Willawarrin, Temagog, Birdwood, Yarras, Bellangary, Kindee and Upper Rollands Plains. Land around Nowendoc and Yarrowich was also burnt. This fire burnt more than 40,000 hectares (98,842 acres), destroying numerous homes and claiming the lives of three people.

North-west of Harrington near the Cattai Wetlands a fire started on 28 October, this fire threatened the towns of Harrington, Crowdy Head and Johns River as it burnt north towards Dunbogan. This fire claimed one life at Johns River, where it also destroyed homes, and burnt more than 12,000 hectares (29,653 acres).

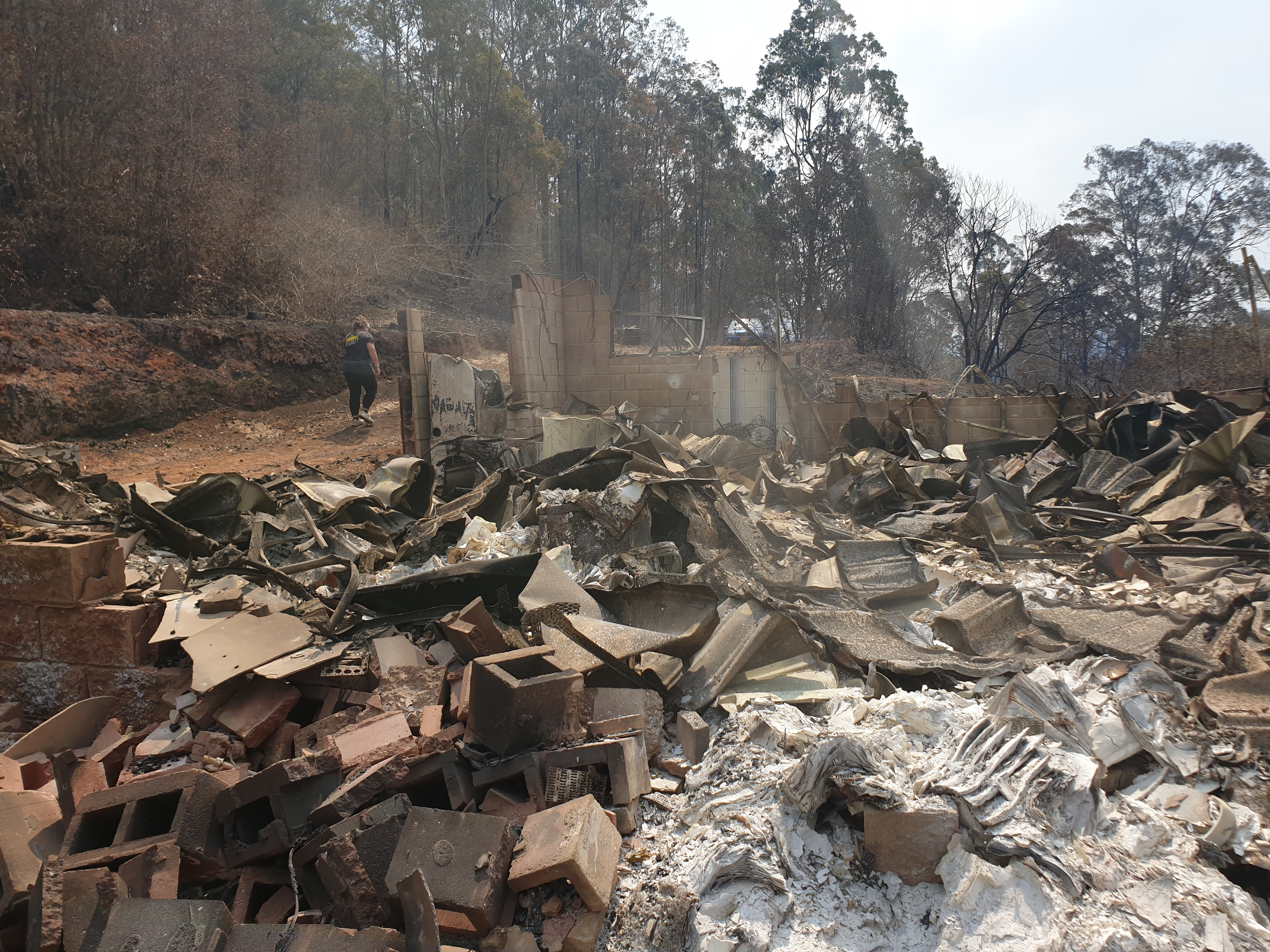
House destroyed in Hillville, NSW on 12 November 2019

At Hillville, a fire grew large due to hot and windy conditions, resulting in disorder in the nearby town of Taree, to the north. Buses were called in early to take students home before the fire threat became too dangerous. On 9 November, the fire reached Old Bar and Wallabi Point, threatening many properties. The following two days saw the fire reach Tinonee and Taree South, threatening the Taree Service Centre. Water bombers dropped water on the facility to protect it. The fire briefly turned in the direction of Nabiac before wind pushed it towards Failford. Other communities affected included Rainbow Flat, Khappinghat, Kooringhat and Purfleet. A spot fire jumped into Ericsson Lane, threatening businesses. It ultimately burnt 31,268 hectares (77,260 acres).

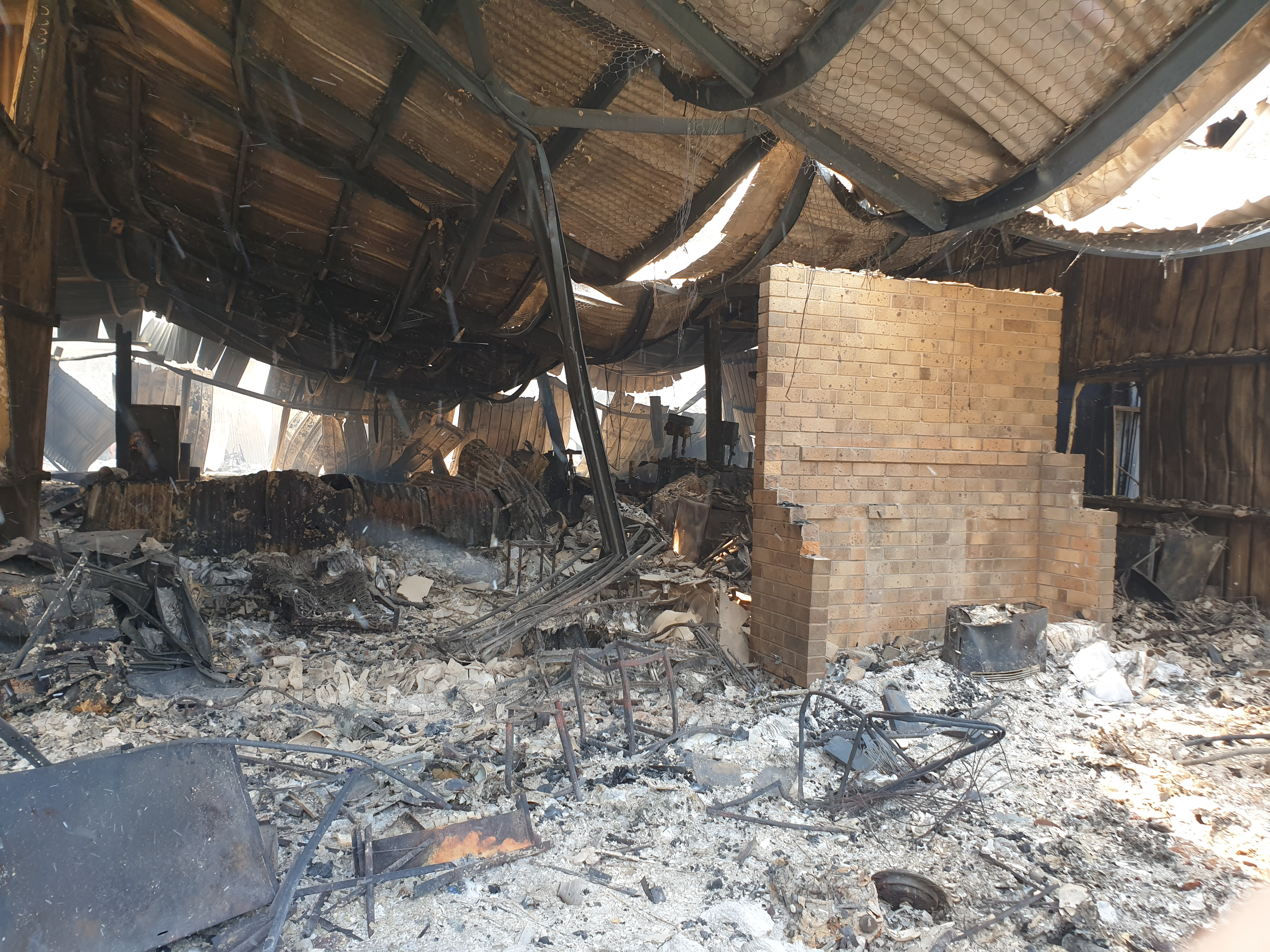
The Hillville fire destroyed this house and machinery shed on a farm in Hillville on 14 November 2019

At Dingo Tops National Park a small fire turned into a massive bushfire emergency as it impacted the small village of Bobin; numerous homes and the Bobin Public School were destroyed in the fire. Fourteen homes were lost on one street in Bobin. The NSWRFS sent out alerts to people in Killabakh, Upper Lansdowne, Kippaxs, Elands, and Marlee to monitor conditions.

2019 Rally Australia, planned to be the final round of the 2019 World Rally Championship, was a motor racing event scheduled to be held in Coffs Harbour across 14–17 November. A week before the rally was due to begin, the bushfire began to affect the region surrounding Coffs Harbour, with event organisers shortening the event in response to the deteriorating conditions. With the situation worsening, repeated calls from competitors (most of which were European-based) to cancel the event prevailed with the event cancelled on 12 November.

In late December 2019, fires started on both sides of the Pacific Highway around the Coopernook region. They burnt 278 hectares (687 acres) before they were brought under control.

==== Blue Mountains and Hawkesbury ====
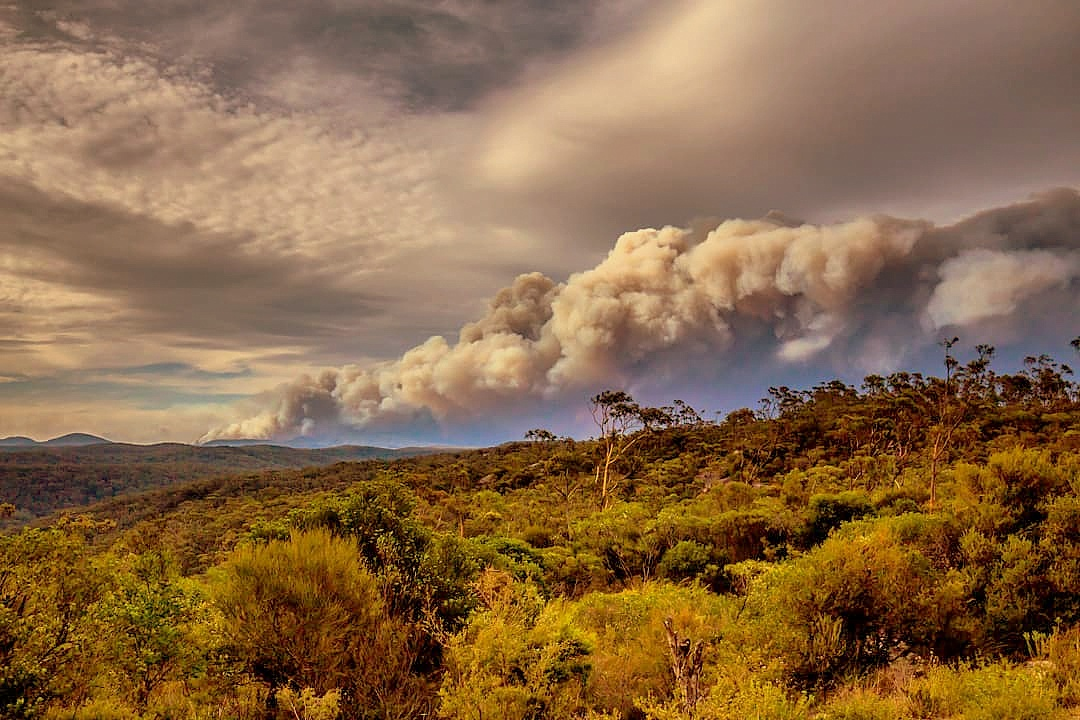
Gospers Mountain bushfire in December 2019

A large fire in November at Gospers Mountain in the Wollemi National Park burnt over 496,976 ha (1,228,050 acres) and threatened homes in the Hawkesbury and Lithgow areas. The fire was projected to burn towards the Central Coast and potentially threaten properties in Wisemans Ferry and other townships.

In an attempt to protect the Blue Mountains from the Gospers Mountain bushfire, firefighters commenced a large backburn on 14 December from the corner of Mt Wilson and Bells Line of Road. The backburn quickly grew out of control, jumping across Mt Wilson Road and threatening houses in Mount Wilson. On 15 December, the escaped backburn impacted Mount Tomah, Berambing and Bilpin. The fire destroyed numerous houses and buildings in this area and spread into the Grose Valley.

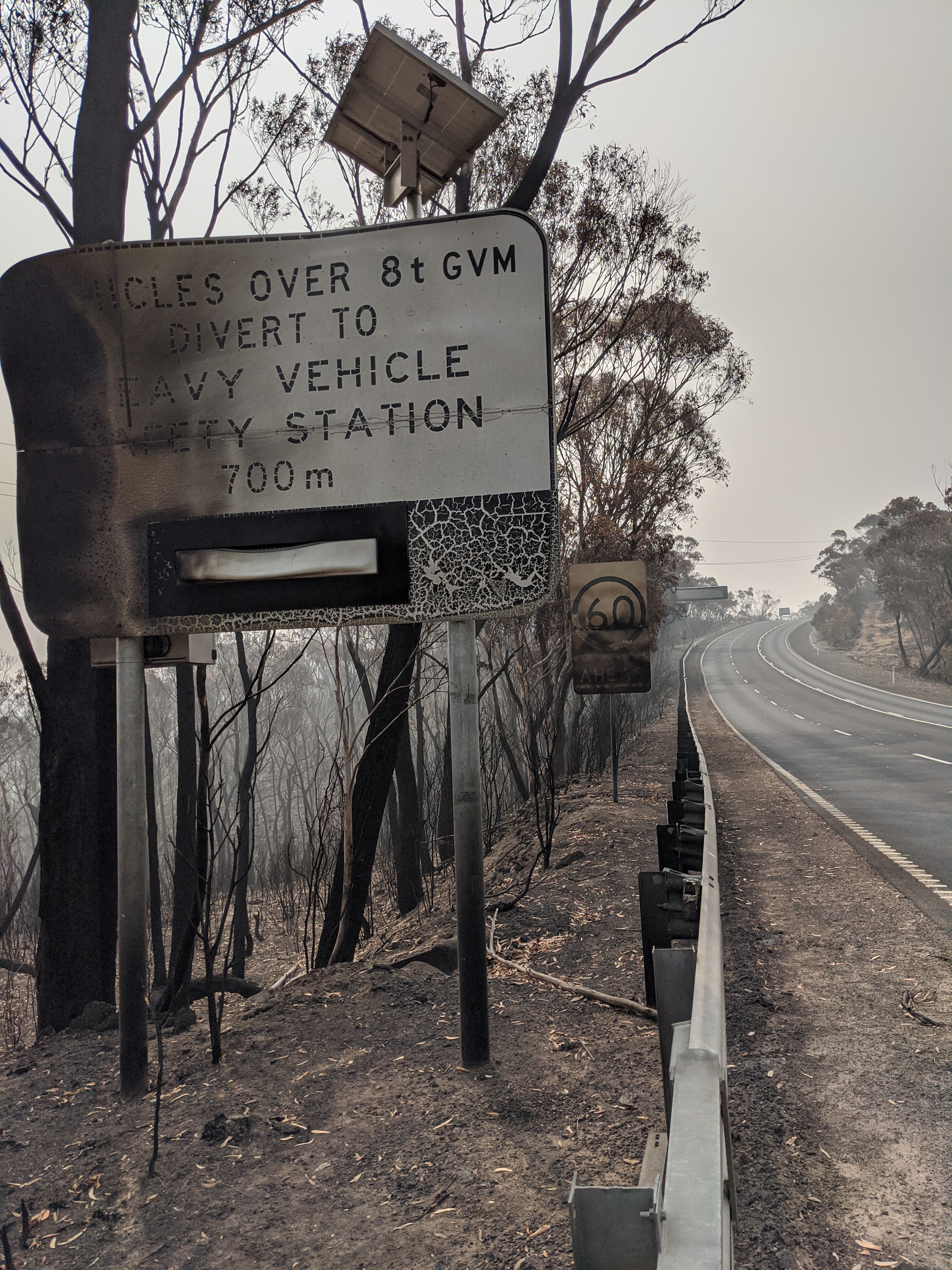
Damaged road signs along Bells Line of Road

On 19 December the RFS Mt Wilson Backburn escape impacted on the Darling Causeway between Mount Victoria and Bell, it later jumped the Darling Causeway and impacted the Grose Valley and the fire would be split into two fires: Grose Valley fire and Gospers Mountain fire. On 21 December, a catastrophic day, the Mt Wilson Backburn (the southern part of which was now designated the "Grose Valley fire") impacted Mount Victoria, Blackheath, Bell, Clarence, Dargan and Bilpin with resultant destruction of dozens of homes. On the same day the escaped RFS Mt Wilson Backburn fire moved towards Kurrajong. Further buildings were destroyed as a result of backburning operations in Blackheath along Evans Lookout Road.

By 15 December, the "Gospers Mountain fire" had grown to 350,000 hectares (860,000 acres). There have been persistent myths that the "Gospers Mountain Fire" was the largest fire from a single ignition source in Australian history. This is inaccurate. The Gospers Mountain Fire was a result of multiple ignition points, the majority of which were the result of large scale strategic backburning operations that escaped control. The estimated total area burnt by escaped backburning around the Gospers Mountain Fire is over 130,000 hectares. As of 27 December, the Gospers Mountain fire, including the numerous backburn escapes ignited by the NSW Rural Fire Service, had burnt over 500,000 hectares (1,200,000 acres); and, after burning approximately 512,000 hectares (1,270,000 acres) across the Lithgow, Hawkesbury and Central Coast local government areas, the NSW Rural Fire Service reported the fire as contained on 12 January 2020, stating that the fire was caused by a lightning strike on 26 October. Whilst the original ignition may have been caused by lightning, the subsequent, separate ignitions caused by RFS backburning contributed greatly to the spread of the fire and the impacted the ability of the RFS to deploy sufficient resources to defend communities.

==== Sydney ====
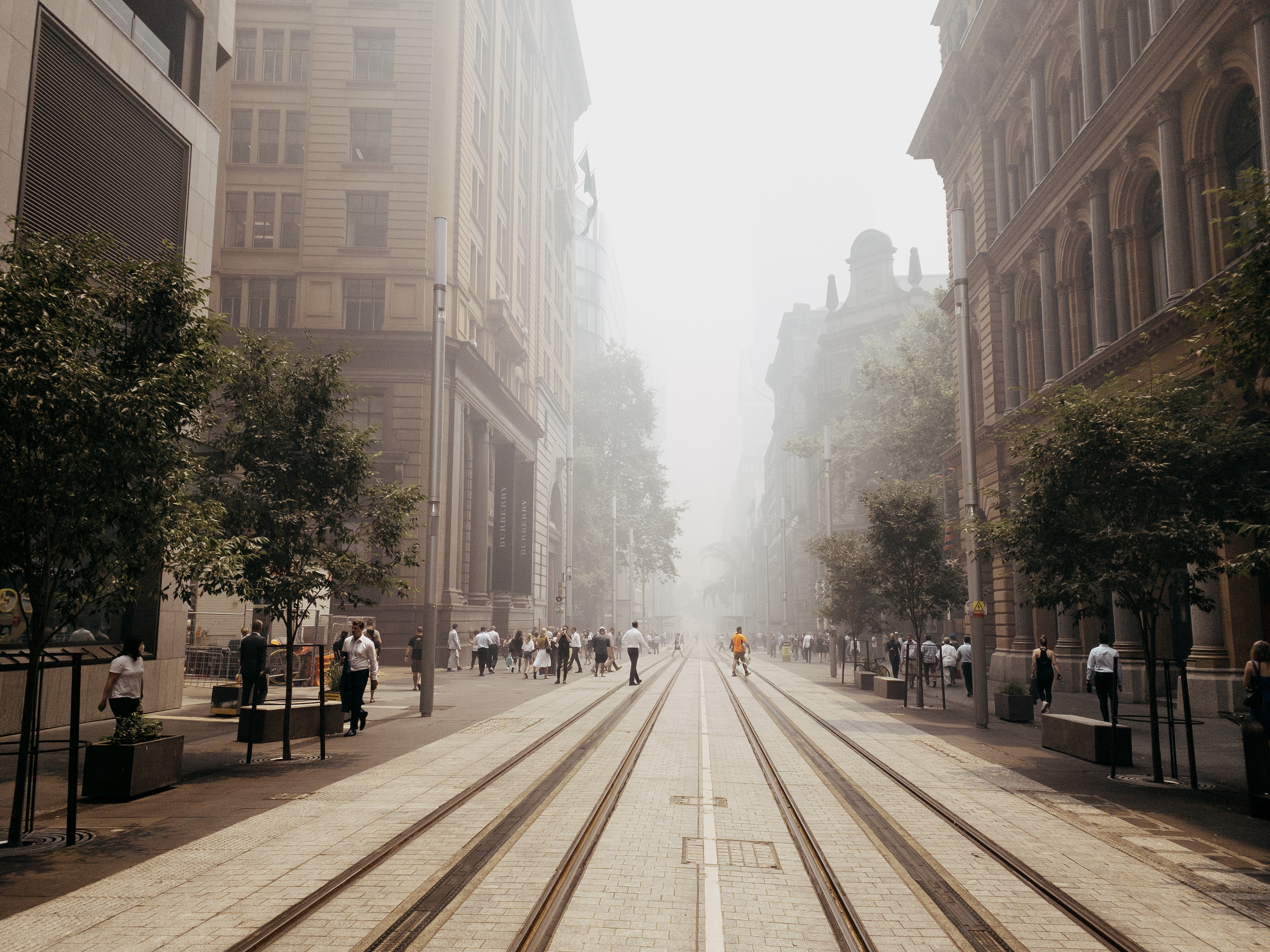
George Street in the Sydney CBD blanketed by smoke in December 2019

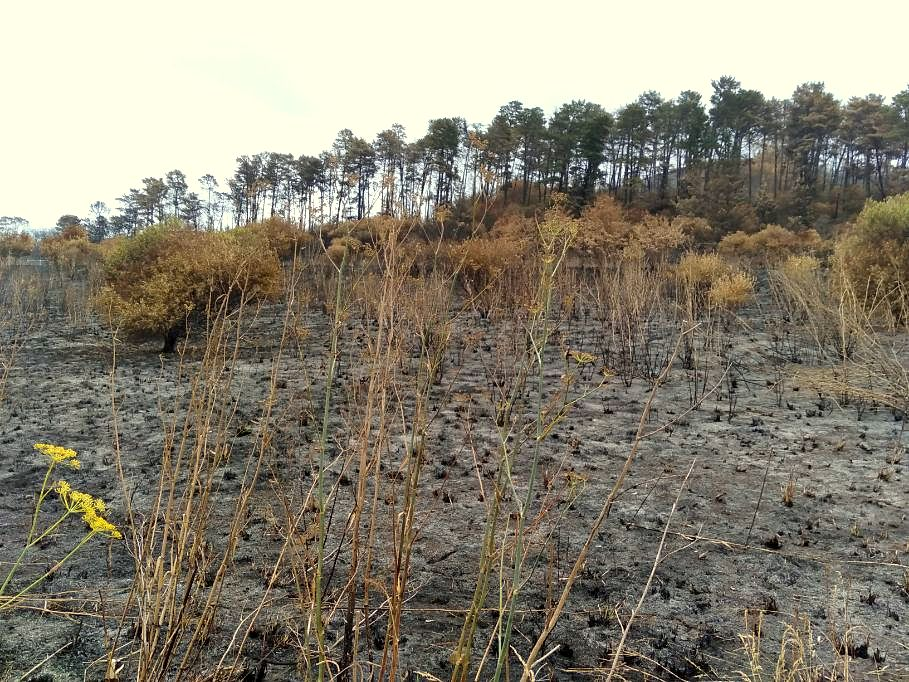
Bushland in Marrong Reserve, Western Sydney charred after grass fire.

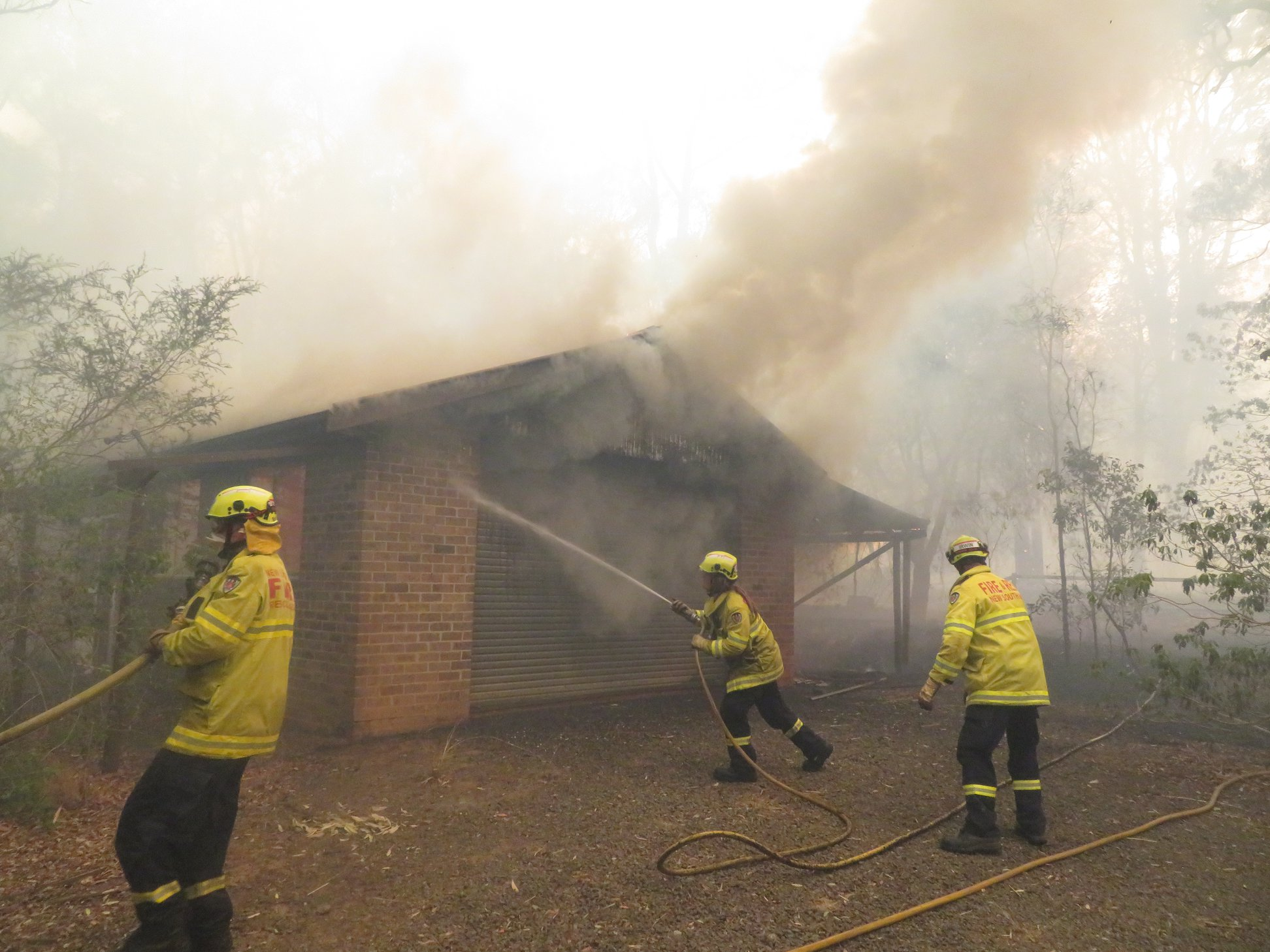
Firefighters work to save a burning house from an out-of-control bushfire in South West Sydney

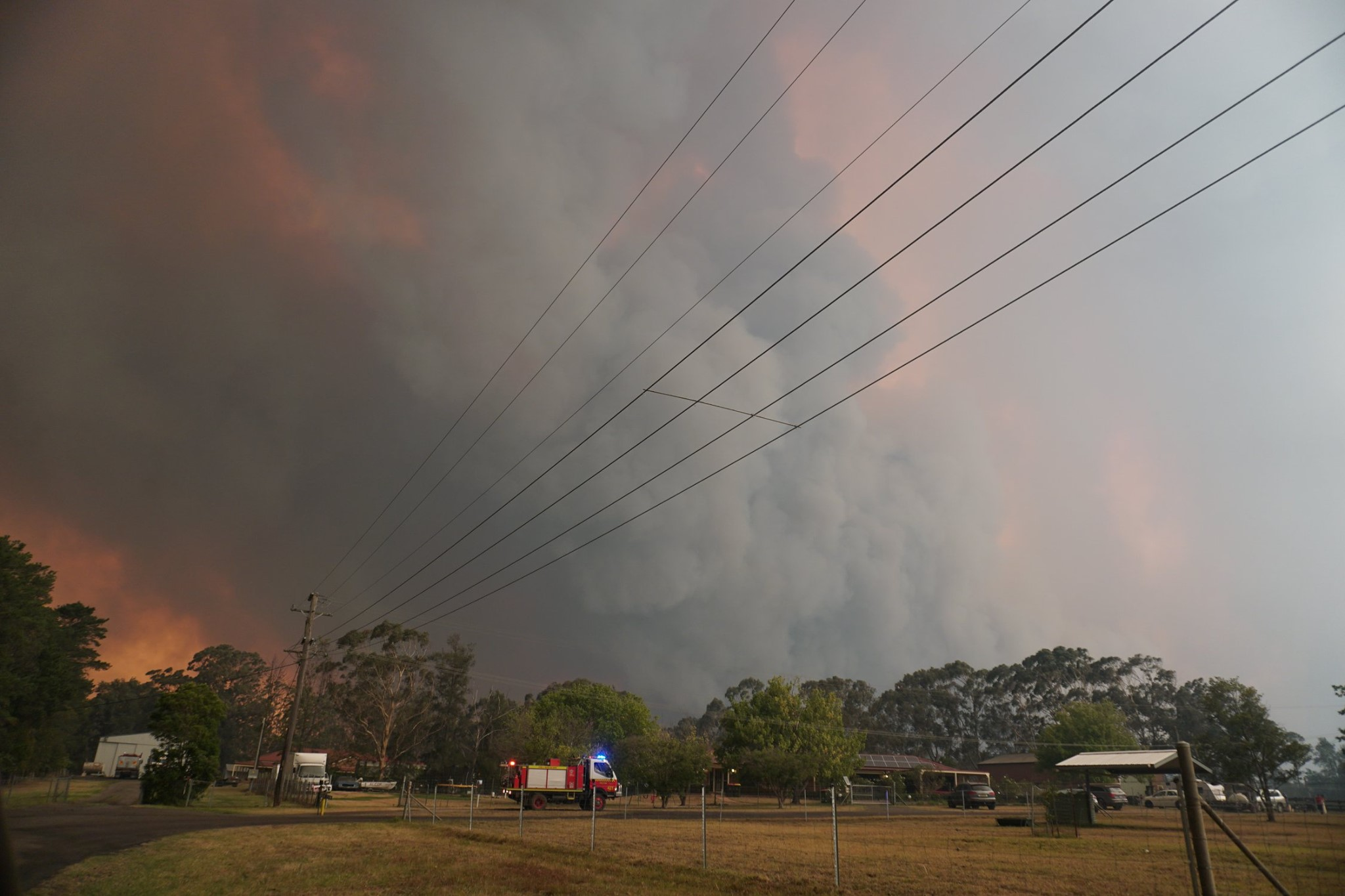
Fire crews move in to protect properties from an out-of-control bushfire in South West Sydney

On 12 November, under Sydney's first ever catastrophic fire conditions, a fire broke out in the Lane Cove National Park south of Turramurra. Under strong winds and extreme heat the fire spread rapidly, growing out of control and impacting the suburban interface across South Turramurra. One house caught alight in Lyon Avenue, but was saved by quick responding firefighters. As further crews arrived and worked to protect properties, a C-130 Air Tanker made several fire retardant drops directly over firefighters and houses, saving the rest of the suburb. The fire was ultimately brought under control several hours later, with one firefighter injured suffering a broken arm.

Because of the bushfires occurring in the surrounding regions, the Sydney metropolitan area suffered from dangerous smoky haze for several days throughout December. On some days, the air quality was eleven times the hazardous level, making it even worse than New Delhi's. The conditions were likened to "smoking 32 cigarettes" by Associate Professor Brian Oliver, a respiratory diseases scientist at the University of Technology Sydney.

On 10 December the fire impacted the south-western Sydney suburbs of Nattai and Oakdale, followed by Orangeville and Werombi, threatening hundreds of houses and resulting in the destruction of one building. The fire continued to flare up sporadically, coming out of the dense bush and threatening properties in Oakdale and Buxton on 14 and 15 December. The fire moved south-east towards the populated areas of the Southern Highlands and impacted the townships of Balmoral, Buxton, Bargo, Couridjah and Tahmoor in far south-western Sydney. Substantial property losses occurred across these areas, in particular multiple fire trucks were overrun by fire, with several firefighters taken to hospital and two airlifted in critical condition. Later that night, two firefighters were killed when a tree fell onto the road and their tanker rolled, injuring three other crew members. The situation deteriorated on 21 December when the fire changed direction and attacked Balmoral and Buxton once more from the opposite side, with major property losses in both areas. On New Year's Eve there were fears of this fire impacting the towns of Mittagong, Braemar, and surrounding areas.

On 31 December, a grass fire broke out in the sloped woodlands of Prospect Hill, in Western Sydney, where it headed north towards Pemulwuy along the Prospect Highway. The fire impacted a large industrial area and threatened numerous properties before being brought under control by 9:30pm. Approximately 10 hectares (25 acres) and a number of historic Monterey pine trees were burnt.

The Sydney City fireworks display was allowed to continue with a special exemption from fire authorities, despite protests. Despite warnings from authorities, numerous fires were sparked across Sydney as a result of illegal fireworks, including a blaze which threatened properties at Cecil Hills in Sydney's south west.

On 4 January, Sydney's western suburb Penrith recorded its hottest day on record at 48.9 °C (120.0 °F) making it the hottest place on Earth at the time.

On 5 January, a fire broke out in bushland at Voyager Point in Sydney's south-west, spreading rapidly under a strong southerly wind and impacting numerous houses in Voyager Point and Hammondville. As the fire moved north, authorities closed the M5 Motorway due to smoke conditions and prepared for the fire to impact the New Brighton housing estate. Firefighters on the ground assisted by numerous waterbombing aircraft held the fire south of the motorway and prevented any property losses, containing the fire to 60 hectares (150 acres).

==== Southern Highlands ====
In late October, a number of fires started in remote bushland near Lake Burragorang in the Kanangra-Boyd National Park south-west of Sydney. Due to the extreme isolation of the area and rugged inaccessible terrain, firefighters struggled to contain the fires as they began to spread through the dense bushland. These multiple fires ultimately all merged to become the Green Wattle Creek fire. The fire continued to grow in size and intensity, burning towards the township of Yerranderie. Firefighters undertook backburning around the town whilst helicopters and fixed wing aircraft worked to control the spread of the fire. The fire passed Yerranderie but continued to burn through the national park towards south-western Sydney. On 5 December under severe weather conditions, the fire jumped the Lake Burragorang and began burning towards populated areas within the Wollondilly area.

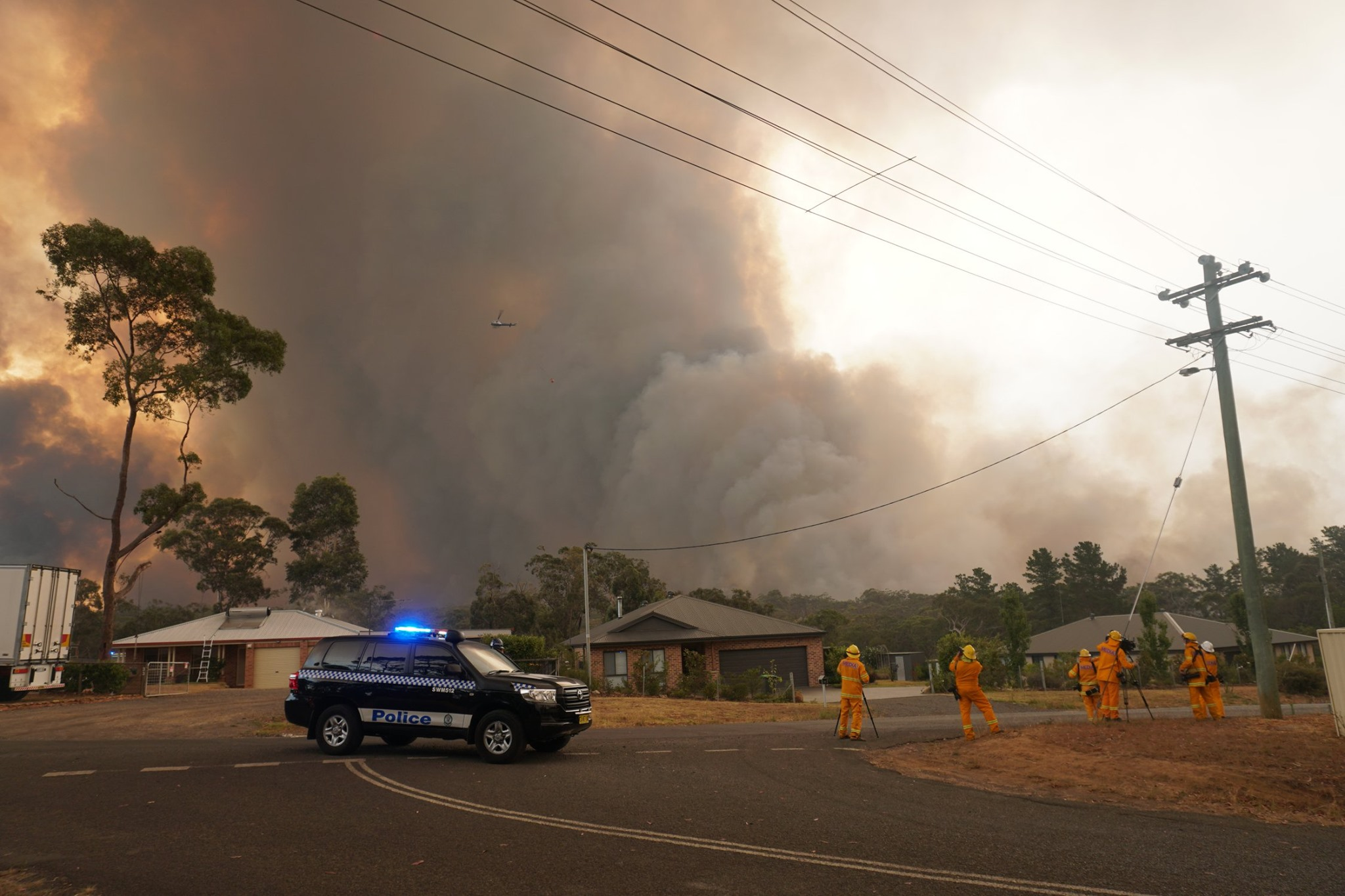
Large out-of-control bushfire approaches the New South Wales township of Yanderra

On 19 December, the fire continued east towards the Hume Highway (resulting in its closure for several hours), impacting the township of Yanderra. Over the following days as the fire continued to progress to the south east, both Yerrinbool and Hill Top were threatened by the fire.

As well as expanding to the south and east, the fire also spread in a westerly direction, headed towards Oberon. The Oberon Correctional Centre was evacuated in anticipation of the advancing fire impact along its western flank. On 2 January, the fire hit the popular and historic Jenolan Caves area, destroying multiple buildings including the local fire station. The centrepiece of the precinct, Jenolan Caves House, was saved.

==== South Coast ====
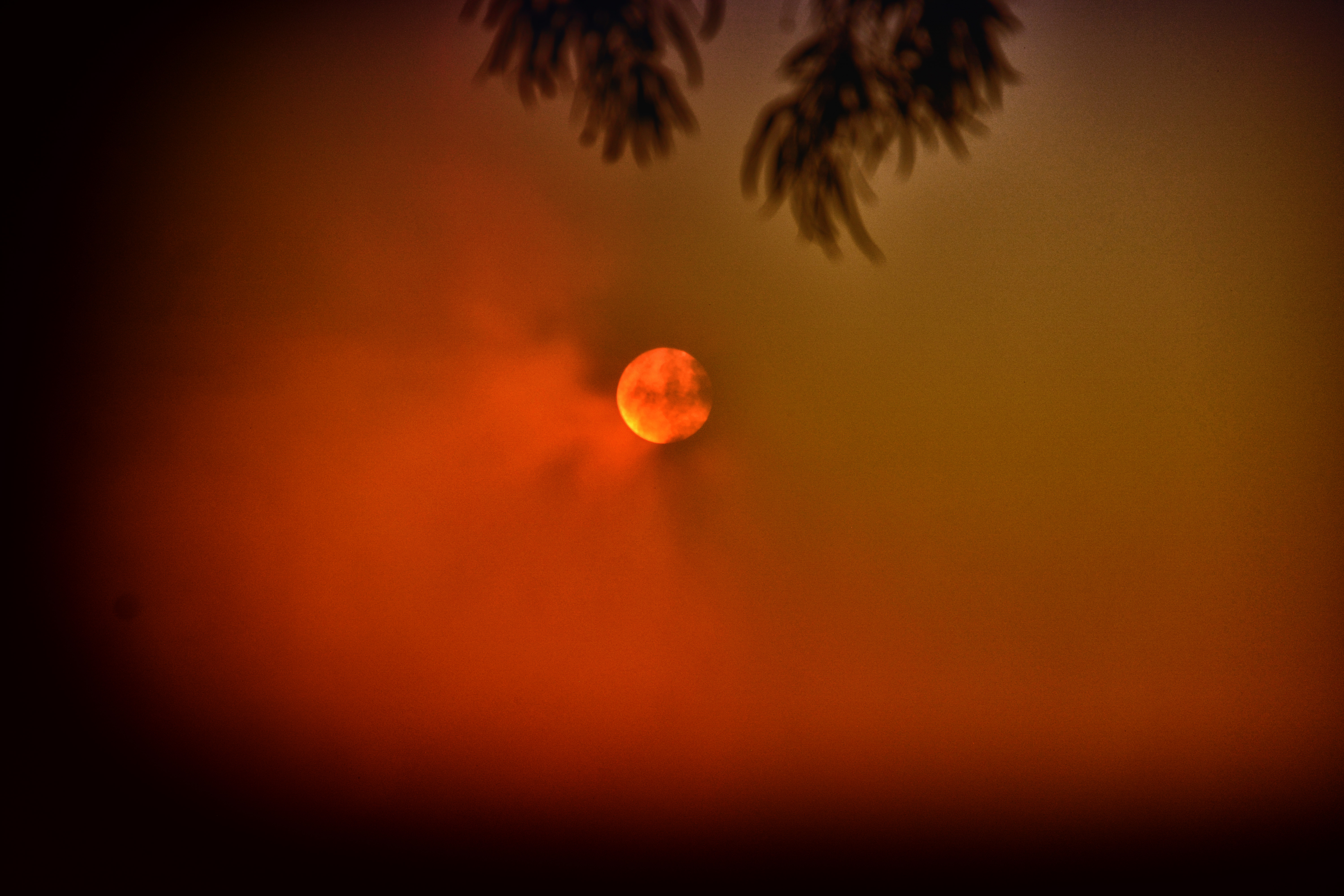
Afternoon sun in Gosford, New South Wales in November 2019.

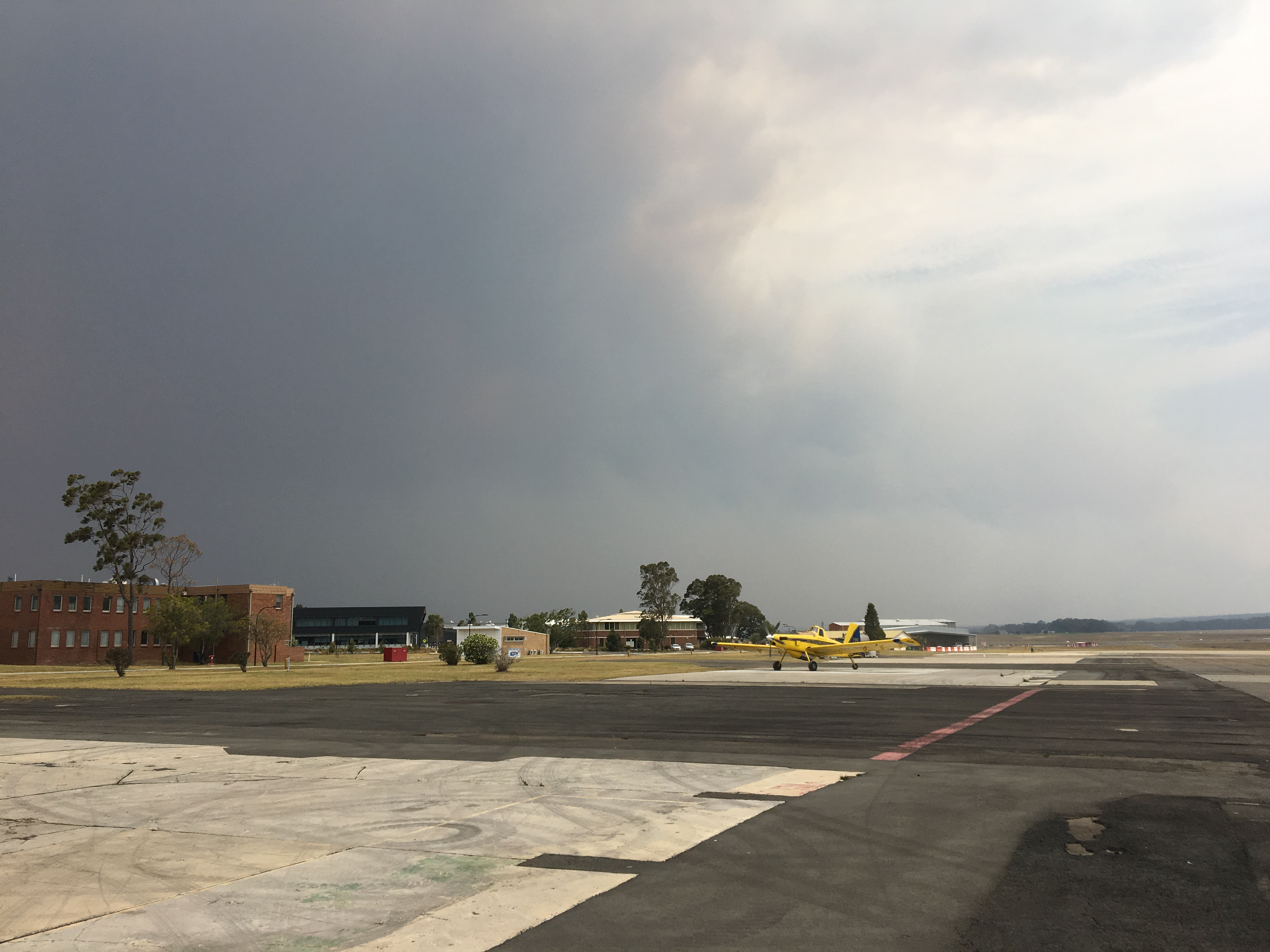
Smoke rises from the Tianjara fire, viewed from HMAS Albatross.

On 30 November weather conditions drastically deteriorated across the south-eastern areas of the state, with major fires breaking out and escalating in the Dampier State Forest, Deua River Valley, Badja, Bemboka, Wyndham, Talmalolma and Ellerslie, hampering firefighters already stretched by the Currowan, Palerang and Clyde Mountain fires. As temperatures were forecast to reach 41 °C (106 °F) on the South Coast, Premier Berejiklian declared a seven-day state of emergency on 2 January 2020 with effect from 9 am on the following day, including an unprecedented 14,000-square-kilometre (5,400 sq mi) "tourist leave zone" from Nowra to the edge of Victoria's northern border.

A blaze on the South Coast started off at Currowan and travelled up to the coastline after jumping across the Princes Highway, threatening properties around Termeil. Residents in Bawley Point, Kioloa, Depot Peach, Pebbly Beach, North Durras and Pretty Beach were told to either evacuate to Batemans Bay or Ulladulla or stay to protect their property. One home was lost. As of 2 January 2020, the Currowan fire was burning between Batemans Bay in the south, Nowra in the north, and east of Braidwood in the west. The fire had burnt more than 258,000 hectares (640,000 acres) and was out of control. The Currowan fire had merged with the Tianjara fire in the Morton National Park to the south west of Nowra; and the Charleys Forest fire had grown along the fire's western flank; and on the fire's southern flank, the fire had merged with the Clyde Mountain fire.

By 26 December, the Clyde Mountain fire was burning on the southern side of the Kings Highway, into the Buckenbowra and Runnyford areas. Around 4 am on 31 December, the fire had crossed the Princes Highway near Mogo, and the highway was closed between Batemans Bay and Moruya. Around 7 am on 31 December, the fire impacted the southern side of Batemans Bay, causing the loss of around ten businesses and damage to many others. The fire also crossed the Princes Highway in the vicinity of Round Hill and impacted the residential suburbs of Catalina, as well as beach suburbs from Sunshine Bay to Broulee. Residents and holiday makers were forced to flee to the beaches. On the 23 January this fire escalated back to emergency level as the blaze roared towards the coastal town of Moruya, a town largely unaffected by bushfires in recent weeks.

At nearby Lake Conjola, numerous homes were lost as the embers jumped across the lake, landing in gutters and lighting up houses. On one street there were only four houses still standing. As of 2 January 2020, at least two people died and a woman was missing. Isolated hamlets of Bendalong and Manyana and Cunjurong Point were additionally ablaze, with holiday-makers evacuated on 3 January 2020. As of 6 January 2020, all were still without power.

As of 5 January 2020, in the Bega Valley Shire, the border fire that started in north-eastern Victoria was burning north into New South Wales towards the major town of Eden, and had impacted the settlements of Wonboyn and surrounding areas including Kiah, Lower Towamba and parts of Boydtown. Part of the fire was burning in inaccessible country and continued to head in a north-westerly direction towards Bombala as well as northerly to just south of Nethercote. The fire had burnt more than 60,000 hectares (150,000 acres) and was out of control.

==== Riverina ====
On 30 December, the Green Valley fire burning east of Albury near Talmalmo (which had started the day prior) developed into an unprecedented fire event for the Snowy Valleys as a result of extreme local conditions. The smoke plume rose to an estimated 8,000 metres (26,000 ft) and developed a pyro-cumulonimbus cloud, becoming a firestorm. The result was extreme, the wind was described by crews on the ground as in excess of 100 km/h (62 mph), with spot fires starting over 5 km (3.1 mi) ahead of the main fire front.

Firefighters described what they believed to be a tornado generated by the fire storm, which began flattening trees and flipped a small fire vehicle. The tornado then impacted a crew of firefighters working to protect a property, flipping their tanker over and trapping the crew inside, who were then overrun by fire. One firefighter was killed with multiple others injured, with one airlifted to Melbourne and two to Sydney.

==== Snowy Mountains ====
The Dunns Road fire was believed to have been started by a lightning strike on 28 December in a private pine plantation near Adelong. In the Snowy Valleys local government area, by 2 January 2020 the Dunns Road fire had burnt south of the Snowy Mountains Highway in the Ellerslie Range near Kunama. Over 130,000 hectares (320,000 acres) was burnt and the fire was out of control. The NSWRFS issued an evacuation order to residents in the Batlow and Wondalga areas. Residents and visitors to the Kosciuszko National Park were evacuated and the national park was closed. 155 inmates from the Mannus Correctional Centre near Tumbarumba were evacuated.

On 3 January 2020, the Dunns Road fire burnt from Batlow into Kosciuszko National Park, burning much of the northern part of the park. The fire caused significant damage, severely damaging the Selwyn Snow Resort, destroying structures in the town of Cabramurra and almost completely destroying the heritage-listed precinct (and birthplace of skiing in Australia) of Kiandra. Kiandra's historic former courthouse was left with only its walls standing after a fire so hot that the glass and aluminium in the windows melted. A number of high country huts, including Wolgal Hut and Pattinsons Hut near Kiandra, were also feared to have been destroyed. By 11 January three fires had merged – the Dunns Road fire, the East Ournie Creek, and the Riverina's Green Valley fire – and had created a 600,000-hectare (1,482,632-acre) "mega-fire", burning south of the Snowy Mountains.

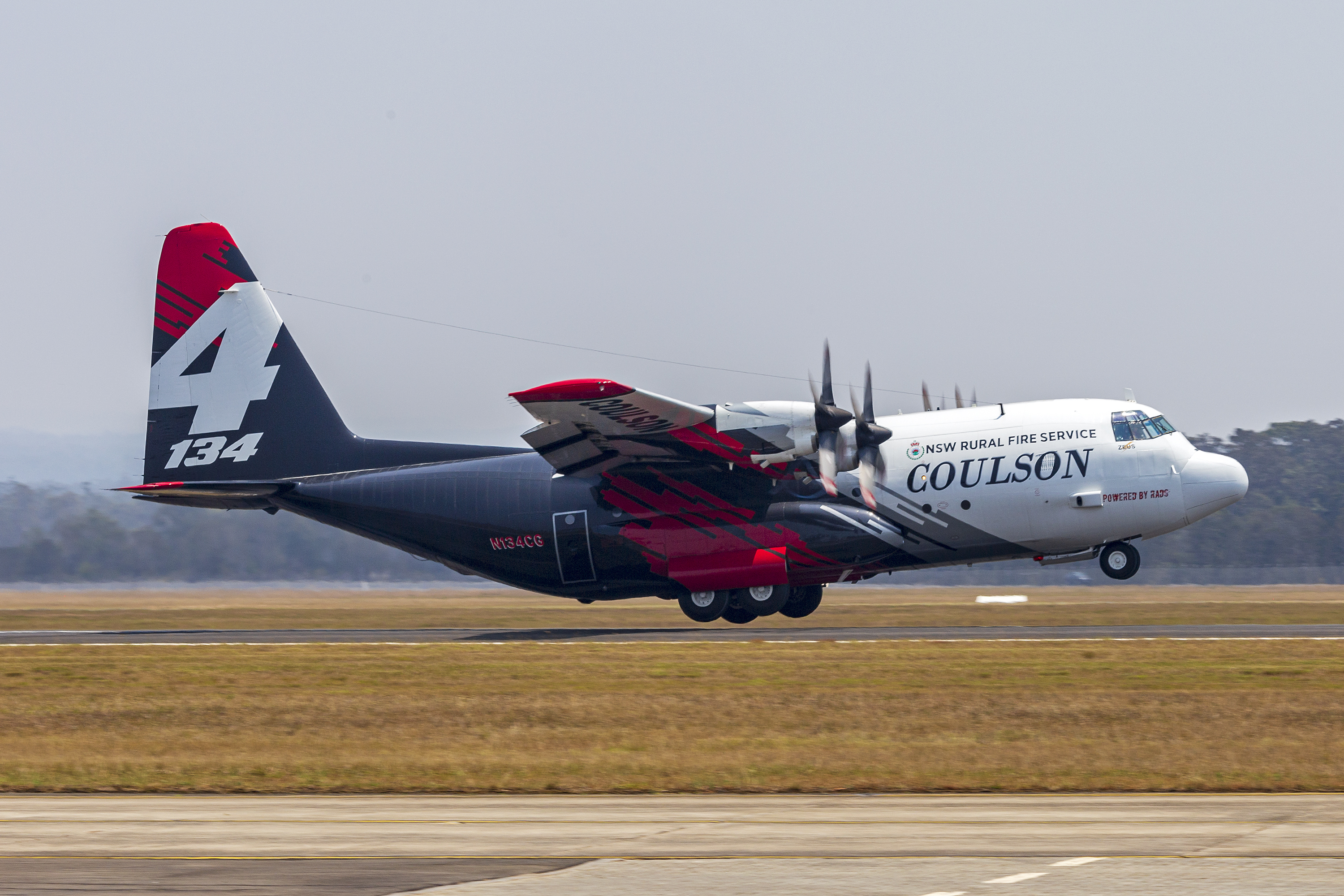
Coulson Aviation Lockheed EC-130Q Hercules N134CG 'Zeus' which crashed on 23 January 2020, seen here at HMAS Albatross in December 2019.

On 23 January, a Lockheed C-130 Hercules large air tanker crashed near Cooma while waterbombing a blaze, resulting in the death of the three American crew members on board.

=== Victoria ===
On 21 November, lightning strikes ignited a series of fires in East Gippsland, initially endangering the communities of Buchan, Buchan South and Sunny Point. On 20 December, the Marthavale-Barmouth Spur expanded, greatly endangering the community of Tambo Crossing.

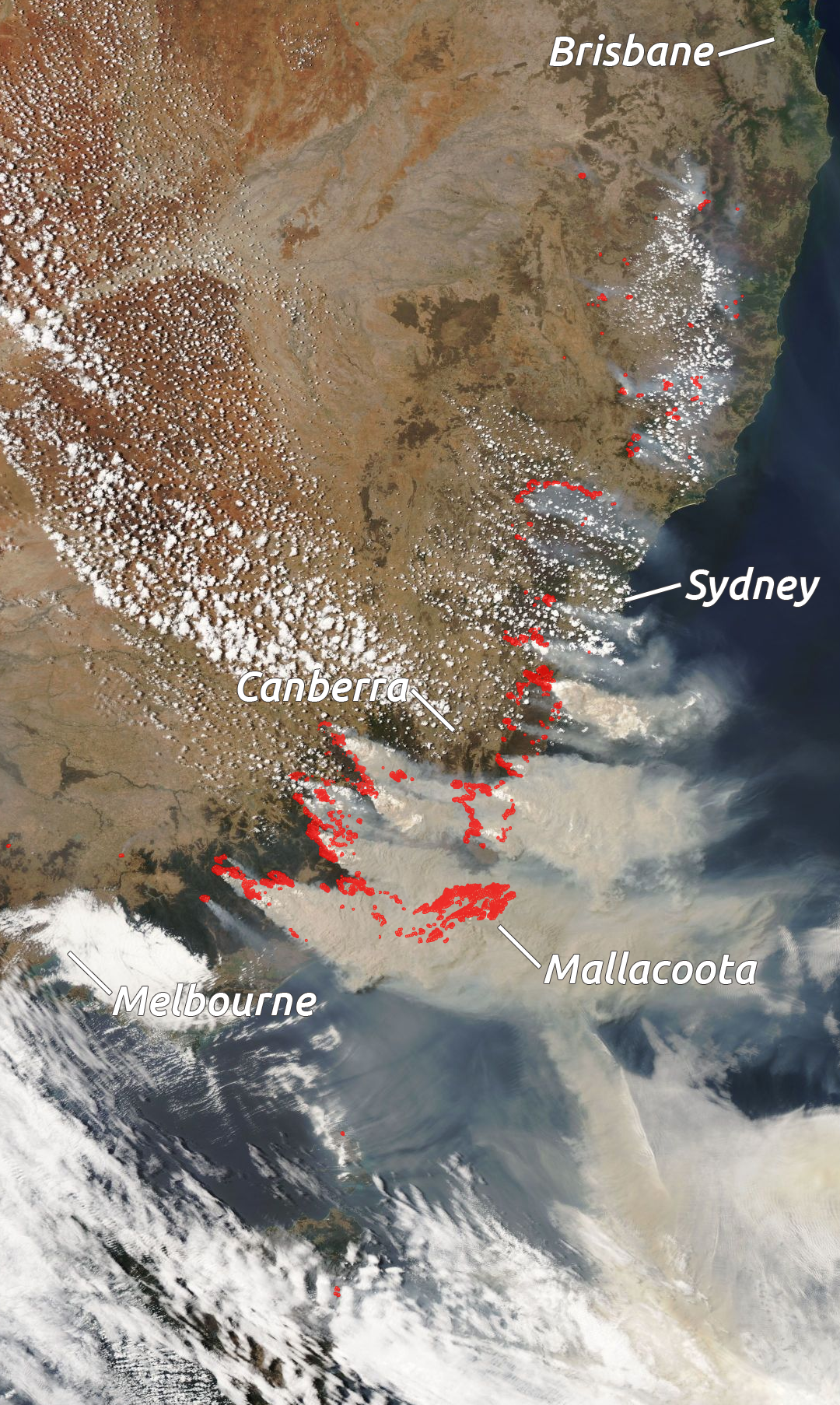
NASA satellite imagery on 4 January 2020 showing bushfires on southeast coast of Australia

The first day of two-day cricket tour match between a Victoria XI and New Zealand in Melbourne was cancelled due to extreme heat conditions.

On 30 December, there were three active fires in East Gippsland with a combined area of more than 130,000 hectares (320,000 acres), and another in the north-east of the state near Walwa heading south-east towards Cudgewa. An evacuation warning was issued for the East Gippsland town of Goongerah, which is surrounded by high-value old growth forests, as well as Cudgewa. On the same day, a fire broke out in the Plenty Gorge Parklands, situated in Melbourne's northern suburbs between Bundoora, Mill Park, South Morang, Greensborough and Plenty.

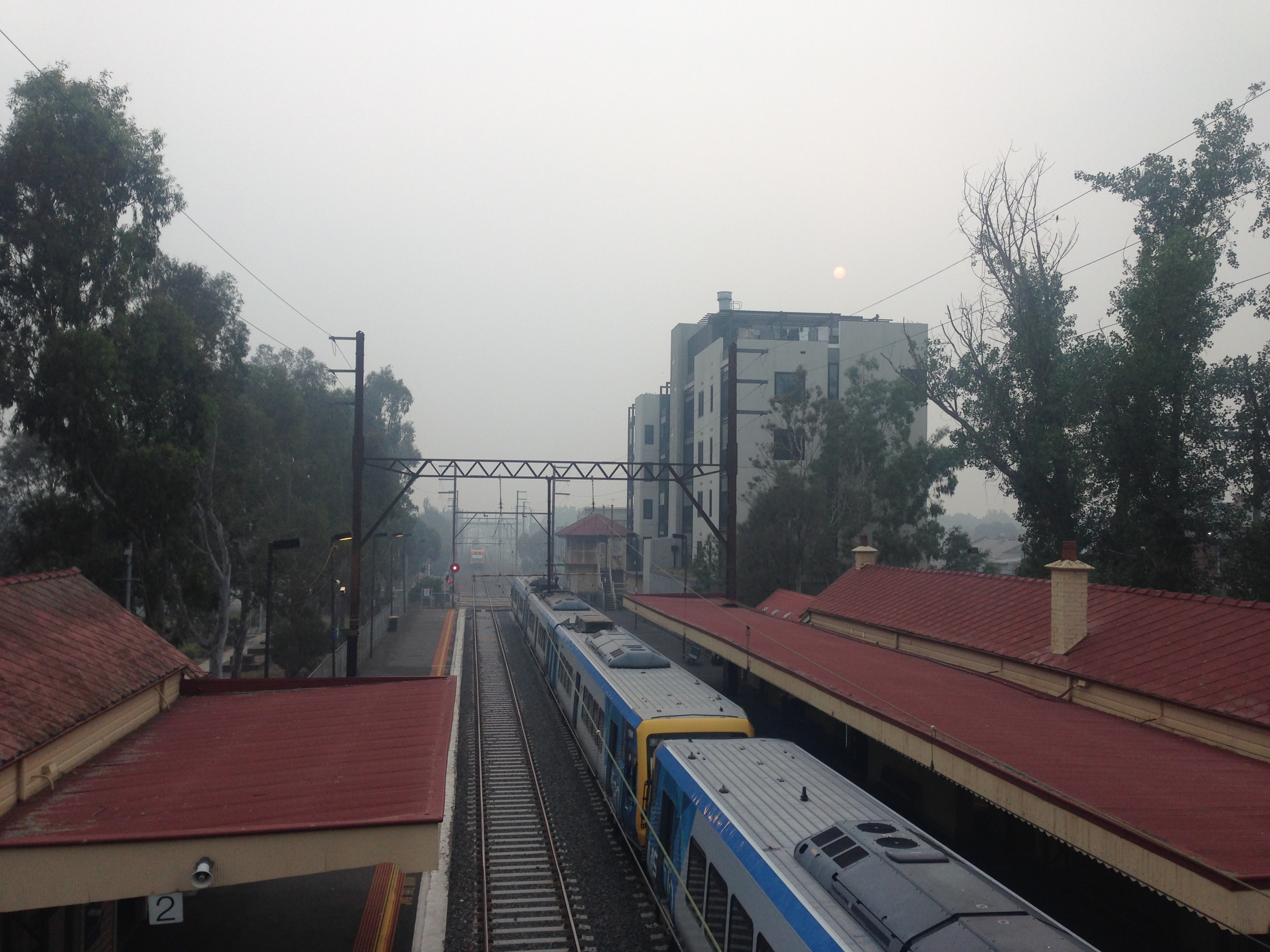
Smog and bushfire smoke over Fairfield Station in Melbourne. During the fires Melbourne had the worst recorded air quality in the world.

Fires reached the town of Mallacoota by around 8 am AEDT on 31 December 2019. At 11 am AEDT 31 December, fires had begun to approach the vacation town of Lakes Entrance. Despite the recommendation that large portions of East Gippsland be evacuated, approximately 30,000 holiday makers chose to remain in the region. Approximately 4,000 people, including 3,000 tourists, remained in Mallacoota as the fire began making its closest approach to the town, cutting off roads in the process; Mallacoota had not been issued with an evacuation warning on 29 December. On 3 January, approximately 1,160 people from Mallacoota were evacuated on naval vessels HMAS Choules and MV Sycamore.

On 2 January at 11 pm AEDT Victorian Premier Daniel Andrews declared a state of disaster under the provisions of the Victorian Emergency Management Act for the shires of East Gippsland, Mansfield, Wellington, Wangaratta Rural, Towong, and Alpine, and the alpine resorts of Mount Buller, Mount Hotham, and Mount Stirling. Emergency Management Commissioner Andrew Crisp stated that 780,000 hectares (1,900,000 acres) had burnt including 100,000 hectares (250,000 acres) near Corryong in the state's north-east and that fifty fires were burning. On 3 January, Premier Andrews said two people were confirmed dead from the East Gippsland fires.

On 6 January Premier Andrews said that bushfires had burnt through 1.2 million hectares (3 million acres) in Victoria's east and north-east and that 200 homes were confirmed lost.

On 13 January, two bushfires were burning at emergency level in Victoria despite milder conditions, one about 8 km east of Abbeyard and the other in East Gippsland affecting Tamboon, Tamboon South and Furnel.

On 23 January, there were still 12 fires burning in Victoria, the strongest in East Gippsland and the north-east. The Buldah fire in East Gippsland was at watch and act level and the rest were on advice level. Most of the 44 fires sparked by dry lightning were quickly dealt with by firefighters. Heavy rain in the Melbourne region brought little relief to bushfire-affected regions. Premier Daniel Andrews said that the rains could bring new dangers for firefighters, including landslides.

On 30 January, four days of hot weather were forecast for Victoria, New South Wales and South Australia bringing high fire danger with several uncontrolled bushfires still burning.

=== Queensland ===
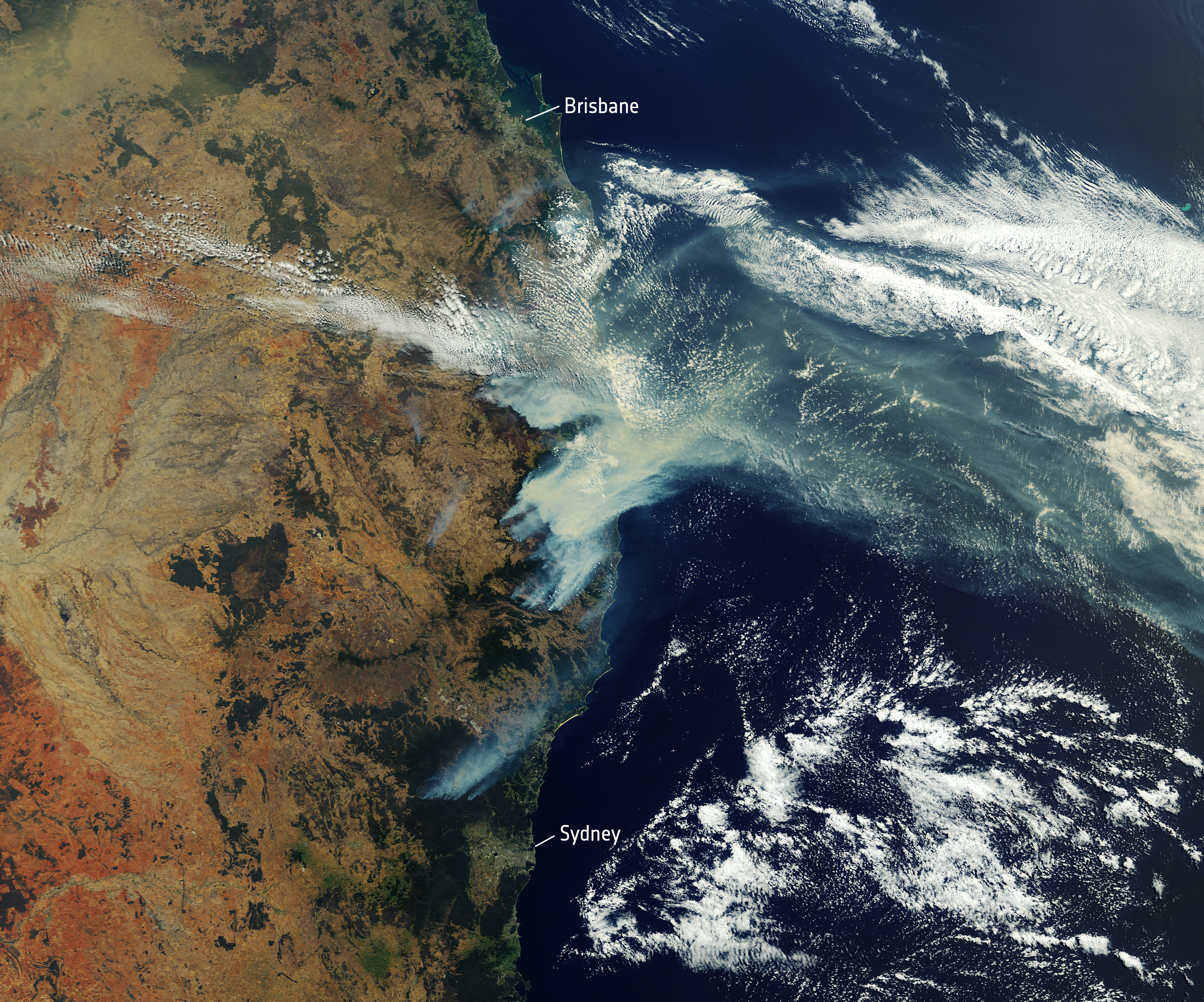
Satellite image of the smoke from the south-eastern Queensland and northern New South Wales bushfires in November 2019. At the time, the smoke spread eastward and reached Tasman Sea.

On 7 September 2019 multiple out of control blazes threatened townships across south-eastern and northern Queensland, destroying eleven houses in Beechmont, seven houses in Stanthorpe, and one house at Mareeba. On the following day the heritage-listed lodge and cabins at the iconic Australian nature-based Binna Burra Lodge were destroyed in the bushfire that consumed residential houses in Beechmont the previous day.

A large fire impacted the Peregian Beach area on 9 September, on the Sunshine Coast, severely damaging ten houses. In December 2019 Peregian Springs and the surrounding areas came under threat by bushfires for the second time in a couple of months. No homes were confirmed lost in this bushfire.

Due to deteriorating fire conditions and fires threatening homes across the state, on 9 November a State of Fire Emergency was declared across 42 local government areas across southern, central, northern and far-northern Queensland.

On 11 November a fire started in the Ravensbourne area near Toowoomba, which burnt through over 20,000 hectares (49,000 acres) of bush across several days, destroying six houses. At 8 am the air quality in Brisbane reached unprecedentedly poor levels (Woolloongabba PM2.5 238.8 μg/m^{3}). Queensland's chief health officer, Dr Jeanette Young, urged residents to stay indoors and to not physically exert themselves.

On 13 November a water bombing helicopter crashed while fighting the blazes threatening the small community of Pechey. While the Bell 214 helicopter was completely destroyed, the pilot walked away with minor injuries.

On 23 November the state of fire emergency was revoked and extended fire bans were put in place in local government areas that were previously affected under this declaration.

On 6 December a house fire broke out in Bundamba and quickly spread to nearby bushland and was placed under a watch and act alert by the Queensland Fire and Emergency Services that afternoon. The following day, after worsening conditions, the fire was upgraded to an emergency warning and began to threaten homes in the local community. The fire destroyed a shipping container filled with fireworks, and residents within the 3-square-kilometre (1.2 sq mi) exclusion zone were ordered to evacuate. One home was destroyed.

On 8 November a bushfire broke out in forestry to the west of the township of Jimna, causing Queensland Fire and Emergency services to issue a "watch and act" alert. The fire caused the evacuation of the entire town.

=== South Australia ===
On 11 November 2019 an emergency bushfire warning was issued for Port Lincoln in the Eyre Peninsula, with an uncontrolled fire traveling towards the town. The South Australian Country Fire Service ordered ten water bombers to the area to assist 26 ground crews at the scene. SA Power Networks disconnected power to the town.

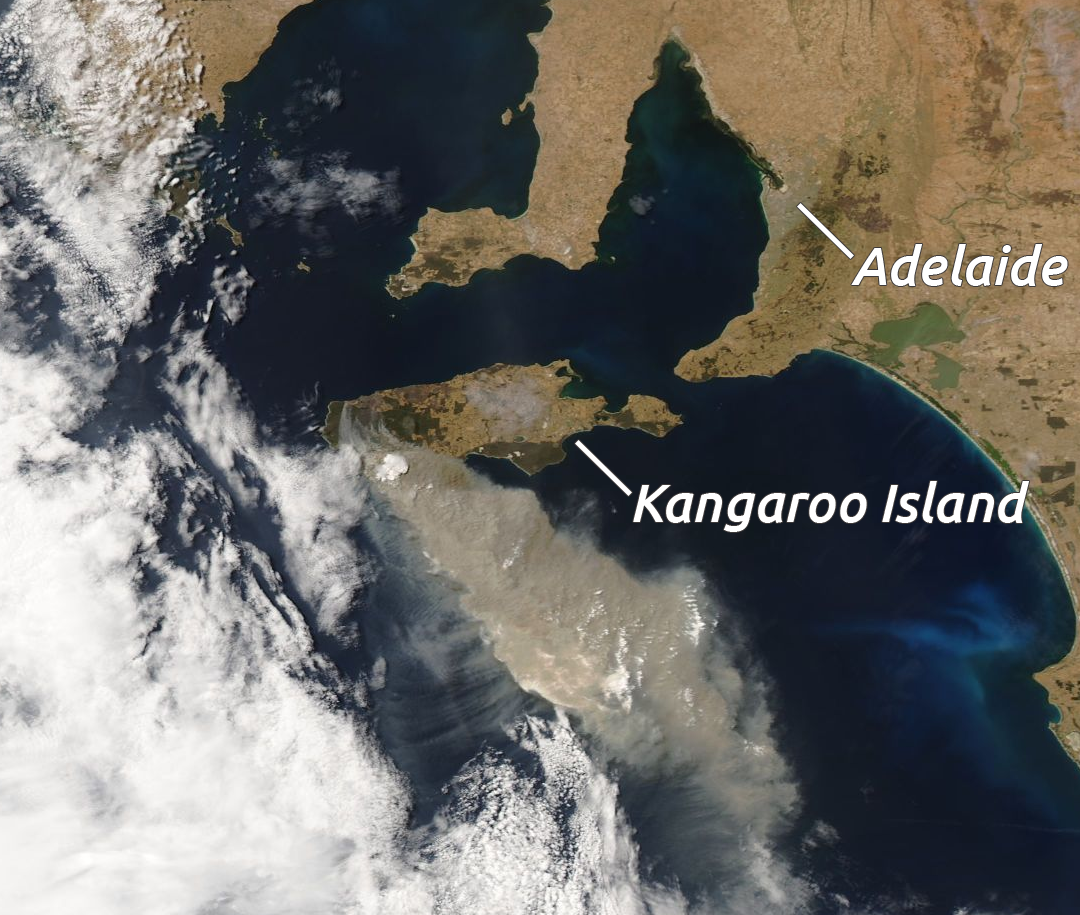
NASA satellite imagery on 3 January 2020 showing bushfires on Kangaroo Island.

A large fire broke out on Yorke Peninsula on 20 November 2019 and threatened the towns of Yorketown and Edithburgh. It destroyed at least eleven homes and burnt approximately 5,000 hectares (12,000 acres). The fire was believed to have started from a sparking electrical transformer. A Boeing 737 water-bombing aircraft from New South Wales in addition to South Australian Air Tractor AT-802s were used to protect the town of Edithburgh.

On 20 December fires took hold in the Adelaide Hills, and near Cudlee Creek in the Mount Lofty Ranges. Initial south-easterly winds put the towns of Lobethal and Lenswood in the line of the fire, and by the next morning the winds had changed to north-north-west, threatening other towns. The fires killed one person, more than 70 houses were destroyed, as well as over 400 outbuildings and 200 cars. Fires are still burning and the yearly Christmas celebrations at Lobethal were cancelled.

Also on 20 December, an out-of-control bushfire took hold near Angle Vale, starting from the Northern Expressway and burning through Buchfelde and across the Gawler River. At 11:07 am ACDT the fire was burning under catastrophic weather conditions and an emergency warning was issued for Hillier, Munno Para Downs, Kudla, Munno Para West and Angle Vale. One house was destroyed.

Another emergency warning was issued on 3 January for a fire near Kersbrook. At its largest extent, the warning area overlapped with areas that a few days earlier had been in warnings for the Cudlee Creek fire. Water bombers delivered 21 loads in just over an hour before darkness fell, and 150 firefighters on 25 trucks plus bulk water carriers and earthmoving equipment limited the advance of the fire to 18 hectares (44 acres).

On Kangaroo Island starting in the Flinders Chase National Park, the Ravine bushfire burnt in excess of 15,000 hectares (37,000 acres) and a bushfire emergency warning was issued on 3 January 2020 as the fire advanced towards Vivonne Bay and the town of Parndana was evacuated. On 4 January it was confirmed at least two people died. As of 6 January 2020 approximately 170,000 hectares (420,000 acres), representing about a third of the island, had been burnt. Fires remained burning out of control, with firefighters working to contain and control fires before potentially hot windy weather scheduled for later in the week. Following fire damage to a water treatment plant, residents were asked to conserve water and some water was carted into island towns. There were concerns for the future of threatened wildlife, such as glossy black cockatoos, Kangaroo Island dunnarts, and koalas. Authorities stated that any koalas taken to the mainland for treatment cannot return to the island in case they bring diseases back with them. (Note: Kangaroo Island koalas are free of chlamydia, which affects koalas on the mainland.)

=== Western Australia ===
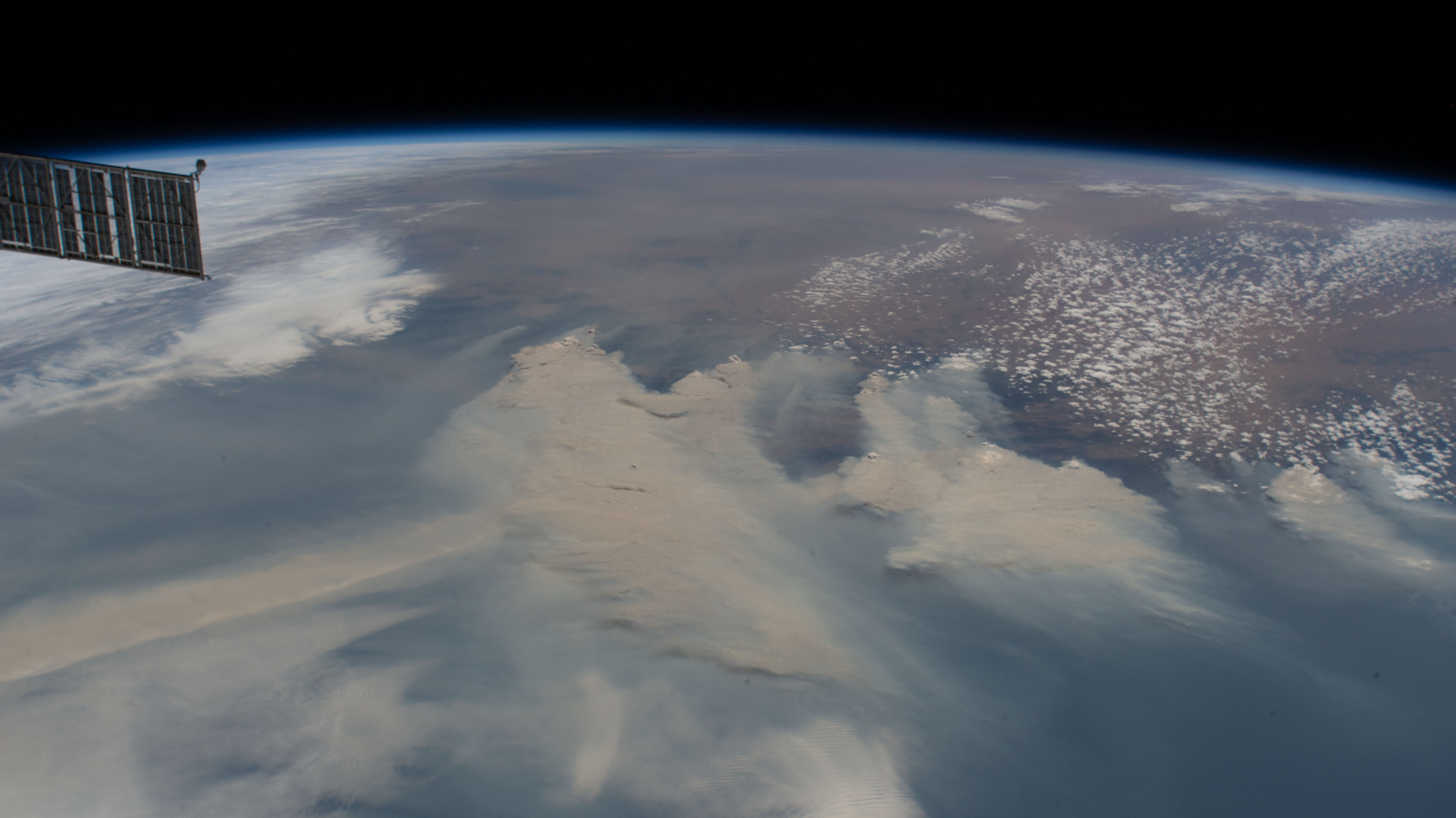
The smoke plume viewed from the International Space Station, 4 January 2020.

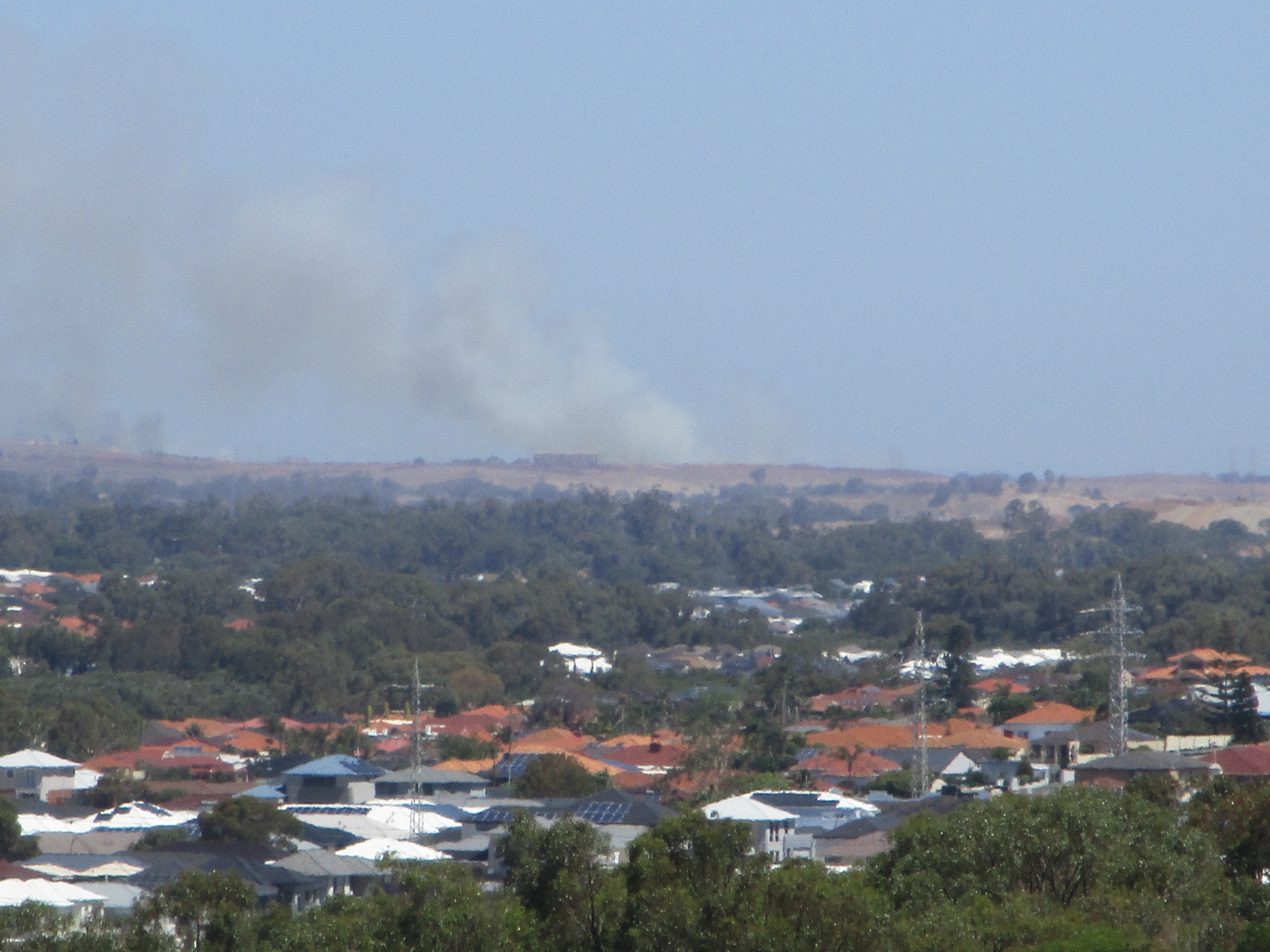
Smoke from bushfires seen in the sky of Perth in November 2019

Two bushfires burnt in Geraldton on 13 November, damaging homes and small structures.

A fire broke out in Yanchep at 2:11 pm on 11 December, immediately triggering an emergency warning for Yanchep and Two Rocks. The fire led to a service station exploding. On 12 December, temperatures in excess of 40 °C (104 °F) exacerbated the fire, and the emergency warning area doubled including parts of Guilderton and Brenton Bay further north. On 13 December, increased temperature conditions resulted in the fire burning in excess of 5,000 hectares (12,000 acres), with the fire front over 1.5 kilometres (0.93 mi) in length. As of 13 December 2019, the emergency warning area stretched from Yanchep north to Lancelin over 40 km (25 mi) away. By 16 December, the fire was considered contained and the alert downgraded to watch and act. Approximately 13,000 hectares (32,000 acres) were burnt; only two buildings were damaged, both within the first day of the fire starting.

In December fires in the region around Norseman blocked access to the Eyre Highway and the Nullarbor and caused the highways of the region to be blocked, so as to prevent any recurrence of the 2007 death of truck drivers on the Great Eastern Highway.

Between 26 December 2019 and 1 January 2020, as a result of a lightning strike, a fire tore through 40,000 hectares (99,000 acres) of land in Stirling Range National Park in the southwest of the state, burning more than half of the park. The pyrocumulus cloud from the fires could be seen 80 km (50 mi) south in Albany. By New Year's Day 2020 a crew of 200 firefighters brought the fire back to advice level without any loss of life or major property damage (a park ranger hut and hiking tracks were destroyed). However, conservationists raised concerns for the potential loss of rare and unique flora and fauna that live in the park, which contains over 1500 such species within its boundaries, including a rare population of quokkas (one of few in mainland Western Australia). A local politician, firefighters, farmers and tourism operators called on Western Australian Emergency Minister Fran Logan to invest in local firefighting assets for the area in order to make sure the tourist destination was properly protected.

=== Tasmania ===
In late October 2019, four bushfires were burning near Scamander, Elderslie and Lachlan. Emergency warnings were issued at Lulworth, Bothwell and Lachlan. A large fire near Swansea also burnt over 4,000 hectares (9,900 acres). Lightning strikes subsequently started multiple fires in Southwest Tasmania. On 20 December 2019, a fire was started in the north east, which spread to 15,000 hectares (37,000 acres) and destroyed one home; a man was charged with starting the fire.

Two fires continued to burn in January 2020. A fire in the Fingal Valley, in north-eastern Tasmania, started on 29 December, and a fire at Pelham, north of Hobart, started on 30 December. As of 16 January 2020 the Fingal fire had burnt over 20,000 hectares (49,000 acres) and the Pelham fire over 2,100 hectares (5,200 acres).

=== Australian Capital Territory ===
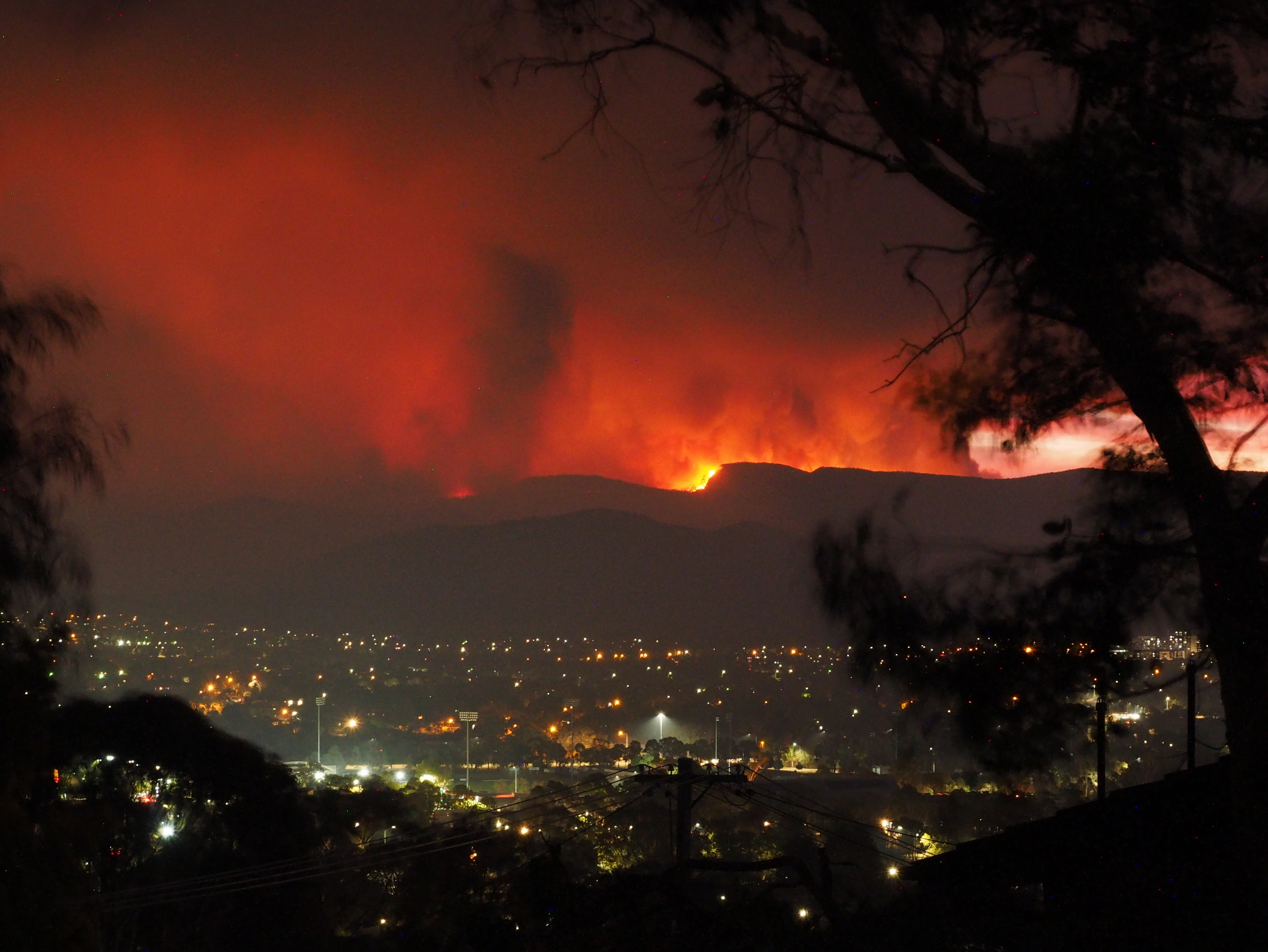
The Orroral Valley Fire viewed from Tuggeranong in southern Canberra

In the Australian Capital Territory (ACT), the national capital Canberra was blanketed by thick bushfire smoke on New Year's Day from bushfires burning nearby in New South Wales. That day the air quality in the capital was the worst of any city in the world, at around 23 times the threshold to be considered hazardous. Conditions continued the next day, and Australia Post stopped postal deliveries in the ACT to keep workers safe from smoke. The first death directly linked to the poor air quality was also recorded on 2 January. An elderly women had been travelling from Brisbane to Canberra by plane, when she exited the plane onto the smoke-flooded tarmac, she suffered respiratory distress and then died. On 2 January 2020, the ACT declared a state of alert; that was extended on 12 January as the merged Dunns Road fire burnt seven kilometres (four miles) from the Territory's south-west border.

From at least 6 January a bushfire near Hospital Hill in the Namadgi National Park had started; it was extinguished on 9 January.

On 22 January a bushfire started in Pialligo Redwood Forest; it reached emergency level threatening Beard and Oaks Estate. The next day a second bushfire started, the Kallaroo Fire, which later during the day merged with the Redwood Forest fire forming the Beard Fire; the fire jumped the Molonglo River and threatened the suburbs of Beard, Harman and Oaks Estate as it burnt 424 hectares (1,050 acres). Canberra Airport was closed for a day. The fire destroyed 1 facility, 4 outbuildings and 3 vehicles.

On 27 January a bushfire in the Orroral Valley in the Namadgi National Park started. ACT Emergency Services Minister Mick Gentleman reported, on behalf of the Department of Defence, that the fire had been started by a landing light on a Defence helicopter, while it was conducting routine aerial reconnaissance and ground clearance work to support local firefighters. By the morning of 28 January the fire had grown to 2,575 hectares in size and was 9 kilometres from the town of Tharwa. An emergency warning was declared for Tharwa and the southern suburbs of Canberra just after 1:30pm AEST on 28 January. Chief Minister Andrew Barr described the fire as the biggest threat to Canberra since the 2003 Canberra bushfires.

=== Northern Territory ===
The Northern Territory went through a relatively average annual bushfire season with respect to area of land burnt, in comparison to the scale of bushfires witnessed in other areas of Australia. Despite this, approximately 6.8 million hectares (17 million acres) was burnt, an area which contributed significantly to the total area burnt by bushfires in the nation. Five homes were lost to bushfires in the Territory.

== Precedents ==
While the full extent of the current bushfires is yet to be measured, there have been a number of large scale bushfires recorded in Australian history. The widespread 1938-9 fires in Victoria, NSW, South Australia and the ACT similarly gained international headlines when the fires entered the Sydney suburbs, as did the 1994 eastern seaboard fires. The 1851 Black Thursday bushfires shocked colonial Australia with their ferocity, burning a quarter of what is now Victoria (around five million hectares). Lesser known is that about 117 million hectares, or 15 per cent of Australia's land mass, experienced fire in the summer of 1974–5. NSW was again badly affected, and three people killed, however the fires were mainly in sparsely populated inland areas. The five most deadly blazes were: Black Saturday 2009 in Victoria (173 people killed, 2000 homes lost); Ash Wednesday 1983 in Victoria and South Australia (75 dead, nearly 1900 homes); Black Friday 1939 in Victoria (71 dead, 650 houses destroyed), Black Tuesday 1967 in Tasmania (62 people and almost 1300 homes); and the Gippsland fires and Black Sunday of 1926 in Victoria (60 people killed over a two-month period).

== Environmental effects ==
In mid-December 2019, a NASA analysis revealed that since 1 August, the New South Wales and Queensland bushfires had emitted 250 million tonnes (280 million short tons) of carbon dioxide (CO_{2}). As of 2 January 2020, NASA estimated that 306 million tonnes (337 million short tons) of CO_{2} had been emitted. By comparison, in 2018, Australia's total carbon emissions were equivalent to 535 million tonnes (590 million short tons) of CO_{2}. While the carbon emitted by the fires would normally be reabsorbed by forest regrowth, this would take decades and might not happen at all if prolonged drought has damaged the ability of forests to fully regrow.

In December 2019, the air quality index (AQI) around Rozelle, a west suburb of Sydney, hit 2,552 or more than 12 times the hazardous level of 200. The level of fine particle matters, known and measured globally as PM2.5, around Sydney was also measured at 734 micrograms (0.01133 gr) or the equivalent of 37 cigarettes. On 1 January 2020, the AQI around Monash, a suburb of Canberra, was measured at 4,650, or more than 23 times hazardous level and peaked at 7,700.

On New Year's Day 2020 in New Zealand, a blanket of smoke from the Australian fires covered the whole South Island, giving the sky an orange-yellow haze. People in Dunedin reported smelling smoke in the air. The MetService stated that the smoke would not have any adverse affects on the weather or temperature in the country. The smoke moved over the North Island the following day, but began breaking up and was less intense than over the South Island the previous day; meanwhile, South Pacific winds dissipated the smoke over the South Island. The smoke affected glaciers in the country, giving a brown tint to the snow. On 5 January 2020, more smoke wafted over the North Island, turning the sky in Auckland orange. By 7 January 2020, the smoke was carried approximately 11,000 kilometres (6,800 mi) across the South Pacific Ocean to Chile, Argentina, Brazil, and Uruguay.

CO emitted by 2019-20 south-east bushfire captured by NASA Aqua AIRS instrument

The fires resulted in agricultural losses of over AUD 5 billion, destroying livestock, crops, wildlife and agricultural infrastructure across vast areas.

== Ecological effects ==
Prof. Chris Dickman, a fellow of the Australian Academy of Science from the University of Sydney, estimated on 8 January 2020 that more than one billion animals were killed by bushfires in Australia; while more than 800 million animals perished in New South Wales. The estimate was based on a 2007 World Wide Fund for Nature (WWF) report on impacts of land clearing on Australian wildlife in New South Wales that provided estimates of mammal, bird and reptile population density in the region. Dickman's calculation had been based on highly conservative estimates and the actual mortality would therefore be higher. The figure provided by Dickman included mammals (excluding bats), birds, and reptiles; and did not include frogs, insects, or other invertebrates. Other estimates, which include animals like bats, amphibians and invertebrates, also put the number killed at over a billion.

Ecologists feared some endangered species were driven to extinction by the fires. Though bushfires are not uncommon in Australia, they are usually of lower scale and intensity that only affect small parts of the overall distribution of where species live. Animals that survived a bushfire could still find suitable habitats in the immediate vicinity, which was not the case when an entire distribution is decimated in an intense event. Besides immediate mortality from the fires, there were on-going mortalities after the fires from starvation, lack of shelter, and attacks from predators such as foxes and cats that are attracted to fire-affected areas to hunt. The 2019–2020 wildfires had a severe impact on the extinction risk of Australian avifauna, causing approximately half of the overall reduction in the national Red List Index (RLI) for birds between 2010 and 2020.

On Kangaroo Island, Australia's third largest island and known as Australia's "Galapagos Island", a third of the island was burnt. Large parts of the island are designated as protected areas and host animals such as sea lions, penguins, kangaroos, koalas, pygmy possums, southern brown bandicoots, Ligurian bees, Kangaroo Island dunnarts and various birds including glossy black cockatoos. NASA estimated that the number of dead koalas could be as high as 25,000 or about half the total population of the species on the island. A quarter of the beehives of the Ligurian honey bees that inhabited the Island were believed to have been destroyed. Both the Kangaroo Island dunnart and Kangaroo Island subspecies of the glossy black cockatoo are endangered and are only found on Kangaroo Island. Before the fires, there were only less than 500 Kangaroo Island dunnarts and about 380 Kangaroo Island glossy black cockatoos. On continental islands, much of the decline in bird species survival was driven by these fires on Kangaroo Island, which led to 16 of its 17 endemic or near-endemic avian taxa being moved to a higher extinction risk category.

Australian magpies, which are known to have the ability to mimic the calls of other birds and animals, were so frequently exposed to the sirens from fire trucks and ambulances caused by the bushfires that a magpie in Newcastle was captured on video mimicking the sound of emergency sirens.

== Domestic response ==
=== New South Wales ===
The two primary firefighting agencies for New South Wales, Fire and Rescue NSW and the NSW Rural Fire Service, formed the bulk of the primary response to the fires, mobilising thousands of firefighters and several hundred firefighting vehicles. They were heavily supported by the NSW National Parks and Wildlife Service and the Forestry Corporation of NSW, who hold jurisdiction over national parks and forests across the state. Additional local firefighting resources were also utilised from agencies such as Air Services Australia and Sydney Trains.

Numerous interstate agencies deployed firefighting resources into New South Wales, including several hundred firefighters from the Victorian Country Fire Authority, along with crews from the Melbourne Metropolitan Fire Brigade, the South Australian Country Fire Service, the South Australian Metropolitan Fire Service, the South Australian Department of Environment and Water, and the Queensland Fire and Emergency Service.

Despite substantial loss of life and property, firefighters were able to save in excess of 30,100 homes, outbuildings and other facilities in addition to countless lives.

Multiple other New South Wales emergency services assisted in the response, including NSW Ambulance that provided ongoing pre-hospital care to victims of the fires including firefighters, NSW Police that worked to ensure public safety was maintained through road closures and evacuations and the NSW State Emergency Service that assisted with logistical support. With brush-tailed rock-wallabies and much of the indigenous wildlife population in parts of New South Wales were left without food or water, the NSW National Parks and Wildlife Service airdropped approximately 1,800 kilograms (4,000 lb) vegetables on the known habitats. A joint operation by the NSW National Parks and Wildlife Service and NSW Rural Fire Service was mounted to protect the critically endangered Wollemia pines growing in Wollemi National Park. Fire retardant was dropped from air tankers, and an irrigation system was installed on the ground by specialist firefighters, who were lowered into the area by winches from helicopters.

=== Commonwealth ===
On 24 December 2019, the Morrison Government announced that volunteer firefighters employed in the Commonwealth public service would be offered at least 20 working days paid leave. On 29 December 2019, it announced that volunteer firefighters who have been called out for more than 10 days would be able to receive financial compensation. On 4 January 2020, it announced that it would lease four waterbombing planes including two long-range DC-10s and two medium-range for use by state and territory governments.

On 5 January 2020, the Prime Minister announced the establishment of the National Bushfire Recovery Agency, funded initially with A$2 billion, under the control of former Australian Federal Police Commissioner, Andrew Colvin.

=== Military ===
On 5 December 2019, the Australian Defence Force (ADF) commenced Operation Bushfire Assist to support state fire services in logistics, planning, capability, and operational support. Activities the ADF has undertaken as part of the Operation have included Air Force aircraft transporting firefighters and their equipment interstate, Army and Navy helicopters transporting firefighters, conducting night fire mapping, impact assessments and search and rescue flights, use of various defence facilities as coordination and information centres and for catering and accommodation for firefighters, liaison between state and federal government services, reloading and refuelling for waterbombing aircraft, deployment of personnel to assess fire damage and severity, and provision of humanitarian supplies.

On 31 December 2019, the Defence Minister announced the ADF would provide assistance to East Gippsland, in particular the isolated high-fire-risk town of Mallacoota, deploying helicopters including a CH-47 Chinook and C-27J Spartan military transport aircraft to be based at RAAF Base East Sale and two naval vessels, HMAS Choules and MV Sycamore, with the vessels also able to assist in south-east New South Wales if required. On 1 January 2020, the ADF deployed additional military staff establishing the Victorian Joint Task Force 646 (Army Reserve 4th Brigade) and the following day the New South Wales Joint Task Force 1110 (Army Reserve 5th Brigade). On 3 January 2020, HMAS Choules and MV Sycamore evacuated civilians from Mallacoota bound for Westernport.

On 4 January 2020, following a meeting of the National Security Committee, the Morrison Government announced a compulsory call-out of Army Reserve brigades to deploy up to 3,000 reserve personnel full-time to assist with in the Operation. Additionally, Defence announced that it would deploy HMAS Adelaide to support other Navy ships in evacuations and relief, as well additional Chinook helicopters and military transport aircraft to RAAF Base East Sale. The same day, Chinook helicopters evacuated civilians from Omeo; and Spartan aircraft evacuated civilians from Mallacoota on 5 January.

=== Community organisations ===
The response of volunteer organisations and charities was also considerable, with WIRES Wildlife Rescue working to rescue and treat injured wildlife, Rapid Relief Team Australia raising money for victims, providing meals for firefighters and assisting with two bulk water tankers, Team Rubicon Australia providing debris removal and helping with the cleanup of fire affected areas, the Animal Welfare League fundraising and assisting injured animals, and St John Ambulance Australia and Australian Red Cross providing support at evacuation centres across New South Wales.

On 1 December 2019 WWF-Australia launched the "Towards Two Billion Trees" plan to aid the koala bushfire recovery. It aims to stop excessive tree-clearing, protect the existing trees and forests, and restore native habitat that has been lost. The ten-point plan for the next ten years foresees to grow 1.56 billion new trees and save 780 million trees.

== International response ==
Political figures from outside Australia including Donald Trump, Cory Booker, Hillary Clinton, Al Gore, Bernie Sanders, Greta Thunberg, and Elizabeth Warren all publicly commented about the fires. People in the entertainment industry such as Tina Arena, Patricia Arquette, Cate Blanchett, Russell Crowe, Ellen DeGeneres, Selena Gomez, Halsey, Nicole Kidman, Lizzo, Bette Midler, Pink, Margot Robbie, Paul Stanley, Jay Park, Jonathan Van Ness, and Phoebe Waller-Bridge also made statements about the fires. Some of the aforementioned people have also donated or raised funds.

On 4 January 2020, Queen Elizabeth and the Duke of Edinburgh sent a message of condolence to Governor-General David Hurley, sending their "thoughts and prayers to all Australians at this difficult time". The Queen indicated in her message that she was "deeply saddened" to hear of the fires and their devastating impact on the country, and expressed her thanks to emergency service workers. On 8 January 2020, Prince Charles issued a video message expressing his despair at the "appalling horror" of the fires. The Duke and Duchess of Cambridge and the Duke and Duchess of Sussex also issued messages to Australia, Princess Mary of Denmark, who was born and raised in Tasmania, published an open letter where she and her husband, Crown Prince Frederik, expressed their condolences to the victims and respect for the firefighters.

=== International aid ===
Canada

Four deployments totalling 87 Canadian firefighters were sent through the Canadian Interagency Forest Fire Centre. It was the first time since 2009 that Canadian personnel were deployed to Australia. The Canadian government also sent a CC-17 plane of the Royal Canadian Air Force with 15 personnel on 27 January to further aid with transport and provide airlift support.

Fiji

The government of Fiji deployed the Fiji Military Forces humanitarian assistance and disaster relief platoon and engineers to assist in the bush fire rehabilitation.

France

On 6 January, French President Emmanuel Macron stated he could help out with the bushfires. A team of five French firefighting experts arrived in Australia on 9 January in order to determine possible options for French and European support.

Japan

On 15 January, the Japanese government sent two C-130 aircraft of the JASDF, along with 70 other Self-Defense Force personnel to assist in transport and other efforts in combating the bushfires. The aircraft left Komaki Air Base and flew to RAAF Base Richmond in New South Wales the next day.

Malaysia

On 5 January, Malaysia offered its assistance through a statement by Deputy Prime Minister Wan Azizah Wan Ismail. On 13 January, Malaysia officially deployed over forty firefighters to assist with the bushfires. Twenty others from government agencies would also be involved with the mission.

New Zealand

Over fifty New Zealanders were deployed to Australia in both direct fire fighting and support roles. In January 2020, New Zealand also deployed elements of the Royal New Zealand Air Force and New Zealand Army including three NH90 helicopters, two Army combat engineer sections, and a command element. A specialist six person animal disaster response team were deployed by non-profit Animal Evac New Zealand on 8 January to New South Wales, assisting with wildlife rescue and supported by SAFE. The team was the first international specialist animal rescuers to arrive and included vets, animal management officers as well as animal disaster and technical animal rescue experts. A second team of four arrived on 13 January. The teams partnered with local wildlife centres to successfully rescue and relocate several injured animals. as well as advising residents in fire danger zones on their animal evacuation plans.

Papua New Guinea

The Government of Papua New Guinea offered to send 1,000 military and other personnel to Australia to assist with the response to the bushfires. Australia accepted 100 Papua New Guinea Defence Force personnel.

The Philippines

The Philippine Red Cross pledged to donate $100K to Australia, while various Filipino personalities pledged support for the victims of the bush fires. The women-led Teduray people of Maguindanao initiated a sacred rain-making ritual for Australian victims, calling on the fire goddess Frayag Sarif's intercession to bring rain to the country.

Singapore

Singapore deployed two Chinook helicopters and 42 Singapore Armed Forces personnel stationed at Oakey Army Aviation Centre to RAAF Base East Sale in Victoria.

United Arab Emirates

The United Arab Emirates sent 200 volunteers from the Emirates Red Crescent to help fight the fire, including Emirati astronaut Sultan Al Neyadi. A Twitter campaign and hashtag #mateshelpmates was launched by the Dubai Expo 2020 aiming to raise donations to help those affected by the fires in Australia. To increase awareness, Burj Khalifa in Dubai, the world's tallest tower, lit up in solidarity with Australia.

United States

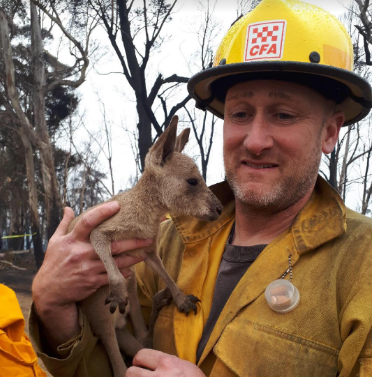
A Huron–Manistee National Forests employee, on secondment to Australia, holds a kangaroo joey.

Twenty firefighters from the United States Department of the Interior were deployed to Australia to help combat the fires. Fire fighters from other parts of the US also helped with the fires. On 23 January, three US firefighters died in the crash of a C-130 fire fighting aircraft.

Other countries

Several other countries have offered assistance:

- On 7 January, Denmark offered 50 firefighters via the Danish Emergency Management Agency that were on a standby and could move on a short notice, but it was deemed unnecessary by the Australian Government, which at that point said that they had sufficient material, manpower and organisation to deal with the remaining fires.
- On 6 January 2020, the Romanian Ministry of Internal Affairs responded to the Civil Protection Mechanism (EUCPM) and prepared 70 firefighters to be deployed in Australia through the Emergency Response Coordination Centre (ERCC) of the European Union. Australia rejected this, as well as the EU call for more bushfire help.
- Turkish Foreign Minister Mevlüt Çavuşoğlu tweeted that Turkey is ready to provide all required assistance, while Turkey's Melbourne consulate donated $14,500 to Queensland Fire and Emergency Services.
- The Foreign Ministry of Ukraine notified Australia that the Ukrainian government is ready to send 200 seasoned firefighters to help fight the fires. Ukraine's Foreign Minister also noted that "The fires in Australia have not left the Ukrainians indifferent."
- Some Pacific nations have also stated that they could send some aid.

== Causes ==
Australia is one of the most fire-prone continents on earth, and bushfires form part of the natural cycle of its landscapes. However, factors such as climate trends, weather patterns and vegetation management by humans can all contribute to the intensity of bushfire seasons, and the most destructive fires in Australian history have usually been preceded by extreme high temperatures, low relative humidity and strong winds, which combine to create ideal conditions for the rapid spread of fire. Scientific experts and land management agencies agree that severely below average fuel moisture attributed to record-breaking temperatures and drought, accompanied by severe fire weather, are the primary causes of the 2019–20 Australian bushfire season, and that these are likely to have been exacerbated by long-term trends of warmer and dryer weather observed over the Australian continent. Nonetheless, the political nature of many of the crisis and its associated issues has also resulted in the circulation of large amounts of disinformation regarding the causes of the fire activity, at the neglect of credible scientific research, expert opinion, and previous government inquiries.

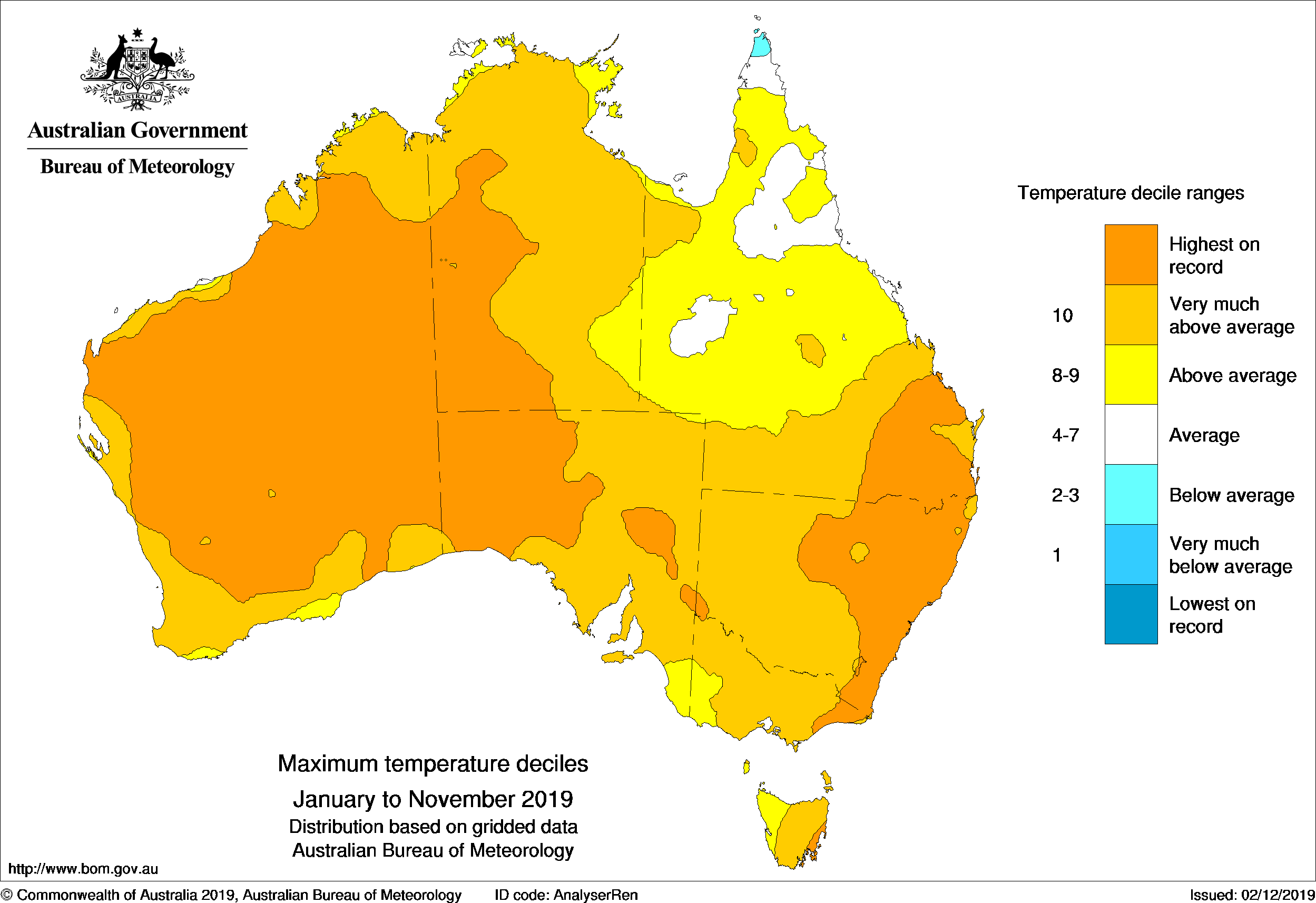
Maximum temperature deciles, January to November 2019

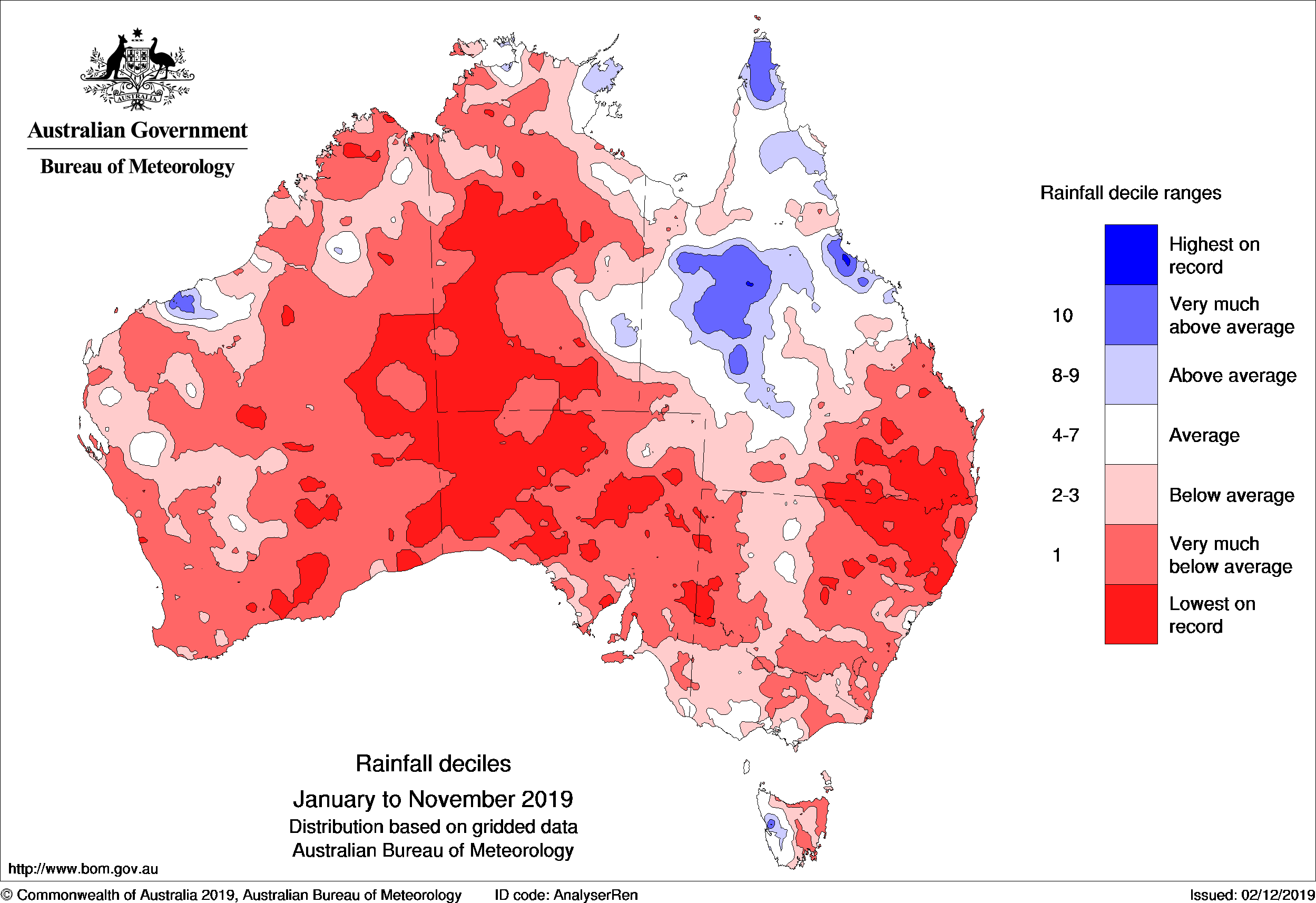
Rainfall deciles, January to November 2019

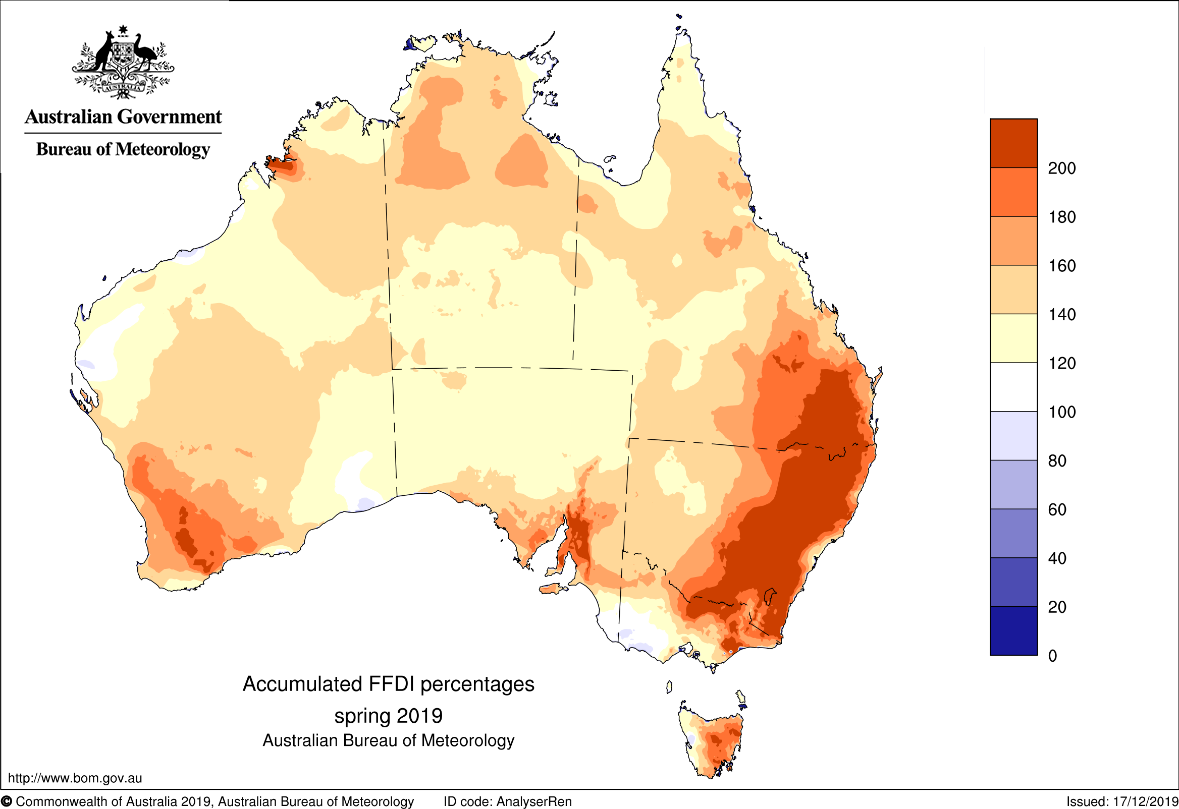
FFDI (Forest Fire Danger Index), Spring 2019

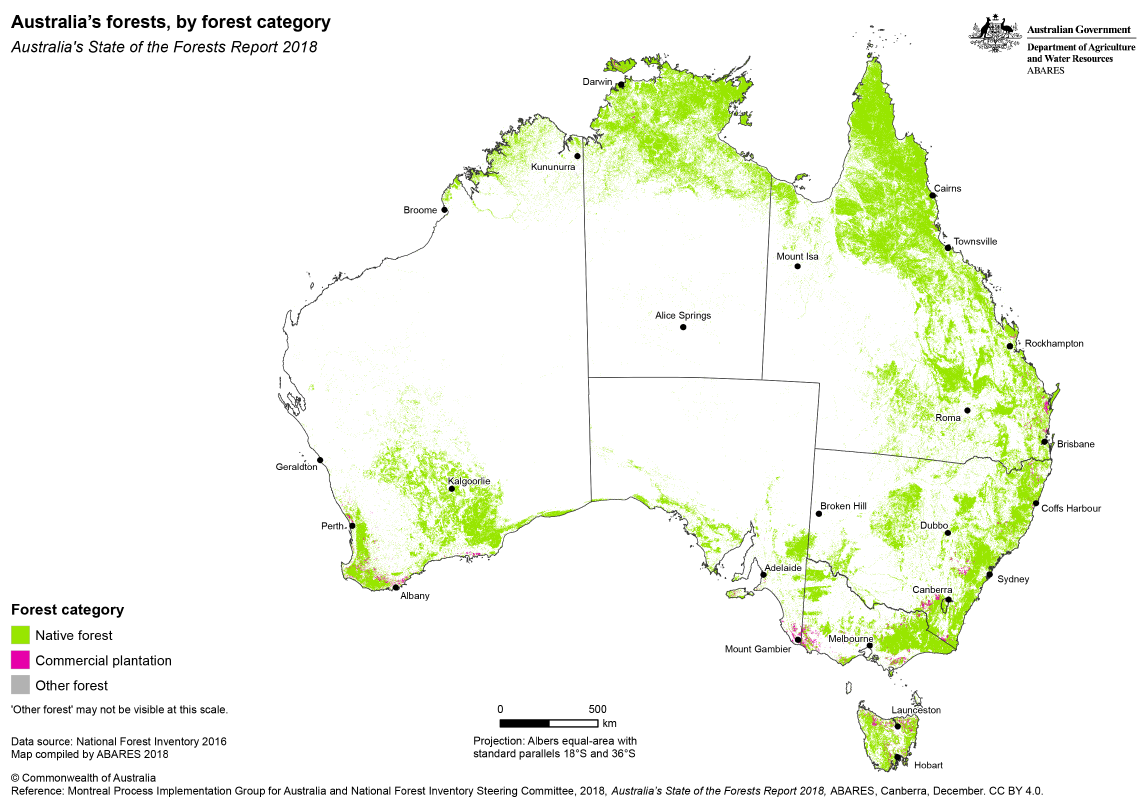
Distribution of Australian Forests 2016

=== Ignition ===
The major cause of ignition of fires during the 2019–20 fire crisis in NSW and Victoria is reported to be lightning strikes. According to the ABC, arson has been of little impact – accounting for around 1% of NSW blazes and 0.3% of Victorian blazes by 18 January 2020.

=== Drought and temperature ===
A likely contributor to the bushfire crisis was the ongoing drought in eastern Australia – the most severe on record for some fire affected areas. Exacerbating the effects of diminished rainfall in this drought has been a record breaking run of above average monthly temperatures, lasting 36 months to October 2019. The combination of heat and drought caused critical low fuel moisture content, with Victoria Country Fire Authority Response Controller Gavin Freeman stating that the "underlying dryness" of the bush has led to exceptionally high fire danger. Although Australia has naturally experienced high rainfall variability and hot summers for millennia, the country has experienced an increase of nearly 1.0 °C (1.8 °F) in average annual temperatures since 1900, decreases in average rainfall in southeastern Australia since 1990, with the country's worst recorded droughts occurring within the 21st century. The Commonwealth Scientific and Industrial Research Organisation (CSIRO) stated that on account of projected future climate change, hot days will become more frequent and hotter (very high confidence), and the time in drought is projected to increase over southern Australia (high confidence). In October 2019 David Littleproud, the Australian Minister for Water Resources, stated that he "totally accepts" the link between climate change and drought in Australia, as someone who has experienced it first hand.

=== Climate change ===
Climate and fire experts agree that climate change is a factor known to result in increased fire frequency and intensity in south east Australia, and although it should not be considered as the sole cause of the 2019–20 Australian fires, climate change is considered very likely to have contributed to the unprecedented extent and severity of the fires. The crisis has led to calls for more action to combat climate change. In December 2019, Australia had been ranked worst in terms of policy, and sixth worst overall, out of 57 countries assessed on the Climate Change Performance Index, with the Morrison government labelled "an increasingly regressive force." Originally downplaying the role of climate change in causing the fires, Prime Minister Morrison eventually conceded that climate change was one of "many factors" involved and added that Australia was "playing its part" in the international effort against climate change. That said, the Morrison government has received some criticism on its 2030 emission reduction targets. Several members of the governing Liberal Party were criticised internationally for climate change denial, with backbencher Craig Kelly called "disgraceful" during an interview with the hosts of Good Morning Britain for denying any link between climate change and the fires, and the Israeli Public Broadcasting Corporation receiving "angry" feedback from listeners after airing an interview in which former Liberal prime minister Tony Abbott said the world was "in the grip of a climate cult." Prior to the worst phases of the bushfires, in an interview in November 2019, former Liberal prime minister Malcolm Turnbull said the party had struggled with the issue of climate change denial for more than a decade because it had become an issue of "identity" rather than fact, and criticised News Corporation for being a "long-time promoter" of climate denialism. The chief executive of the Council of Small Business Organisations Australia said bushfire preparations had been "stymied" by the federal government, because "there are people within government who firmly believe there is no such thing as climate change or that human beings don't have an impact upon it, and they are adamant that no extra work or extra effort should ever happen because they don't believe in climate change."

=== Disputed causes ===
In the midst of the crisis, conservative politicians and media blamed a lack of prescribed burning and fire break management, although such assertion has subsequently been heavily criticized and disproven by scientific experts. Accompanying this was the assertion that environmental groups were responsible for the crisis by inhibiting prescribed burning, despite environmental groups holding relatively negligible political power compared to the Liberal and National parties. Furthermore, the amount of prescribed burning in southeastern Australia has been stated to have increased in recent years, following the recommendation for increased prescribed burning from the 2009 Black Saturday Royal Commission. Experts suggested that prescribed burning has been more difficult to achieve given recent trends towards warmer and dryer conditions. Experts have also cast skepticism on the effectiveness of fuel reduction treatments, citing research that suggests that prescribed burning does little to stop bushfire and save property in south east Australia, with climate and weather conditions having primary influence.

The effect of previous prescribed burns in slowing the 2019-20 Australian fires and assisting fire suppression efforts remains unclear, although in many instances the fires were observed to burn through cleared agricultural land and forest recently affected by unplanned and prescribed burns, owing to the extreme weather conditions and dryness of vegetation. Of particular note, the damaging Currowan fire burnt though a large area of Morton National Park subject in 2017 to one of the largest prescribed burns ever successfully conducted in NSW. In relation to the blame of prescribed burning, Professor of Pyrogeography and Fire Science David Bowman stated "These are very tired and very old conspiracy theories that get a run after most major fires," and that they were "an obvious attempt to deflect the conversation away from climate change." In the lead up to another Federal inquiry into state land management, Professor of Bushfire Behaviour and Management Trent Penman added "If there was a silver bullet on bushfires we'd have found it by now, after the 51 [bushfire] inquiries since 1939," and that "blindly putting money into prescribed burning won't stop the problem". Despite evidence to suggest that fuel loads played a minimal role in the 2019-20 Australian fires, there are calls to open up Australian protected lands to industry, particularly logging and grazing, to reduce fire fuel, with these calls having so far mainly stemmed from individuals and businesses with interests in such industries, and have resulted in the circulation of large amounts of disinformation.

The NSW Rural Fire Service referred numerous individuals to the NSW Police; 24 people were charged with arson, allegedly starting bushfires. Approximately one percent of the land burnt in NSW, and 0.03 percent in Victoria, was attributed to arson. Queensland police reported that 114 fires "were found to be deliberately or maliciously lit".

=== Disinformation and contested reporting ===
Incorrect reporting and social media claims about the extent of the fires, its precedents and causes, and matters like funding of fire fighting services have been circulated during the fire season. Media outlets of differing political allegiances have also disputed each other's coverage.

Misleading maps and graphics

A number of maps giving an exaggerated impression of Australia's fires have gone viral online, and have been published by major news outlets. It was reported by news.com.au that "Some bushfire maps have been criticised for misleading people about the location and size of the fires, with a map used by the ABC in the US appearing to show the entire east coast of Australia on fire, as well as a strange line of fires through the centre of the country... " One image created by Anthony Hearsey spread widely on Twitter and by celebrities including Rihanna was wrongly interpreted as a map showing the live extent of fires, when in fact it sought to present one month of data of locations where fire was detected, according to NASA's Fire Information for Resource Management System. Maps showing "hotspots" were spread online as comprehensive fire maps, giving an exaggerated impression of the extent of fires. Photographs of previous Australian bushfires were also being wrongly published as current. and maps that exaggerate the extent of the fires, or include both past and present fires.

Exaggerated extent of arson

The Guardian newspaper wrote that "Bot and troll accounts are involved in a 'disinformation campaign' exaggerating the role of arson in Australia's bushfire disaster, social media analysis suggests... The false claims are, in some cases, used to undermine the link between the current bushfires and the longer, more intense fire seasons brought about by climate change." The report cited a study by Queensland University of Technology senior lecturer on social network analysis Dr Timothy Graham, who examined content published on the #arsonemergency hashtag on Twitter. Giovanni Torre wrote for The Telegraph that "Australia's bushfire crisis has led to what appears to be a deliberate misinformation campaign started by climate-change deniers claiming arson is the primary cause of the ongoing fires... Social media accounts, including Donald Trump Jr's Twitter account, circulated the false claim that 183 people had been arrested for arson during the Australian fire crisis..." An opinion piece for The Conversation website stated "In the first week of 2020, hashtag #ArsonEmergency became the focal point of a new online narrative surrounding the bushfire crisis. The message: the cause is arson, not climate change. Police and bushfire services (and some journalists) have contradicted this claim [...] We've observed both troll and bot accounts spouting disinformation regarding the bushfires on Twitter." The article also argued that a disinformation was underway to downplay the role of climate change in causing the fires. The vice.com website wrote "Research conducted by the Queensland University of Technology showed that Twitter accounts with the characteristics of bots or trolls were spreading disinformation about the responsibility of arsonists and Greens." The Guardian accused News Corp of furthering arson disinformation.

Funding for the Rural Fire Service

Incorrect reports were disseminated that the New South Wales Government, led by Premier Gladys Berejiklian, had cut funding to fire services. NSW Rural Fire Service Commissioner Shane Fitzsimmons, in response to the funding cut claims, stated "that it is rubbish, it is misinformation, it's being misrepresented and I think it is disgracefully being misrepresented here today". He also stated that "not only has our budget not been cut, we are enjoying record budgets. We have got more money today than we have ever had before in the history of the organisation". Debate and controversy continue to surround previous funding cuts to fire management agencies, with other reports noting recent funding cuts to the National Parks and Wildlife Service, which is responsible for the planning and enforcement of prescribed burns in NSW national parks.

Hazard reduction activities

The Guardian newspaper has disputed claims that Greens have blocked hazard reduction, writing: "Despite the evidence a claim persists that a major contributing factor of Australia's devastating fire season... is not climate change but a conspiracy by environmentalists to 'lock up' national parks and prevent hazard reduction activities such as prescribed burning and clearing of the forest floor".

Other false reports

- Fires would clear land to benefit a high-speed rail project.
- ISIS was somehow responsible or involved.
- The fires were a false flag operation deliberately lit by climate change activists.

== Political response ==
Ongoing political and social debate has surrounded many aspects of the 2019–20 Australian fire crisis, particularly regarding the causes and future prevention of such fire activity, and the role of climate change. Amid a conservative government that has received noted criticism for its climate change inaction and support for fossil fuel industries, growing acknowledgement within the nation's politics and society of the issue of climate change in Australia resulted in a highly political agenda to the crisis response. The governing Liberal and National parties, accompanied by numerous news outlets associated with climate change denial, firmly deflected responsibility away from the record-breaking drought affecting the country and its associated links to climate change observations and projections. Conversely, scientific experts have asserted the influence of climate change, drought, prolonged fire weather, and contextualized the limited role of prescribed burning and arson in influencing the crisis. The political and social response to the crisis has been marked notably by political blame shifting, the circulation of large amounts of disinformation, and political disregard for scientific research, expert opinion, and previous government inquiries.

=== Criticism ===
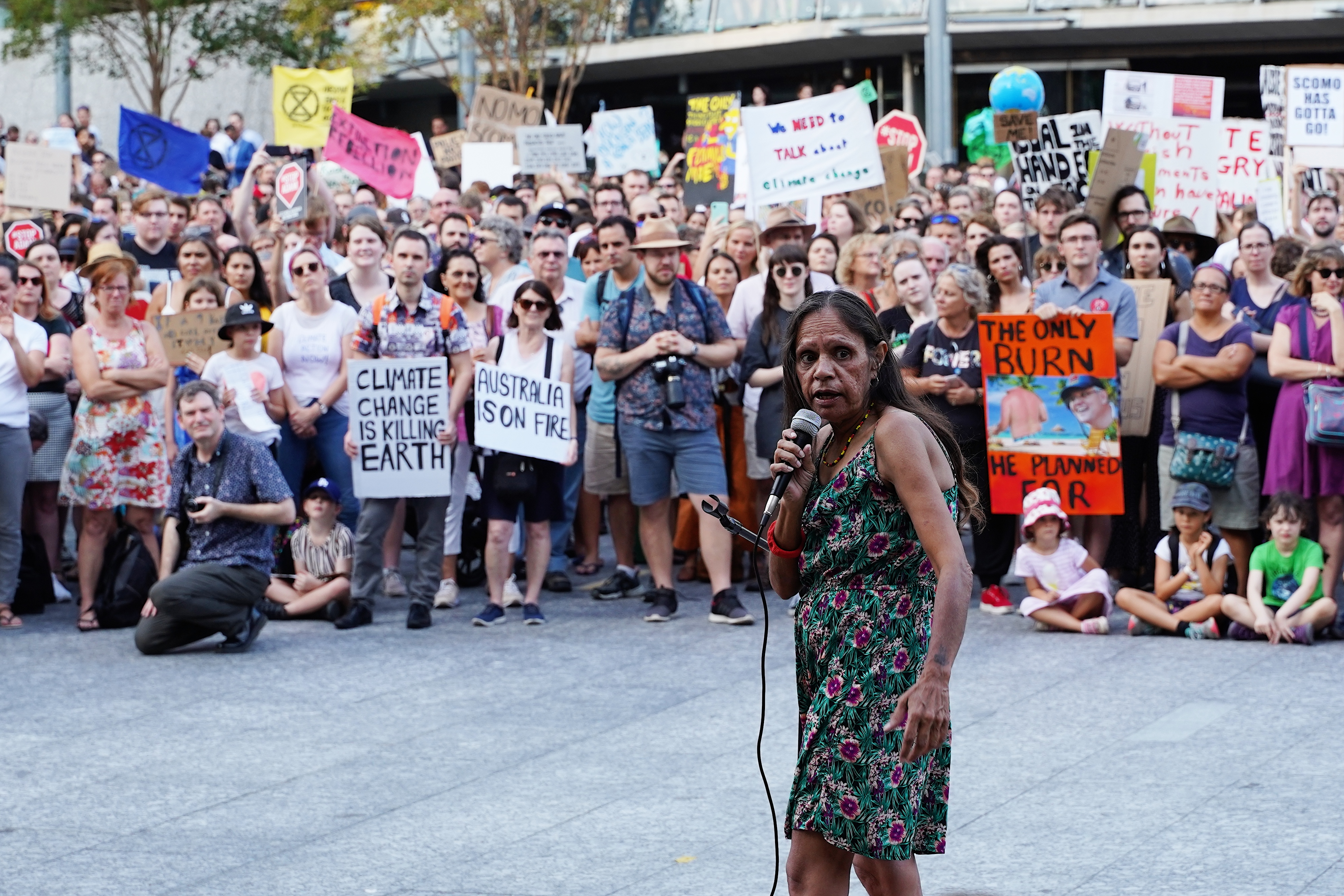
A protest in Brisbane held in response to the bushfires

Further controversy has surrounded Prime Minister Scott Morrison for taking an overseas family holiday to Hawaiʻi, during the bushfires. These criticisms also applied to New South Wales Minister for Emergency Services David Elliot, who went for a holiday in Europe. Queensland Premier Annastacia Palaszczuk was also criticised for holidaying on a cruise ship while fires were active in the state.

While travelling throughout fire-affected towns in New South Wales, Morrison was filmed attempting to shake the hands of two residents in Cobargo who had refused to shake his outstretched hand. Morrison was criticised for grabbing and then shaking their hands despite their refusals. In an interview with Andrew Constance, NSW Liberal MP for Bega, Constance described the incident stating "the locals probably gave him the welcome he probably deserved". Morrison did not appear concerned with the criticism, later stating, "people are angry, and if people want to direct that at me, that is up to them".

On 4 January, volunteer firefighter Paul Parker, from Nelligen, rose to fame after he stopped his firetruck next to a Channel 7 news crew, and used colourful language to denounce what he perceived as an inadequate response by Morrison.
The video became viral over the following days.

Soon after, Morrison released a video on behalf of the Liberal Party regarding deployment of military assets to respond to the bushfire crisis, for which he was widely criticised. The video was perceived as an inappropriate and an untimely political advertisement, with former ABC broadcaster Barrie Cassidy calling it "absolutely obscene," journalist Peter van Onselen saying it was "beyond inappropriate", and British political commentator Piers Morgan characterising it as "one of the most tone-deaf things I've ever seen a country's leader put out during a crisis." The Australian Defence Association, a public-interest watchdog dealing with defence issues, said the video was "milking ADF support to civil agencies fighting bushfires" and was a "clear breach of the (reciprocal) non-partisanship convention applying to both the ADF & Ministers/MPs." NSW Rural Fire Service Commissioner Fitzsimmons said it was "disappointing" to learn of the announcement of military assistance from the media and not the government directly. Morrison was further criticised for a "donate" button on a Liberal Party website page which misleadingly led to a donations page for the Liberal Party itself, rather than bushfire relief; the button was later removed.

== Donations ==
Philanthropists, corporate organisations, celebrities, and sportspeople donated to various fundraising appeals for bushfire victims and firefighters; estimated to total A$500 million as of 19 January 2020. Following a representative sample, a report issued by the Fundraising Institute of Australia estimated that 53 percent of all adult Australians donated to a bushfire appeal.

Andrew Forrest and his wife, Nicola, donated A$70 million; and the Paul Ramsay Foundation donated A$30 million. In November, James Packer pledged A$1 million to support the NSWRFS. As the impact of the bushfire season spread, the Crown Resorts Foundation and the Packer Family Foundation pledged a further A$4 million to volunteer fire services in NSW, Victoria and Western Australia – all states in which Crown has resorts. The Murdoch family donated A$5 million; the Micky and Madeleine Arison Family Foundation, A$1.5 million; and donations of A$1 million each were received from the Pratt Foundation, John and Pauline Gandel, Mike Cannon-Brookes, Scott Farquhar, and the Haines and the Perich families. Justin Hemmes donated A$500,000.

Corporate organisations to make donations or pledges included the Seven Group and Kerry Stokes' private investment firm, ACE Capital Equity, a combined total of A$10 million; Tim Cook from Apple, an undisclosed amount; the National Australia Bank and News Corp Australia, A$5 million each; Coles Group, A$4 million (of which A$3 million was in gift cards); the Australian Football League, A$2.5 million; BHP, A$2 million; Westpac and Woolworths, A$1.5 million each; Facebook, A$1.25 million; and Amazon, the ANZ Bank, the Atlassian Foundation, the Commonwealth Bank, (Note: Also see A$1 million purchase of Shane Warne's baggy green.) Orica, Qantas, and Rio Tinto, A$1 million each; and Canva and the San Diego Zoo, A$500,000 each.

Leonardo DiCaprio donated US$3 million (A$3.4 million) via Earth Alliance; Kylie Jenner, US$1 million; Ellen DeGeneres, A$1.5 million; and donations of A$1 million were received from Sir Elton John and Chris Hemsworth and family. Pink donated US$500,000 (A$720,000), tweeting that she is "totally devastated watching what is happening in Australia right now." Metallica donated A$750,000; and donations of A$500,000 were received from Nicole Kidman and her Ex husband, Keith Urban, Kylie and Danii Minogue and their family, and Bette Midler. The Wiggles performed a concert on 17 and 18 January, and on 16 February at Stadium Australia in Sydney, the Fire Fight Australia concert will feature local and international acts.

Tennis players, led by Nick Kyrgios, pledged to donate money for every ace served during the Australian summer of tennis. Many cricket players, such as international representatives Chris Lynn, Glenn Maxwell, D'Arcy Short, Matthew Renshaw and Fawad Ahmed pledged to donate money for every wicket and/or six during the remainder of the Australian cricket season. Shane Warne and Jeff Thomson, retired Australian cricketers, donated their baggy green Test cricket caps and Thomson also donated a playing vest for online auction. Warne's cap was purchased by the Commonwealth Bank (Note: It appears that the purchase is in addition to the bank's A$1 million donation referred to above.) with a bid of A$1,007,500; and Russell Crowe's Rabbitohs cap was auctioned with a winning bid in excess of A$500,000. Footballer Mathew Ryan, goalkeeper for Premier League club Brighton & Hove Albion and the Australia national team announced he'll donate $500 for every registered save by an English Premier League goalkeeper on the weekend of 11–12 January 2020. Australian stars who were playing in the 2019–20 NBA season collectively donated in excess of A$1 million; and Lewis Hamilton, a Formula One driver, donated US$500,000.

Comedian Celeste Barber launched a fundraising appeal with a target of raising A$15,000, however it went on to raise over A$50 million, making it the largest fundraiser ever held on Facebook. A telethon conducted with the Sydney New Year's Eve fireworks raised more than A$2 million.

=== Scams and fraud ===
Multiple media outlets reported that the Australian Competition and Consumer Commission (ACCC) received 86 reports of bushfire-related scams. It came as increased requests for cash driven donations leveraging crowdfunding platforms like GoFundMe, or as a result of false links posted on Twitter. It prompted some organisations to provide a list of approved and vetted charities online to reduce fraud.

== See also ==
- List of bushfires in Australia
- Wildfire § Prevention
- List of wildfires
- Fire ecology § Australian eucalypt forests
- Climate of Australia
- List of natural disasters in Australia

== Sources ==
This article incorporates text from a free content work. Licensed under CC BY 4.0 (license statement/permission). Text taken from The Impact of Disasters on Agriculture and Food Security 2025, The Food and Agriculture Organization of the United Nations.
