= ARN Regional =

Australian radio broadcasting company

- Industry: Radio
- Founded: 2022
- Headquarters: Sydney, Australia
- Area served: Regional Australia
- Parent: ARN Media
- Subsidiaries: See below
- Website: www.arn.com.au

ARN Regional is an Australian regional radio network founded after the purchase of a group of radio stations from Grant Broadcasters by ARN parent ARN Media. It includes a small number of metropolitan radio stations.

== History ==
Grant Broadcasters was founded by Walter Grant in 1942 when he bought 2DU in Dubbo. In 1972 a shareholding in 2ST in Nowra was purchased followed in 1979 by 2PK in Parkes and in 1982 2MG in Mudgee. In 1986 2DU, 2PK and 2MG were sold with full ownership taken of 2ST. Over the next three decades, the company expanded through acquisition, purchasing radio stations in all states and territories of Australia, owning 53 stations by November 2021. In January 2022, Here, There & Everywhere purchased 46 stations from Grant Broadcasters and integrated these into its ARN business. The deal was finalised on 4 January 2022.

== Radio stations ==
=== Contemporary Hits Radio (CHR) ===
- Hot 100 100.1 FM and DAB+ – Darwin, translators at Adelaide River 102.1 FM, and Katherine 98.1 FM.
- Hot Tomato, Gold Coast

==== Chilli FM ====
- 90.1 Chilli FM 90.1 FM – Launceston, translator at Launceston City 101.1 FM
- 99.7 Chilli FM 99.7 FM – Scottsdale, translators at Weldborough 94.5 FM, St Marys 103.5 FM and St Helens 90.5 FM

==== Magic FM ====
- Magic FM 89.9 FM – Port Lincoln, translator at Cleve on 97.1 FM
- Magic FM 93.1 FM – Berri, translator at Waikerie on 97.1 FM
- Magic FM 105.9 FM – Spencer Gulf, translator at Roxby Downs on 100.3 FM and Quorn on 100.7 FM

==== Power FM Network ====
- Power FM 102.5 FM – Bega, translator at Batemans Bay 104.3 FM
- Power FM 98.1 FM – Muswellbrook, translator at Merriwa 102.7 FM
- Power FM 94.9 FM – Nowra
- Power FM 103.1 FM – Ballarat
- Power FM 98.7 FM – Murray Bridge, South Australia, translators at Mount Barker 100.3 FM and Victor Harbor 99.7 FM

==== Sea FM ====
- Sea FM 107.7 FM – Devonport
- Sea FM 101.7 FM – Burnie

=== Adult Contemporary ===
- 7HO FM 101.7 FM – Hobart
- Mix 104.9 104.9 FM and DAB+ – Darwin, translators at Adelaide River 98.1 FM, Bathurst Island 89.7 FM, and Katherine 106.9 FM
- River 94.9 94.9 FM – Ipswich
- Hitz FM 93.9 FM – Bundaberg
- Hot 91 91.1 FM – Sunshine Coast
- 96.5 Wave FM 96.5 FM – Wollongong
- 89.3 LAFM 89.3 FM – Launceston, translator at Launceston City 100.3 FM.
- 4CC, 927 AM Gladstone, 1584 AM Rockhampton, 666 AM Biloela, 98.3 FM Agnes Water, Queensland.

=== Rock ===
==== Zinc/Star Network ====
- Star 102.7 Cairns
- Star 101.9 Mackay
- Star 106.3 Townsville
- Zinc 96.1 Sunshine Coast
- Power 100.7 Townsville

=== Classic/Adult Hits ===
- 2EC 765 AM – Bega, translators at Batemans Bay 105.9 FM, Narooma 1584 AM and Eden 105.5 FM. Batemans Bay has some local programming.
- 2NM 981 AM – Muswellbrook
- 2ST 999 AM – Nowra, (Format: Music and Talk), translators at Ulladulla 106.7 FM, Shoalhaven 91.7 FM and Bowral 102.9 FM. Bowral has some local programming.
- 3BA 102.3 FM – Ballarat
- Gold Ten-71 1071 AM – Maryborough (Victoria), translator at Bendigo 98.3 FM
- River 1467AM 1467 AM – Mildura
- 4BU 1332 AM – Bundaberg
- 4CA 846 AM – Cairns
- 4MK 1026 AM – Mackay
- 4RO 990 AM – Rockhampton
- 5AU 97.9 FM – Port Augusta translator at Roxby Downs on 96.3 FM and Quorn on 99.1 FM
- 5CC 765 AM & 93.9 FM – Port Lincoln translator at Cleve on 99.5 FM
- 5CS 1044 AM – Port Pirie
- 5MU 96.3 FM – Murray Bridge, translators at 94.3 FM Mount Barker and 97.1 FM Victor Harbor
- 5RM 801 AM & 91.5 FM – Renmark & 89.9 FM Waikerie
- 7AD 98.9 FM – Devonport
- 7BU 100.9 FM – Burnie, translator at Smithton 94.5 FM
- 7SD 95.7 FM & 540 AM – Scottsdale, translators St.Marys 105.1 FM and St.Helens 92.1 FM.
- 7XS 92.1 FM – Queenstown, translators at Strahan 105.1 FM and Mount Read 107.1 FM.
- Classic Rock DAB+ – Darwin

=== KIX Country Radio Network ===
- Wollongong 105.3 FM
- Geelong 89.3 FM
- Hobart DAB+ Digital
- Muswellbrook 94.5 FM
- Nowra 101.1 FM
- Bowral 1215 AM
- Bega 88.0 FM (Narrowcast)
- Batemans Bay 87.6 FM (Narrowcast)
- Moruya 88.0 FM (Narrowcast)
- Narooma 97.7 FM
- Bermagui 87.6 FM (Narrowcast)
- Tathra 87.6 FM (Narrowcast)
- Merimbula 88.0 FM (Narrowcast)
- Pambula 87.8 FM (Narrowcast)
- Eden 87.6 FM (Narrowcast)
- Barossa Valley 90.5 FM
- Darwin 92.3 FM and DAB+ Digital
- Townsville 89.9FM (Narrowcast)
- Mackay 93.9 FM
- Bundaberg 97.1 FM
- Hervey Bay 92.3 FM
- Maryborough (Queensland) 92.3 FM
- Agnes Water/1770 87.6 FM
- Sarajl 92.1 FM
- Middlemount 94.1 FM
- Yeppoon 96.1 FM
- Rockhampton 92.7 FM
- Gladstone 88.0 FM (Narrowcast)
- Lowood 88.0 FM (Narrowcast)
- Blair Athol 97.5 FM
- Dysart 90.9 FM
- Tlerl 92.1 FM
- Alpha 100.7 FM
- Emerald 88.0 FM (Narrowcast)
- Injune 101.9 FM
- Mitchell 103.7 FM
- Yuleba 89.5 FM
- Surat 94.7 FM
- Inglewood 98.1 FM
- Berri & Renmark 1557 AM
- Port Lincoln 87.6 FM (Narrowcast)
- Clare 87.6 FM (Narrowcast)
- Port Pirie 87.6 FM (Narrowcast)
