= Power FM (disambiguation) =

Power FM is the former name of Capital South Coast, a regional radio station in South Hampshire, England, UK.

Power FM may also refer to:

- Power FM (radio network), a radio network in Australia
- Power FM (Türkiye) and it subranded stations in Turkey
- Power FM 98.1, a radio station in New South Wales, Australia
- Power FM 102.5, a radio station in New South Wales, Australia
- Power FM 103.1, a radio station in Ballarat, Victoria, Australia
- Power FM (South Australia), a radio station in South Australia, Australia
- Power FM (South Africa), a radio station in Gauteng, South Africa
- Power FM Canary Islands, a radio station in the Canary Islands
- KAWA (Power FM), a radio station in Dallas, Texas, United States
