= Kioloa =

- Town
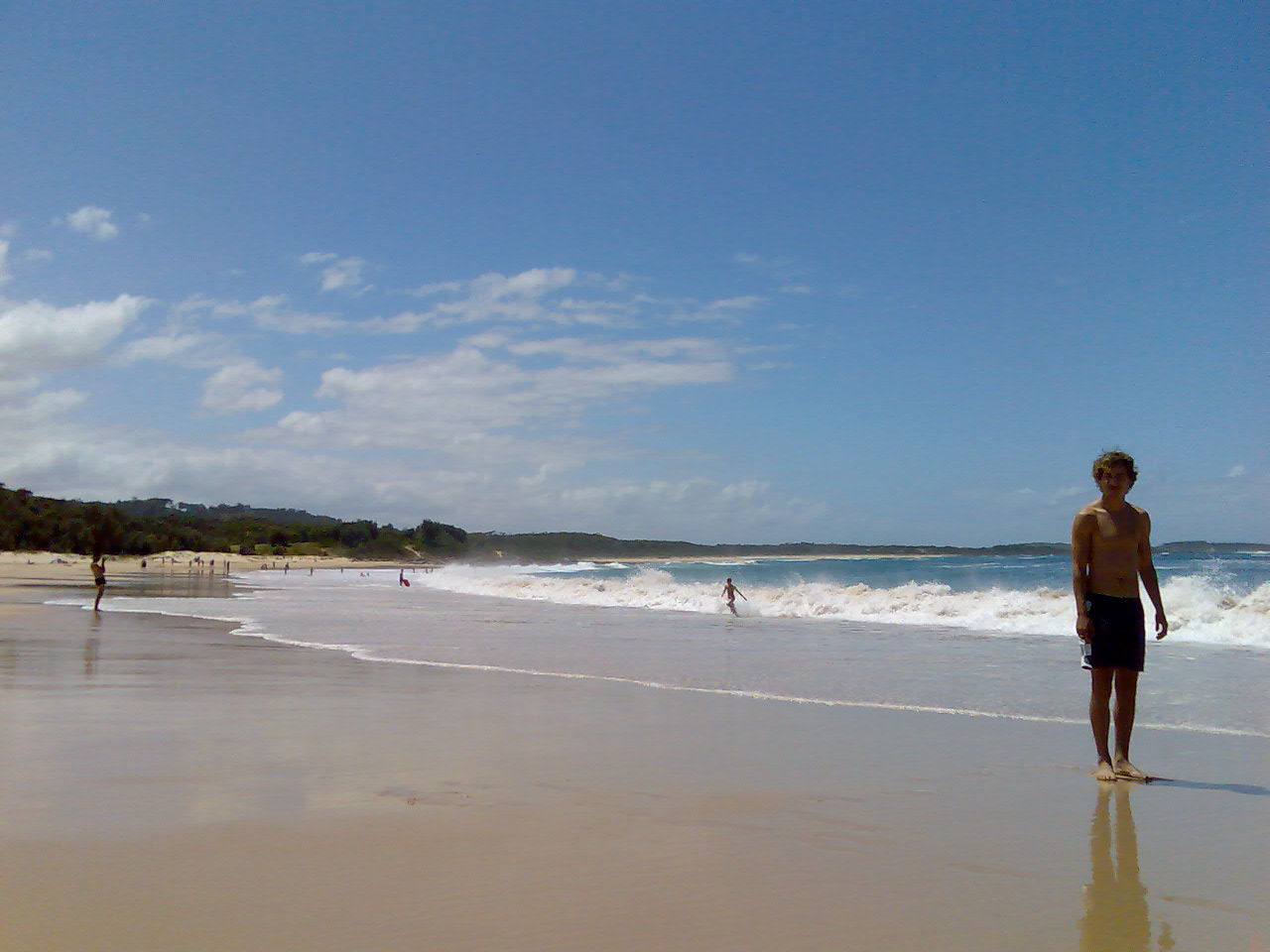
- Kioloa beach as viewed from the southern point

- Coordinates: 35°33′40″S 150°22′27″E
- Country: Australia
- State: New South Wales
- Region: South Coast
- LGA: City of Shoalhaven

Government
  - State electorate: South Coast
  - Federal division: Gilmore

Population
  - Total: 292 (2021 census)
- Postcode: 2539
- County: St Vincent
- Parish: Kioloa
Localities around Kioloa
Termeil	Bawley Point
Cockwhy	Kioloa	Tasman Sea
Cockwhy	Pretty Beach

Kioloa is a small hamlet located on the South Coast of New South Wales, Australia and is within the City of Shoalhaven local government area. It is pronounced by locals as 'Ky-ola'. At the 2021 census, Kioloa had a population of 292.

The Australian National University's Kioloa Coastal Campus is north of the town.

Its neighbour is Bawley Point, which is accessed via Murramarang Road, the only sealed access road in and out of Kioloa. Both of these villages rely mainly upon tourism as a source of income. Kioloa has three large caravan parks offering a range of accommodation options to suit all budgets and one general store. The area is well known throughout the region for its pristine beaches and peak surfing conditions. As an isolated coastal retreat, Kioloa is infamous among holiday-goers for its lack of mobile phone reception and its large peaceful rays.

Kioloa is the southern terminus of local bus services provided on weekdays by Ulladulla Bus Lines. Route 741 runs twice daily from Kioloa to Ulladulla via Bawley Point, Termeil, Tabourie and Burrill Lake. An additional afternoon service runs on school days.

Kioloa had a public school from 1879 to 1893 and 1912 to 1922, classified variously as a "public", "half-time" or "provisional" school.

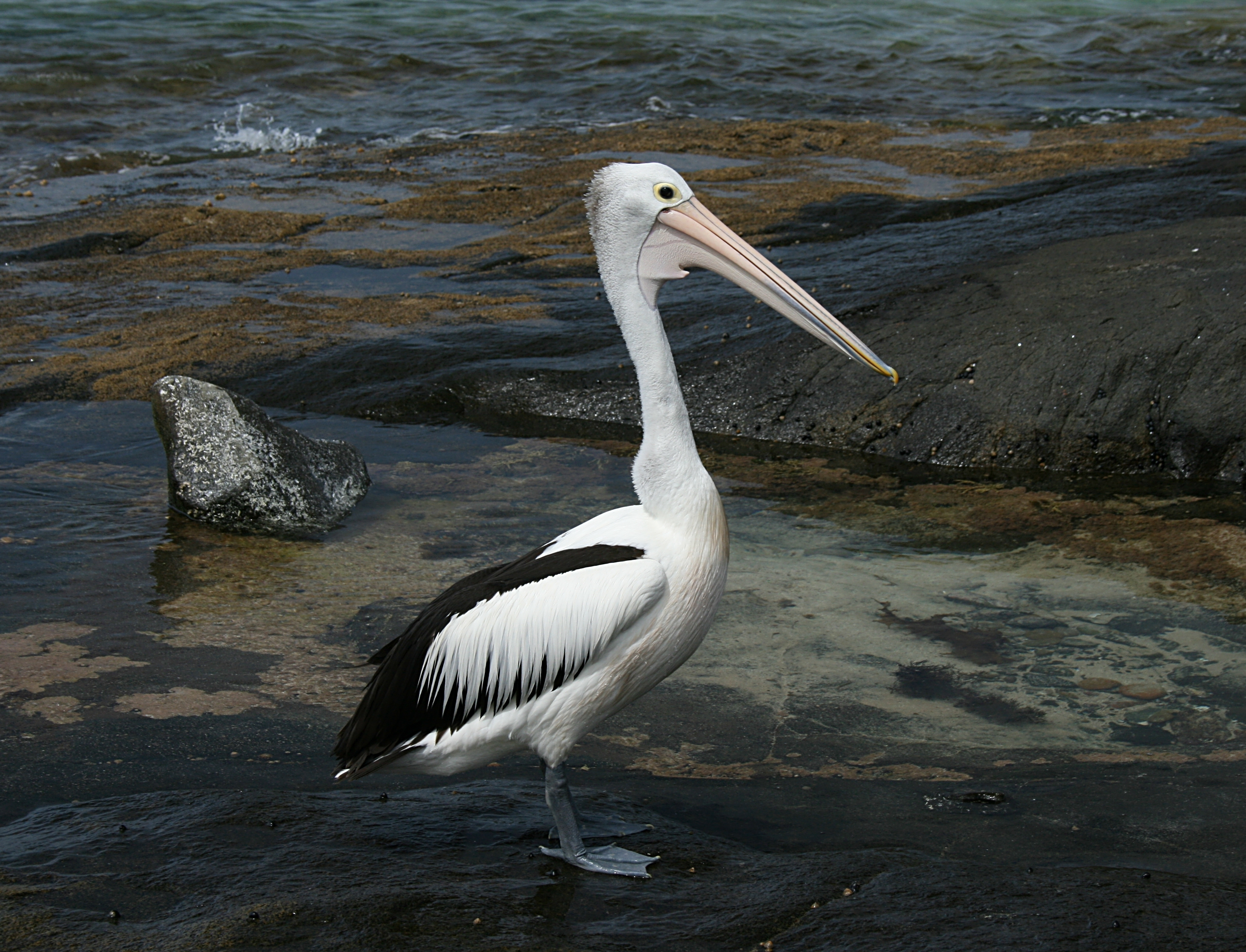
Local pelicans collect the fish scraps around the boat ramp.
