= The Bega Standard and Candelo, Merimbula, Pambula, Eden, Wolumla, and General Advertiser =

Former newspaper in New South Wales, Australia

The Bega Standard and Candelo, Merimbula, Pambula, Eden, Wolumla, and General Advertiser, also previously published as Southern Standard, was a weekly, later semiweekly English language newspaper published in Bega, New South Wales, Australia.

Front page, The Bega Standard and Candelo, Merimbula, Pambula, Eden, Wolumla, and General Advertiser

== Newspaper history ==
The Bega Standard and Candelo, Merimbula, Pambula, Eden, Wolumla, and General Advertiser was published from 1874 to September 1923. Prior to this it was known as the Southern Standard and began in 1868. In 1923 the publication merged with The Bega Budget and The Southern Star to form Bega District News, which is a continuing publication.

== Digitisation ==
The Bega Standard and Candelo, Merimbula, Pambula, Eden, Wolumla, and General Advertiser has been digitised as part of the Australian Newspapers Digitisation Program of the National Library of Australia.

== See also ==
- List of newspapers in New South Wales
- List of newspapers in Australia
