= 2EC =

- Bega, Batemans Bay; Australia
- Broadcast area: South Coast, New South Wales
- Frequencies: 94.5 MHz; 105.5 MHz; 105.9 MHz

Programming
- Format: Classic hits

Ownership
- Owner: ARN; (East Coast Radio Pty Ltd)
- Sister stations: Power FM NSW South Coast

History
- First air date: 30 September 1937
- Former call signs: 2BE
- Call sign meaning: East Coast Radio

Technical information
- Licensing authority: Australian Communications & Media Authority
- ERP: Various

Links
- Website: 2ec.com.au

2EC is a radio station broadcasting to the South Coast, New South Wales, Australia, specifically the local government areas of Eurobodalla and Bega Valley. It is owned a subsidiary of ARN.

== History ==
2BE began test broadcasting in February 1937. The station was officially opened on 30 September 1937.

As at 1987, it was owned by Hoyts. In November 2021, 2EC, along with other stations owned by Grant Broadcasters, were acquired by ARN. This deal allowed Grant's stations, including 2EC, to access ARN's iHeartRadio platform in regional areas. The deal was finalised on 4 January 2022. It is expected 2EC will integrate with ARN's Pure Gold Network, but will retain its current name according to the press release from ARN.

== Frequencies ==
- 765 AM: Bega Valley and surrounds. Can be heard throughout most of the coverage area, and along the coastline for great distances. Transmitter is located at Kalaru (36.7442°S 149.9369°E). Note: This AM service is scheduled to be decommissioned in March 2021 and is being replaced by a new service on 94.5 FM.
- 94.5 FM: Bega Valley and surrounds. Transmitting from Mount Mumbulla @ ~5Kw ERP with an Omnidirectional radiation pattern. Primary coverage area is the Bega Valley, Tathra, Bermagui, Wolumla and surrounding areas. This FM service was commissioned in February 2021 and replaces the above 765 AM service.
- 105.5 FM: Eden and surrounds. Transmitting 1 kW from Bimmil Hill near Eden (37.0110°S 149.8896°E), the translator covers Merimbula, Eden and Mallacoota adequately. In exceptional atmospheric conditions, this transmitter can cover much of the 2EC license area, and has been heard as far north as Sydney.
- 105.9 FM: Eurobodalla, plus some towns in the southern Shoalhaven such as Bawley Point and Tabourie Lake. Transmits at 20 kW (directional pattern) from Mount Wandera west of Moruya (35.7960°S 150.0054°E). In good atmospheric conditions, the transmitter can be heard in the Bega Valley region, as well as north to the Shoalhaven and Illawarra. The transmission has been heard as far north as Bulahdelah on the New South Wales North Coast.

== Programming ==
The station airs a classic hits format, with the same playlist as other stations part of the ARN Regional Pure Gold Network.

The station is unique in NSW in that it takes both NRL and AFL coverage, possibly owing to its position near the Victorian border. AFL is heard Saturday afternoon from midday, whilst NRL is covered Friday night, Saturday night and Sunday afternoons with the 2EC Continuous Call Team.

== Affiliations ==
- Sports Entertainment Network (AFL coverage)
- 2GB Sydney (NRL coverage)
