= 3GL =

3GL may refer to:

- 3GL, a Geelong, Victoria radio station, rebranded as 95.5 K-Rock and then relaunched again as 3GL
- Third-generation programming language
- Metal Storm 3GL, a semi-automatic electronic grenade launcher for infantry
