= East Coast Radio =

East Coast Radio may refer to:

- East Coast Radio (Australia)
- East Coast Radio (Ireland)
- East Coast Radio (South Africa)
