= K Rock 95.5 =

Radio station in Geelong, Australia

K Rock 95.5 (3CAT)
- Geelong, Victoria; Australia
- Frequency: 95.5 MHz

Programming
- Language: English
- Format: Comedy, sport, Top 40 (CHR)

Ownership
- Owner: Grant Broadcasters
- Sister stations: 93.9 Bay FM

History
- First air date: 3 December 1930 (as 3GL); 27 January 1990 (as 3CAT)
- Former call signs: 3GL (1930–1990)
- Former frequencies: 1400 kHz AM (1930–1935); 1350 kHz AM (1935–1978); 1341 kHz AM (1978–1990)
- Call sign meaning: 3 prefix for Victoria plus "Cat", representing the Geelong Cats

Technical information
- Licensing authority: ACMA
- ERP: 55 kW
- Transmitter coordinates: 38.146994°S 144.361017°E

Links
- Public licence information: Profile
- Website: www.krock.com.au

K Rock 95.5 (call sign: 3CAT; stylised as K rock 95.5) is a commercial FM radio station based in Geelong, Australia. K Rock operates a mainstream Top 40 playlist and also airs Australian Football League matches involving the Geelong Football Club.

K Rock shares transmitter facilities with sister station 93.9 Bay FM (along with 94.7 The Pulse and 96.3 Rhema FM), broadcasting from a transmitter on top of Murradoc Hill on the Bellarine Peninsula. The license area covers the Greater Geelong area, Werribee and Western Melbourne, The Golden Plains, and the Surf Coast. K Rock also streams online via their website.

The station was originally known as 3GL and broadcast on the AM band, most famously 1341 AM from 1978 onwards. In 1990, it was transferred to 95.5 on the FM band and changed its name to K-Rock. In 2023, 3GL was revived on 1341 AM and now broadcasts as its own station independent of K-Rock.

== History ==
=== 3GL original run (1930 - 1990) ===
From 1930 to 1990, K Rock was known as 3GL on the AM band, broadcasting first on 1400 kHz, then 1350 kHz and later 1341 kHz. Although based in Geelong, it was notable for being received over most of the Melbourne metropolitan area.

3GL gave Happy Hammond his start in broadcasting in 1948 as a breakfast announcer. While at 3GL, Hammond also made his first TV appearance in 1948, long before the Tarax Show, as part of an exhibition using closed-circuit TV equipment for trial purposes. Towards the end of its time as an AM station, 3GL used the "3GL on the West Coast" slogan and associated jingles, many sung by Mike Brady.

For many years, 3GL was based in James Street, Geelong, but relocated after being granted the right to convert to the FM band in 1990.

3GL was offered an FM conversion upon the entry to the Geelong market of competitor BAY FM in December 1989. 3GL converted to FM to allow equal competition in the Geelong regional market, with the management of the former Geelong AM service agreeing to transfer the service to the FM band in 1990. The station was going to drop the 3GL call sign in favour of 3CAT (after the Geelong Cats), as proposed by the radio station's head of football commentary Ted Whitten (who at the time was in the early stages of his battle with cancer). However, the official call sign, 3CAT-FM has never been used on-air. Instead, a decision was made to adopt the moniker K-Rock for the station's commencement on the FM band at 95.5 MHz, on 27 January 1990.

=== K Rock (1990 - present) ===
After simulcasting on both 1341 AM and 95.5 FM for two weeks, K Rock went to air at midday on the Saturday of the Australia Day weekend 1990, the first announcer to speak on the new FM station was Ian 'Strawny' Strachan.

K Rock was also among the first commercial FM stations to cover AFL football, along with 3KKZ (KZFM) the same year. The lineup included Ted Whitten, Sam Kekovich, Billy Brownless and Dwayne Russell, K Rock continues to focus on Geelong Football Club matches.

Originally owned by Hoyts, which operated Triple M brand in Australia, K Rock was sold to Grant Broadcasters in the mid-1990s. Shortly after this, the station purchased the rival Geelong station, 93.9 Bay FM, moving it from its Ryrie Street studios to co-locate in the K Rock studios in Moorabool Street, Geelong. Both K Rock and Bay FM now operate from the same studios in Geelong's CBD.

In 2007, K Rock celebrated 75 years of broadcasting 3GL and K Rock Footy, culminating in a week of broadcasting at various events as the city celebrated the first AFL Premiership victory by the Geelong Football Club in 44 years.

In 2010, K Rock underwent a major format change which re-focused the music toward a younger audience and minimised the station's traditional rock base. In later years, K Rock would take the ARN Regional music log, which is heard on ARN's regional stations including Power FM 103.1. From 1 December 2003, K Rock's music resumed selecting their music locally, with the positioner Big hit energy. In 2026 the station won an Australian Audio Award for Best Australian Music Programming. From 3 January 2024, it has featured a weekly program dedicated to celebrating local artists and local shows around Geelong and the Surf Coast called Great Ocean Odes. It's one of the few independent commercial stations in Australia that can be local like this with its music and is reaping the benefits locally with increased ratings in the recent survey

=== 3GL revival (2023 - present) ===
In 2023, 3GL was reactivated on the original 1341 AM frequency with a "classic hits" format. Test transmissions commenced intermittently in December 2023, using the station ID sweepers from the 70's and 80's "West Coast's 3GL 1341" and "Classic Hits 3GL Geelong", then continuously from New Years Day 2024. The station officially relaunched on 1 April 2024 under the slogan "Hits and Memories". It continues to broadcast in its new form as a separate station from K-Rock.

== K Rock Football ==
K Rock only commentates on every home and away and finals matches involving the Geelong Cats plus most other finals including the Grand Final from Melbourne. The station also covers the match of the round from the Geelong Football Netball League.

Current K Rock team (2026)
Commentators	Experts	Boundary
Tom King	Mark Neeld	Jason Doherty
Ben Casanelia	Shaun Higgins	Tim Bolch
Jason Doherty	Cameron Mooney	
	Matt Kershaw	
	Tom Lonergan	
