= Bay 93.9 =

Coordinates: 38.1469°S 144.3614°E

Bay 93.9 (3BAY)
- Geelong, Victoria; Australia
- Frequency: 93.9 MHz

Programming
- Language: English
- Format: Adult contemporary

Ownership
- Owner: Grant Broadcasters; (Geelong Broadcasters Pty Ltd)
- Sister stations: 95.5 K-Rock

History
- First air date: 10 December 1989

Technical information
- Licensing authority: ACMA
- ERP: 56 kW
- Transmitter coordinates: –38.147011,144.360695

Links
- Public licence information: Profile
- Webcast: www.bay939.com.au/listen
- Website: www.bay939.com.au

Bay 93.9 (call sign 3BAY) is a commercial FM radio station based in Geelong, Victoria, Australia. Commencing broadcasting in 1989, the station broadcasts an adult contemporary format.

== History ==
Initially known as Bay FM, the station was originally licensed as part of a Commonwealth Government plan to increase the diversity of radio services in regional centres. The station's launch date is disputed – the Australian Communications and Media Authority, which oversees licensing of radio services in Australia, lists the station's launch date as 10 December 1989.

== Announcers ==
=== Current Announcers ===
- Lisa (Milly) Millard – Mill & Nic in the morning 06:00 – 9:00 (6–9 am) weekdays
- Nic O’Riley – Mill & Nic in the morning 06:00 – 9:00 (6–9 am) weekdays
- Guy Mylecharane - Workdays 09:00 - 2:00 including "The 80's Lunch"
- Craig Meddings – Drive 02:00 – 6:00 weekdays
- Dave Ferguson – Bay Property Guide 8 am–10 am Saturday
