= Meroo National Park =

National park in New South Wales, Australia

- IUCN category II (national park)
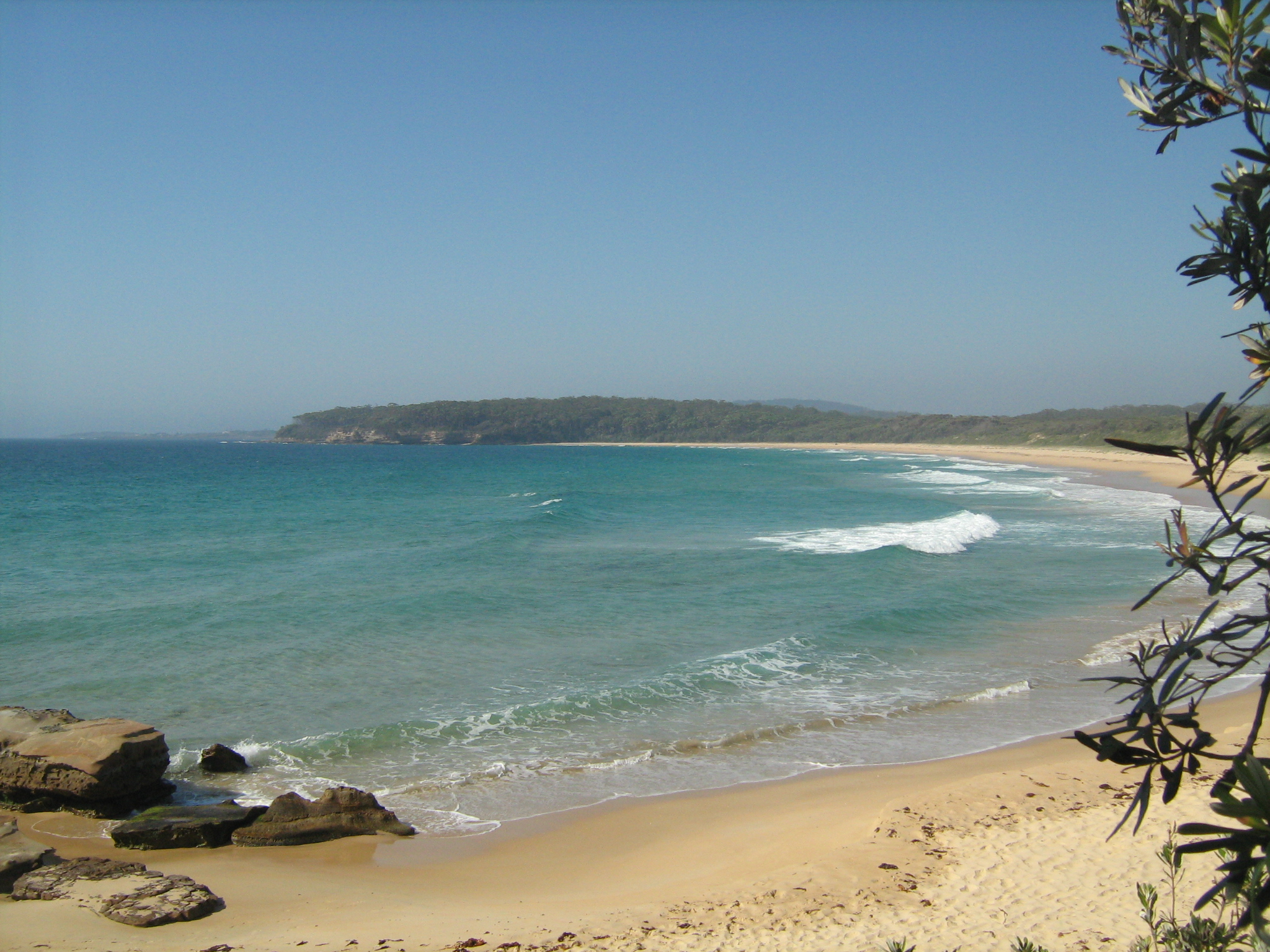
- View looking south from Termeil Point

- Location within New South Wales
- Location: New South Wales
- Nearest city: Tabourie Lake, New South Wales
- Coordinates: 35°25′15″S 150°24′15″E
- Established: 2001
- Governing body: NSW National Parks & Wildlife Service
- Website: Official website

Meroo National Park is a national park in on South Coast of New South Wales, Australia. It is located near Batemans Bay and Ulladulla and noted for its beaches and forests.

== History ==
Meroo has only recently been designated as a National Park. Previously it was a state forest which contained an unregulated camp ground with beaches and bushland. The area was badly damaged over ten years ago by bushfires. Because of this damage and its constant use by holiday goers, the National Park lands authority created a National Park on this State Forest land in an attempt to help regenerate the bushland.

== Description ==
Tidal rockpools, beaches, and a rocky island can be reached at low tide. Many sea creatures can be found such as crabs, star fish, small fish and sea urchins. Since its creation as a National Park new rules and regulations have been brought in to increase care of the natural bushland and native fauna. Fenced off areas around the headlands have been created to slow erosion and areas for camping have been reduced. This has helped to increase the natural bush regenerate from the devastating fires. The park's wildlife appears to be increasing in numbers with wallabies and possums being seen regularly. The sound of native birds can be heard again too. The park forms part of the Ulladulla to Merimbula Important Bird Area, identified as such by BirdLife International because of its importance for swift parrots.

Meroo is home to 12 endangered wildlife species, including the nationally endangered green and golden bell frog.

The average elevation of the terrain is 55 metres above sea level.

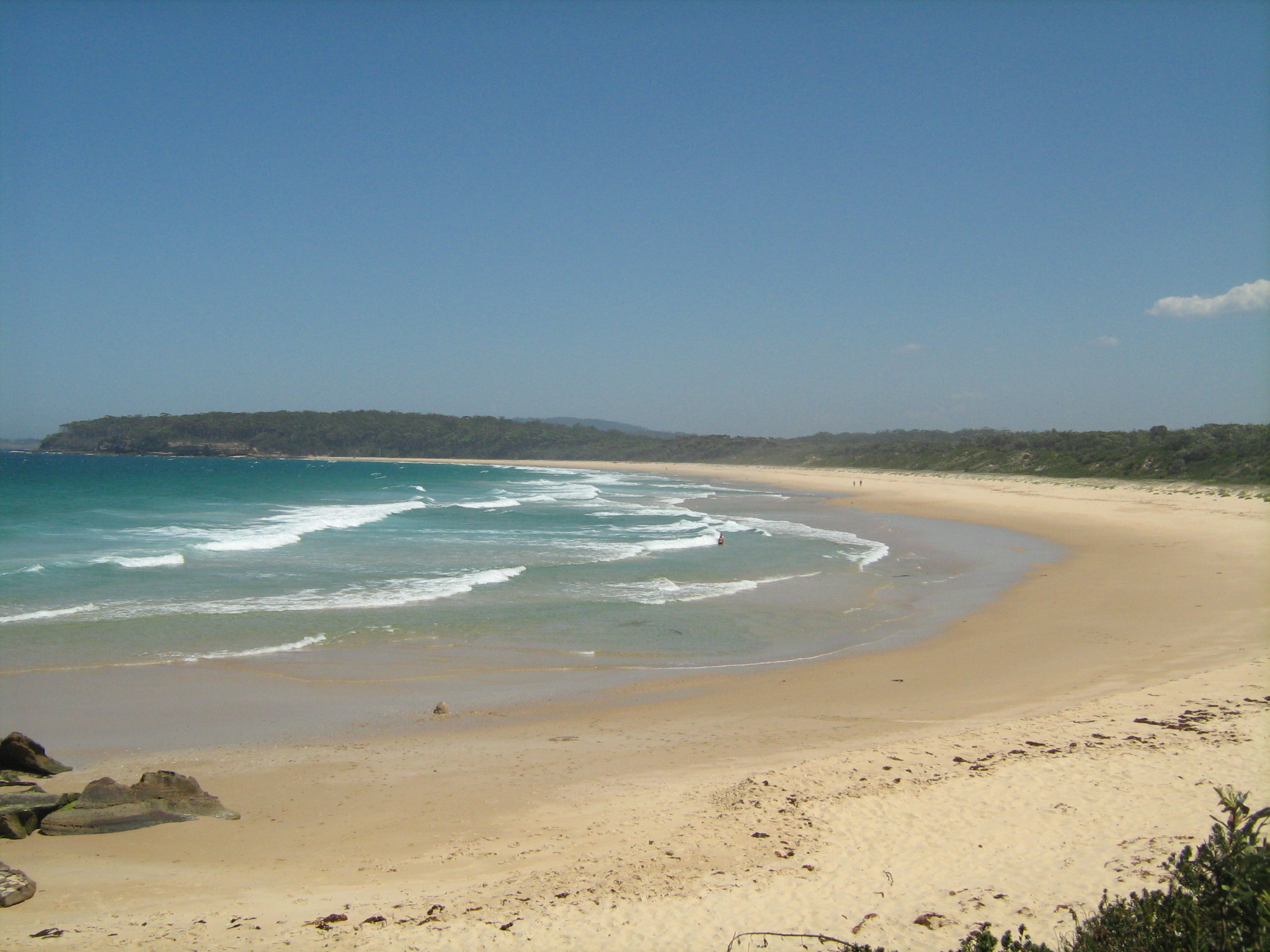
Beach directly south of Termeil Point

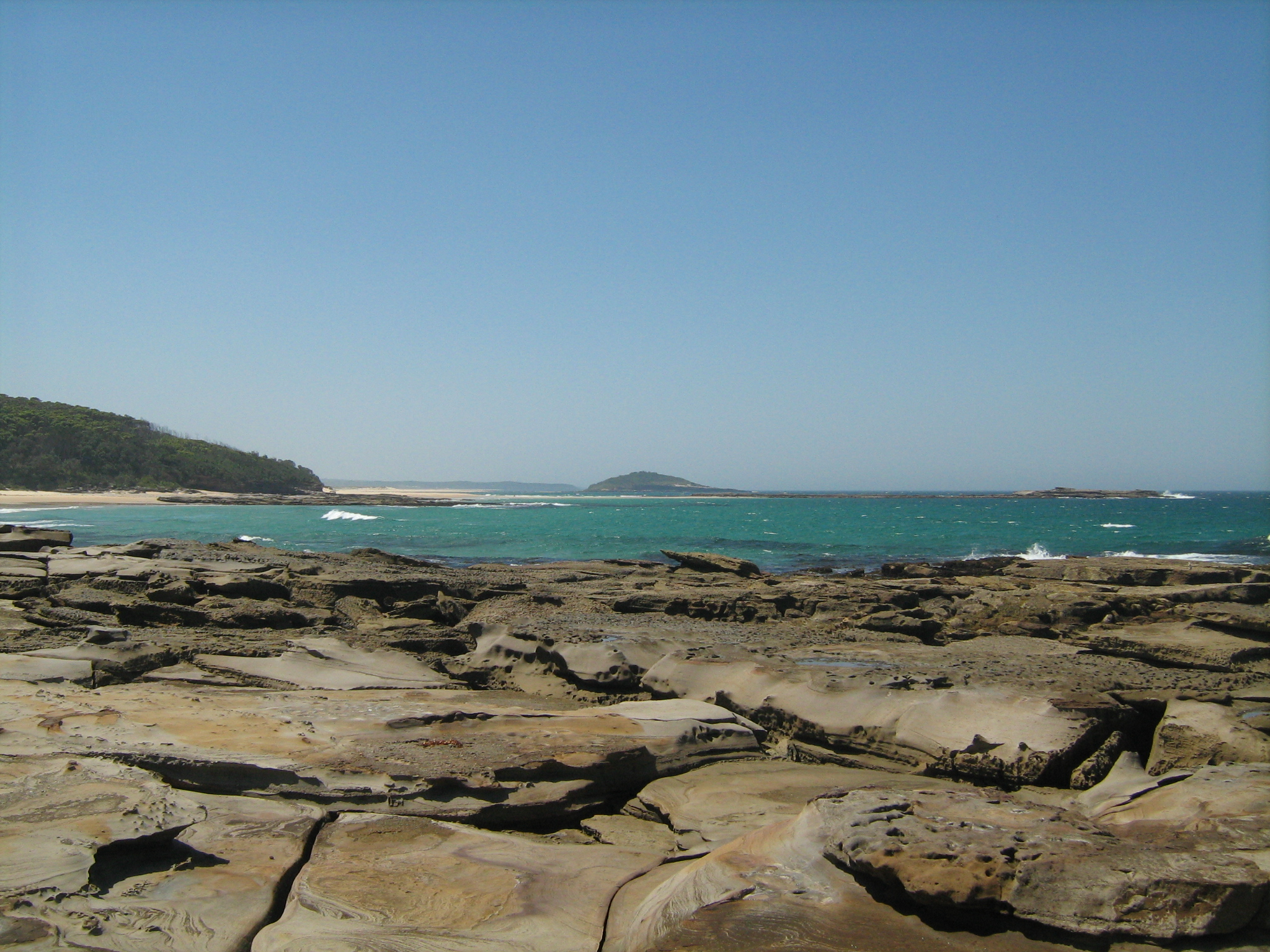
View north from Termeil Point towards Tabourie Lake

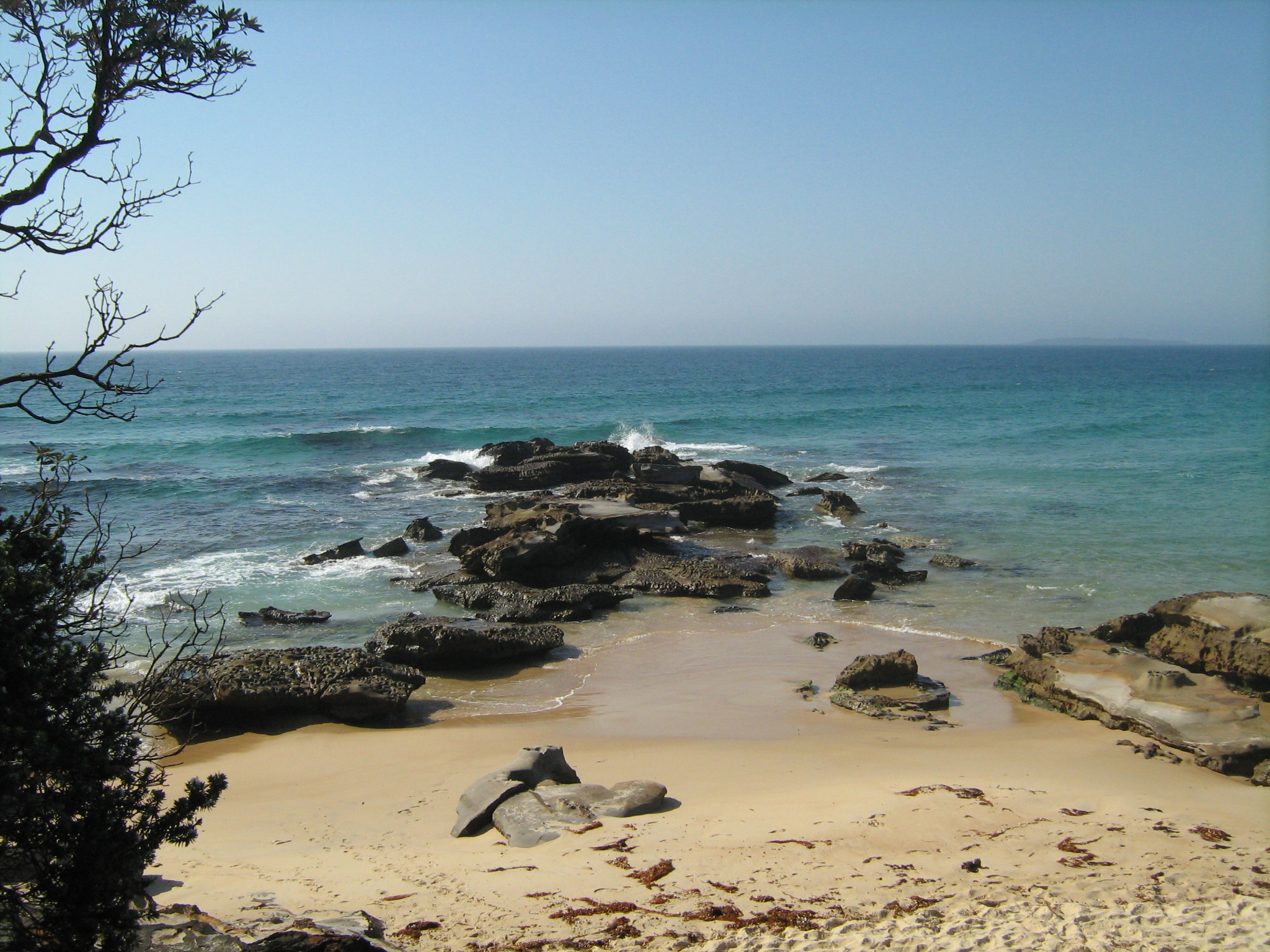
Rocks at Termeil Point, Meroo National Park

== See also ==
- Protected areas of New South Wales
