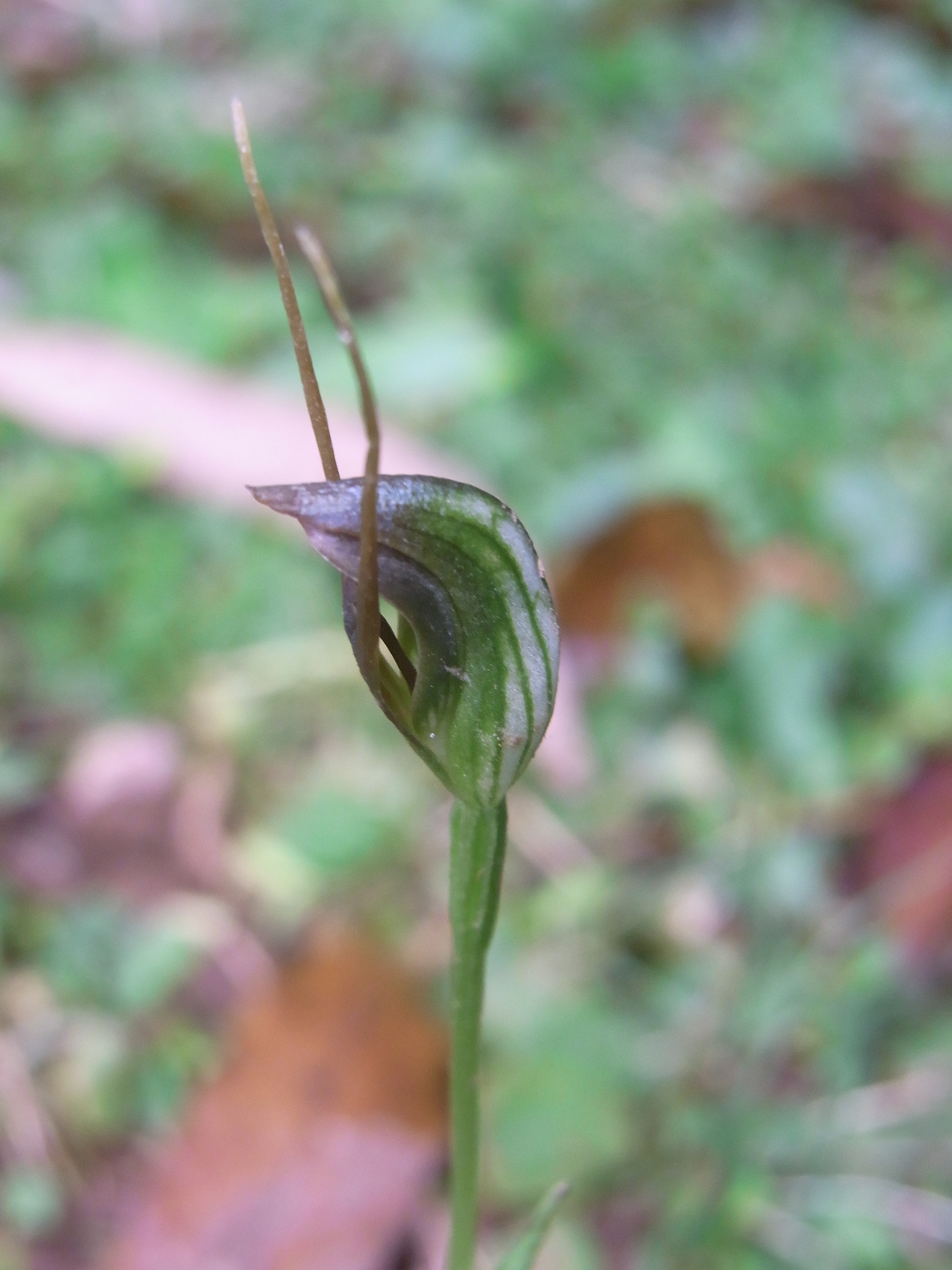

Scientific classification
- Kingdom: Plantae
- Clade: Tracheophytes
- Clade: Angiosperms
- Clade: Monocots
- Order: Asparagales
- Family: Orchidaceae
- Subfamily: Orchidoideae
- Tribe: Cranichideae
- Genus: Pterostylis
- Species: P. oblonga

Binomial name
- Pterostylis oblonga D.L.Jones

= Pterostylis oblonga =

Coastal maroonhood

Species of orchid

Pterostylis oblonga, commonly known as coastal maroonhood, is a species of orchid endemic to New South Wales where it grows on the coast and tablelands. Both flowering and non-flowering plants have a rosette of dark green leaves lying flat on the ground. Flowering plants have a relatively small greenish brown and white flower which has darker brown tips.

== Description ==
Pterostylis oblonga is a terrestrial, perennial, deciduous herb with an underground tuber. Both flowering and non-flowering plants have a rosette of dark green leaves, each leaf 20–60 mm (0.8–2 in) long and 10–20 mm (0.4–0.8 in) wide. Flowering plants have a single greenish brown and white flower 14–17 mm (0.6–0.7 in) long and 5–9 mm (0.2–0.4 in) wide on a flowering stem 80–220 mm (3–9 in) high. The dorsal sepal and petals are fused, forming a hood or "galea" over the column, the galea with a dark brown tip. There is a wide gap between the petals and the lateral sepals and the sinus between the lateral sepals has a central notch and curves slightly forward. The labellum is 5–6 mm (0.20–0.24 in) long, about 2 mm (0.08 in) wide, and is brown and blunt. Flowering occurs from July to September.

== Taxonomy and naming ==
Pterostylis oblonga was first formally described in 2006 by David Jones from a specimen collected near Bawley Point and the description was published in the journal Australian Orchid Research. The specific epithet (oblonga) is a Latin word meaning "longer than broad".

== Distribution and habitat ==
Coastal maroonhood grows mainly in coastal and near coastal forest between Coffs Harbour and Nowra.
