= Brush Island =

Island in Australia

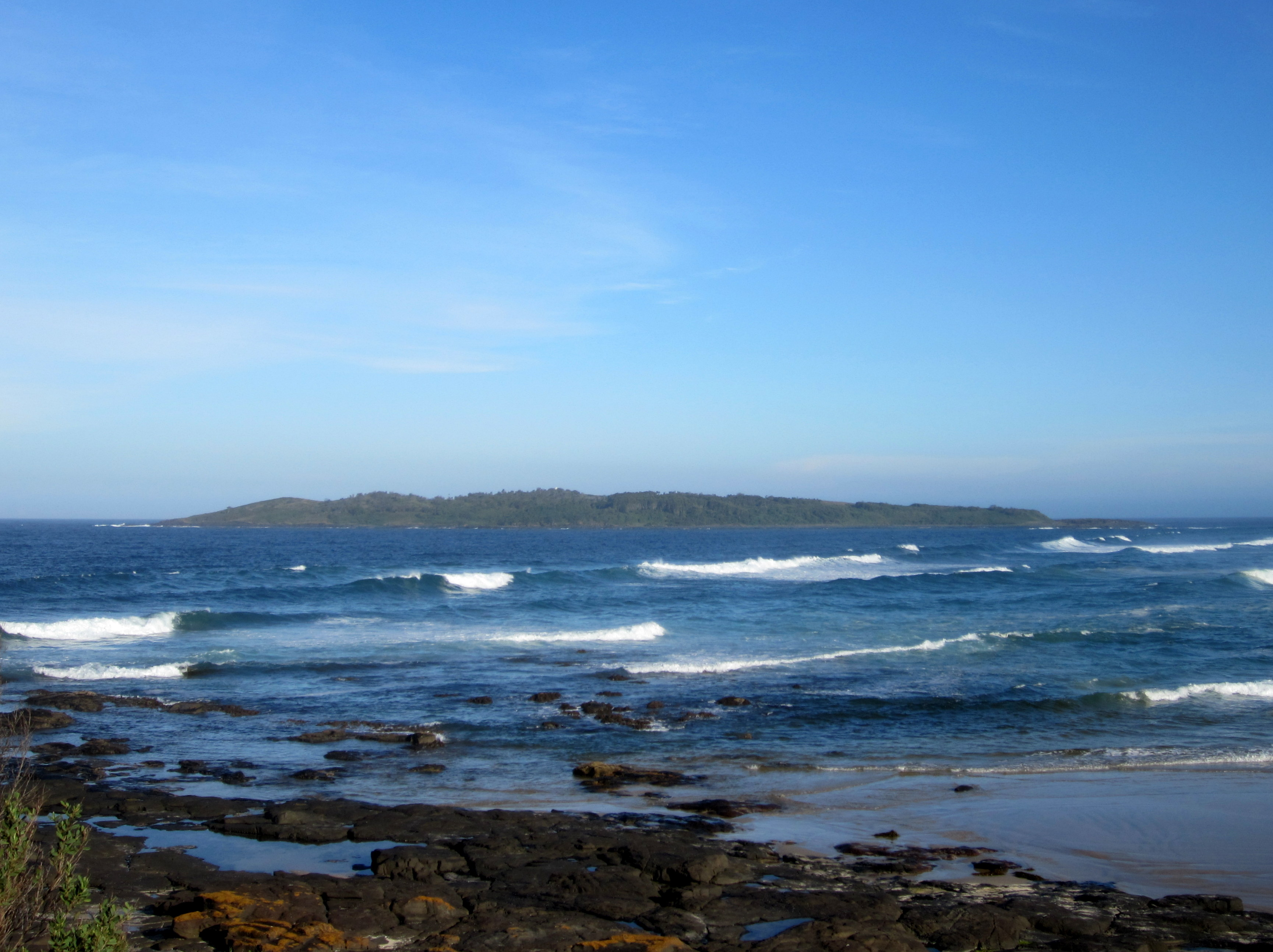
- Brush Island viewed from the northern end of Murramarang Beach
- Interactive map of Brush Island

Geography
- Location: Tasman Sea
- Highest elevation: 30 m (100 ft)

Administration
- Australia
- State: New South Wales

Brush Island Nature Reserve
- IUCN category Ia (strict nature reserve)
- Location within New South Wales
- Location: New South Wales
- Nearest city: Bawley Point
- Coordinates: 35°31′45″S 150°25′00″E
- Area: 0.47 km^{2} (0.18 sq mi)
- Established: July 1963
- Governing body: NSW National Parks & Wildlife Service
- Website: http://www.environment.nsw.gov.au/NationalParks/parkHome.aspx?id=N0415

The Brush Island is a continental island, contained within the Brush Island Nature Reserve, a protected nature reserve, known as Mit Island in the Dhurga language of the Murramamrang people of the Yuin nation see (http://press-files.anu.edu.au/downloads/press/p326831/html/ch01.xhtml) It is located off the south coast of New South Wales, Australia. The 47-hectare (120-acre) island and reserve is situated within the Tasman Sea, approximately 2 kilometres (1.2 mi) south-east of the coastal village of Bawley Point.

The island was gazetted as a nature reserve in July 1963 and is important for breeding seabirds. The reserve is listed on Australia’s Register of the National Estate, and has an unmanned lighthouse.

== Description ==
The island lies 350 metres (1,150 ft) from the tip of Murramarang Point. It is 880 metres (2,890 ft) long, with a maximum width of 560 metres (1,840 ft), and rises to about 30 metres (98 ft) above sea level. Its shorelines are steep, rocky cliff faces with erosion gullies on the northern side. The gullies are both caused and used by the little penguins whose tracks and burrows cover most of the island.

== History ==
The island was sighted by Captain James Cook on 22 April 1770 during his first voyage to the South Pacific Ocean. Cook had planned to shelter HMS Endeavour between the unnamed island and mainland but was prevented by high seas. Instead Endeavour continued its northward path along the coast, making her first Australian landfall a week later at Botany Bay.

== Flora and fauna ==
The island supports a coastal vegetation cover of herbs, low shrubs and stunted trees, including Carpobrotus glaucescens, Lomandra longifolia, Einadia hastata, Myoporum insulare, Enchylaena tomentosa, Acacia longifolia, Westringia fruticosa, Banksia integrifolia and Casuarina glauca.

Seabird species nesting on the island include the wedge-tailed shearwater, short-tailed shearwater, little penguin and sooty oystercatcher. White-faced storm petrels and sooty shearwaters were found there for the first time in 2008.

=== Rat eradication ===
The island became infested with black rats in 1932 after a steamer, the Northern Firth, ran aground there. In 2005 the rats were eradicated after a poisoning campaign by the NSW National Parks & Wildlife Service.

== See also ==
- List of islands of New South Wales
- Protected areas of New South Wales
