= The Bega Budget =

Former newspaper in New South Wales, Australia

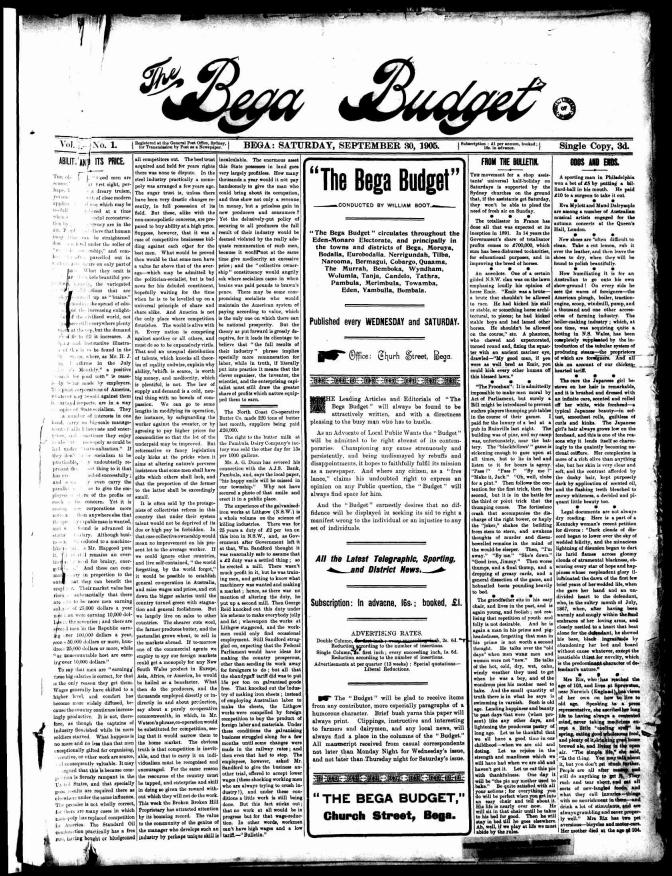
The Bega Budget, 30 September 1905

The Bega Budget was a biweekly newspaper published in Bega, New South Wales, Australia from 1905 until 1923.

== History ==
The Bega Budget was first published on 30 September 1905 by William Boot. Boot ran the paper until 1923 when it was sold to the proprietors of the other newspapers in Bega. The Bega Budget was then merged with Southern Star and Bega Standard to produce the Bega District News.

== Digitisation ==
The paper has been digitised as part of the Australian Newspapers Digitisation Program project of the National Library of Australia.

== See also ==
- List of newspapers in Australia
- List of newspapers in New South Wales
