= Paul Cashmere =

Australian music journalist

- Born: Sydney, Australia
- Occupations: Music journalist, media executive
- Known for: CEO of Undercover News, Noise11 media and entertainment websites

Paul Cashmere is an Australian entrepreneur, broadcaster, music journalist and media executive. In 1995 he founded the digital music CD-ROM magazine, Undercover, with Australian photographer and domestic partner, Ros O'Gorman (1960–2018). In September 2011 the pair founded the Noise Network including Noise11.com. As of September 2011 Cashmere was CEO and executive producer of the Noise Network.

== Biography ==
Paul Cashmere began as a radio broadcaster in the late 1970s. He started at 2AD, Armidale (1977), then Nowra-based 2ST (1978 to 1981), EON-FM (1981–1983) and Fox FM (1983–1984). He then moved to 2WL, Wollongong (owned by Fairfax Media) and became Program Director. When 2WL was sold to Mark Day's ACE Radio Network he became Program Director of the network. In the 1991 Cashmere became the National Program Director of Syndication for Austereo.

Cashmere and partner Roslyn "Ros" O'Gorman (in-house photographer) founded Undercover in 1995. Undercover was the original music partner for the launch of Yahoo! and AOL in 1998 in Australia. Cashmere held a board position with digital broadcast company Whoopi Ltd from 1999 to 2001. From 2004 to 2007 he was the Australian and Senior Vice President of Media and Content for Roo Group in New York City. In July 2006 The Age's EG Guide provided a listing of "the 15 most amazing music sites on the web" with Undercover at No. 5, "Best for: Australian music news." At that time the site was affiliated with US sites: music.com, rock.com and Verizon Wireless. In December 2007 the Cashmere family took back ownership of Undercover. Cashmere served as executive director of GoConnect from 2010 until June 2011.

In September 2011 Cashmere and O'Gorman founded The Noise Network together with its music news and interviews channel, Noise11.com. In November 2011 and again in November 2015 he addressed the annual Face the Music conference at the Arts Centre Melbourne. Cashmere has appeared on Australian television, commenting on the music industry, providing biographies or obituaries. He occasionally appears on Weekend Sunrise and The Project and in the past has appeared on Today Tonight, RocKwiz, Hey Hey It's Saturday and A Current Affair. In 2018–2019 he was a regular with Dr. Sally Cockburn on radio 2GB, 3AW and 4BC.

== Personal life ==
By 1995 Paul Cashmere was working with his domestic partner Roslyn "Ros" O'Gorman as the in-house photographer for Undercover. Cashmere and O'Gorman had two children, Tim Cashmere and Haylee Cashmere. Both Tim (music writer, interviewer and photographer) and Haylee (production manager, photographer and music writer) have worked for Undercover and Noise11. Ros O'Gorman died on 29 May 2018, of an unspecified cancer, aged 58.
