= Termeil =

- Town
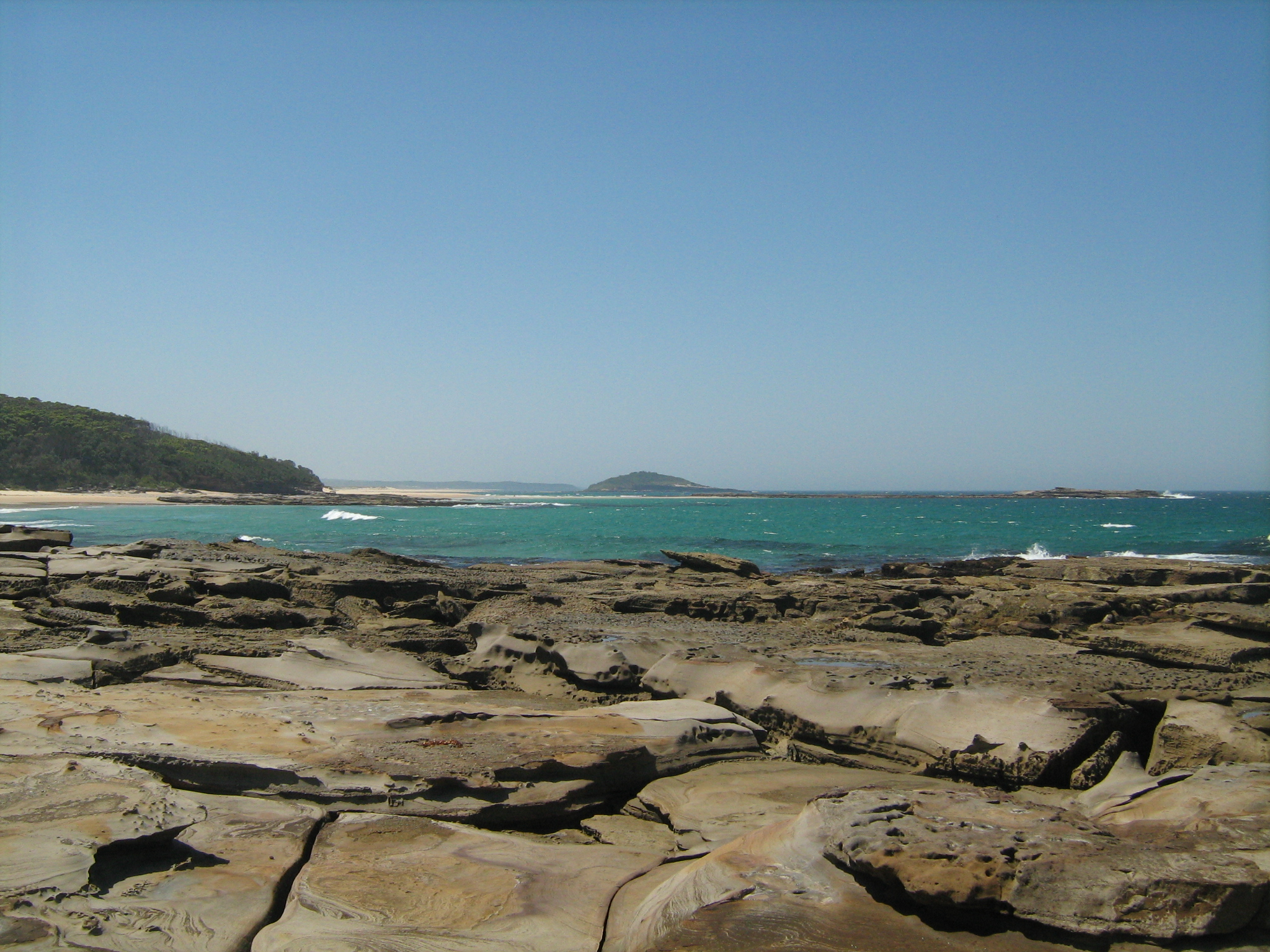
- Looking north from Termeil Point towards Lake Tabourie

- Coordinates: 35°28′S 150°21′E
- Country: Australia
- State: New South Wales
- Region: South Coast
- LGA: City of Shoalhaven

Government
  - State electorate: South Coast
  - Federal division: Gilmore

Population
  - Total: 273 (SAL 2021)
- Postcode: 2539
- County: St Vincent
- Parish: Termeil
Localities around Termeil
Morton	Morton	Tabourie Lake
Brooman	Termeil	Tasman Sea
Cockwhy	Cockwhy	Bawley Point

Termeil is a small village in the Shoalhaven area of New South Wales, Australia. Termeil is a predominantly rural hamlet at the junction of the Princes Highway and Bawley Point Road, providing access to the beachside communities of Bawley Point and Kioloa. Ulladulla Bus Lines route 741 serves Termeil twice per day on weekdays.

Termeil had a public school from 1885 to 1941 and 1943 to 1955, generally classified as a "public" school, but sometimes as a "provisional" school.

During the 2019–20 Australian bushfire season, a number of large fires merged and threatened Termeil, with many residents unable to evacuate and forced to shelter in place for several days due to surrounding firefronts to the north, south and west of the village.
