= Power FM (radio network) =

- Various; Australia
- Broadcast area: Australia
- Frequency: Various
- Branding: Power FM

Programming
- Language: English
- Format: Contemporary hit radio

Ownership
- Owner: ARN

Links
- Website: www.powerfm.com.au

The Power FM Network is a radio station network owned by media company ARN.

In November 2021, Power FM, along with other stations owned by Grant Broadcasters, were acquired by ARN. This deal will allow Grant's stations, including Power FM, to access ARN's iHeartRadio platform in regional areas. The deal was completed on 4 January 2022. It is expected the Power FM Network stations will integrate with ARN's KIIS Network, but will retain their current names according to the press release from ARN.

== Stations ==
Name	City	Frequency
Power FM Bega Bay (2EEE)	South Coast, New South Wales	104.3 FM; 102.5 FM
Power FM 98.1 (2VLY)	Upper Hunter Valley	98.1 FM
Power FM 94.9 (2WSK)	Shoalhaven & Southern Highlands, New South Wales	94.9 FM
Power FM 103.1 (3BBA)	Ballarat, Victoria	103.1 FM
Power FM SA (5EZY)	Adelaide Hills, Murraylands, Victor Harbor	98.7 FM; 100.3 FM; 99.7 FM
