= Power FM Canary Islands =

PowerON FM

Spain
- Broadcast area: Worldwide
- Frequencies: 99.2 & 92.2 FM Lanzarote

Programming
- Format: CHR

History
- First air date: 22 October 1995

Links
- Website: https://poweron.fm/

Power FM, now known as PowerON FM, is an English language radio station that broadcasts around the world.

Power FM began broadcasting in October 1995 using a small 1 W FM transmitter on a roof in Los Gigantes. Over the years, it became the largest English speaking radio station in Spain. At the height of success of the station, the website had over 2,000,000 hits every month, with webcams, studios on all the major Canary Islands, and 24-hour broadcasting.

The station was sold to a private firm in 2006, and it closed on June 30, 2010. In 2013, the station returned to the air with a team of former presenters.

== Early days ==
On 22 October 1995, Power FM began broadcasting on 91.6 FM to the village of Los Gigantes in southwest Tenerife. Its founder, Gavin Watson, hosted the first program. At its start, the station was based in the back room of an electronics shop.

Within two years, coverage had expanded to the entire south coast of Tenerife, including Los Cristianos.

== Network expansion ==
In 2001, Power FM was broadcasting to Tenerife, La Gomera, and Gran Canaria, and in 2002 it launched in Lanzarote, giving it the most English-language radio coverage in the Canaries. At this time, the station went through a period of rebranding, dropping the former slogan "Your Friendly Radio Station" for the new one, "Seven Islands, One Station". In 2003, because some Gran Canaria areas could not receive the station, two additional transmitter sites were set up to expand the network.

== 2006 re-launch ==
In 2006, Power FM was bought by Kaldec Investments S.L. and the station developed new studios in Tenerife, Lanzarote, and Gran Canaria.

Power FM also set up a classic hits station called Gold FM.

On the 30 June 2010, the station ceased broadcasting and went off air for a period of three years.

== Return to air ==
In 2012, former members of the team were in discussion about restarting the station in an internet only format, using the station as a test for a syndication platform. In early 2013, the station returned to airwaves in Lanzarote and Fuerteventura, and shortly afterwards in Tenerife and the western Canary Islands.

The station renamed itself to PowerON FM in 2013, in partnership with TravelON.WORLD.

Both stations operated independently of one another, with separate marketing and production teams.

The Tenerife operation came to an end in the summer of 2024, with the Lanzarote station remaining on air across the eastern Canary Islands to this day.

== Slogans / taglines ==
- 1995 - 2001: Your Friendly Radio Station
- 2001 - 2005: Seven Islands, One Station
- 2005 - 2010: The Canaries Best Music Variety
- 2012 - current: Music Too Good to Turn Down

== Programming & current presenters ==
PowerON FM has a diverse mix of presenters and programming including: Danny Looker, Paul Baker, Jules Weakley, Spencer James, David Gainford, Dave Adams, Mark Dodson, Si Kennett, Craig Trapps, Richard Spinks, Chicane (musician), and Paul Van Dyk, Emma Scott and Adam Meggison.

PowerON FM also broadcasts syndicated radio programmes such as Airplay40 with Spencer James, The Daily Mix, Go retro, and Sister Bliss.

== Previous presenters ==
Tenerife presenters Neil Breakwell, Mel Faulkner, Dave Scott, Roscoe, and Adi Benson.

Previous original presenters have included: Andy Grey (Now on Nova Radio North East), Carl Hartley (Now at Lakeland Radio and Radio Wave 96.5), Gillian King, Bob Preston, Chris Larkman, Theresa Willson, Keith Holden, Rob "That Man" Astley, "Pony" Paul Marley, Mack Ballantyne, Paul Webb, Helga Ekdahl, Juan the Man, Martin Allen, Simon Reiterbund (also known as Simon Ritter), Roy England, Heather Richardson, Grant Davis and Steve Christian (Ken Burkitt), Ricky Porter, Dominic James, Dawnie D, Val Richardson, Gordon King, Katy Kennedy, Pete Quilty, Hollie Bourne, Eddie Hastings, Adam Marks, Kim Robson, John Sharples, Steve Gerald, Mike Smith, Steve Fletcher, Rick O'Shay, Phil Crean, Steve Sommers, and Angela Blackburn.

Power FM also rebroadcast some programmes from BBC World Service.
