= 2ST =

Coordinates: 34.859842°S 150.571401°E

- Nowra, New South Wales; Australia
- Broadcast area: South Coast and Southern Tablelands
- Frequency: 91.7 MHz
- Branding: 2ST

Ownership
- Owner: ARN; (South Coast & Tablelands Broadcasting Pty Ltd)
- Sister stations: Power FM 94.9

History
- First air date: 1972
- Former frequencies: 1215 kHz (Bowral, 1979–1999); 999 kHz (Nowra, 1972–2021)
- Call sign meaning: 2South Coast and Tablelands

Technical information
- Repeaters: 102.9 MHz Bowral; 106.7 MHz Ulladulla

Links
- Website: 2st.com.au

2ST is a commercial radio station that commenced broadcasting in 1972. It is owned by ARN. 2ST was an AM radio station serving the Shoalhaven and Southern Tablelands regions of New South Wales, Australia, broadcasting on the frequency 91.7 FM Nowra to the Bay & Basin + 106.7 FM Ulladulla & Surrounds and 102.9 in the Southern Highlands MHz. The "ST" suffix denotes the "South Coast and Tablelands" area that is the station's coverage area.

== History ==
Over the years 2ST has improved the quality of broadcast signal in its coverage area by adding repeater transmitter services - FM 91.7 MHz Nowra, FM 102.9 MHz Bowral and FM 106.7 MHz Ulladulla.

The Bowral transmitter was originally 1215 kHz AM when it began in 1979; in 1999 it was converted to FM 102.9 MHz. Alternate local programming, such as the 2ST "Highlands" Breakfast and Morning Programs are broadcast from the 2ST Bowral Studio exclusively for the Southern Tablelands audience. All other programming comes from the 2ST main studio in North Nowra.

In the late 1980s a supplementary FM licence was granted to 2ST and the sister station Power FM 94.9 was launched. Power FM 94.9 broadcasts from the same premises as 2ST in North Nowra. Several announcers have moved back and forth between the two stations.

On 1 March 2021, 2ST switched off its AM transmitter on 999 kHz. 8 months later, in November 2021, 2ST, along with other stations owned by Grant Broadcasters, were acquired by the Australian Radio Network. This deal will allow Grant's stations, including 2ST, to access ARN's iHeartRadio platform in regional areas. The deal was finalised on 4 January 2022. It is expected 2ST will integrate with ARN's Pure Gold Network, but will retain its current name according to the press release from ARN.

== On-air schedule ==
=== Weekdays ===
Show	DJ/s	Time
Better Music & More of it		12:00am to 6:00am
*Breakfast	Charles Maxwell	6:00am to 9:00am
*Mornings	Graeme Day	9:00am to 12:00pm
**Totally 80's Lunch	All 80's	12:00pm to 1pm
**Afternoons	Kev Marsh	1:00pm to 4:00pm
JAM NATION; With Jonesy & Amanda		4:00pm to 7:00pm
The Christian O'Connell Show		7:00pm to 8:00pm

=== Saturdays ===
Show	Time
Better Music & More of it Overnight	12:00am to 8:00am
Morning Glory with Matty Johns	8:00am to 9:00am
Charles Maxwell Better Music & More of it	9:00am to 2pm
'This Week in Music with Jason Staveley'	3:00pm to 6:00pm
Weekends Better Music & More of it Party Mix	6:00pm to 12:00am

=== Sundays ===
Show	Time
'Better Music & more of it – Party Mix'	12:00am till 7am
'This Week in Music with Jason Staveley'	7:00am to 10.00am
'Kev Marsh Better Music & More of it'	10:00am to 3.00pm
Better Music & More of it	3:00pm to 6.00pm
Better Music & More of it	6:00pm to 12.00am

- Local newsroom: Peter Andrea

== Previous 2ST announcers ==
- Steve Anderson
- Donn Berghofer
- Steve Blanda
- Paul Bongiorno
- Larry Bonser
- Gary Boyce
- Mike Byrne
- Paul Cashmere
- John Comber
- Greg Clarke
- Pete Diskon
- Geoff Field
- Brendan Forde
- Steve Fox
- Bruce Goldberg
- Chris Jackson
- David Lumsden
- Barry Mac
- Rick Machin
- Andrew Ogilvie
- Greg Pace
- Murray Peters
- Barry Sanders
- Barry Sandry
- Trevor Sinclair
- Mark Spurway
- Dave Stretton
- Brenton 'Thommo' Thompson
- Greg Toohey (deceased)
- Jamie Walter
- Glenn Stolzenhein
- Pete Brandtman
- Ian Holland
- Pete Holland
- Graham French (Local News)

== Current 2ST Announcers ==
- Charles Maxwell
- Graeme Day
- Kev Marsh
