= The Southern Star (newspaper, Bega, New South Wales) =

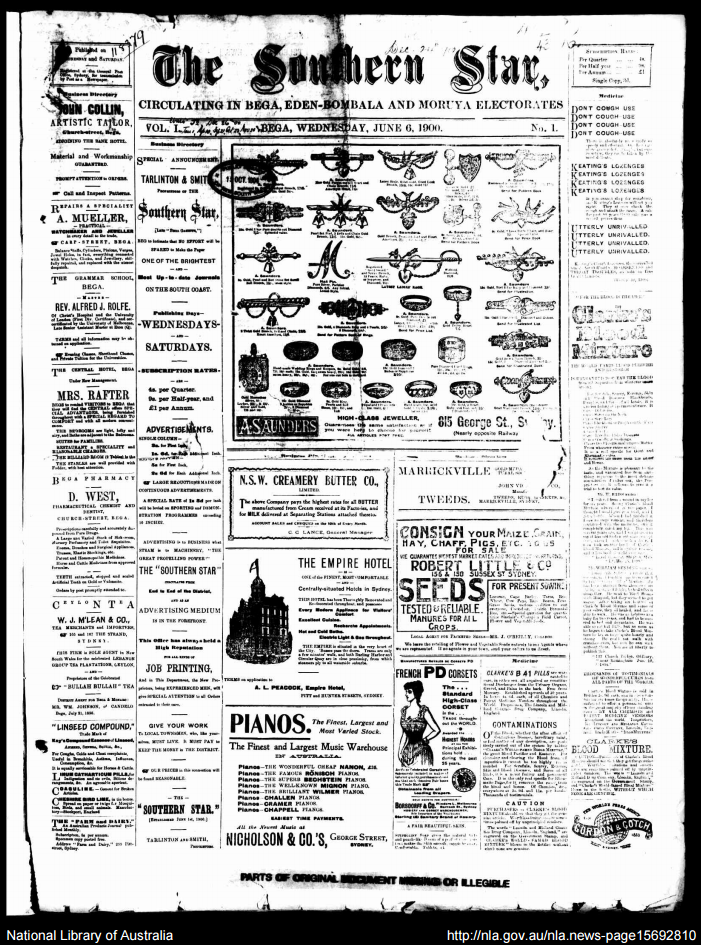
Front page of the Southern Star on 6 June 1900

The Southern Star was a bi-weekly English language newspaper published on Wednesday and Saturdays in Bega, New South Wales, Australia. It was previously published as The Bega Gazette and County of Auckland Advertiser, and The Bega Gazette and Eden District or Southern Coast Advertiser.

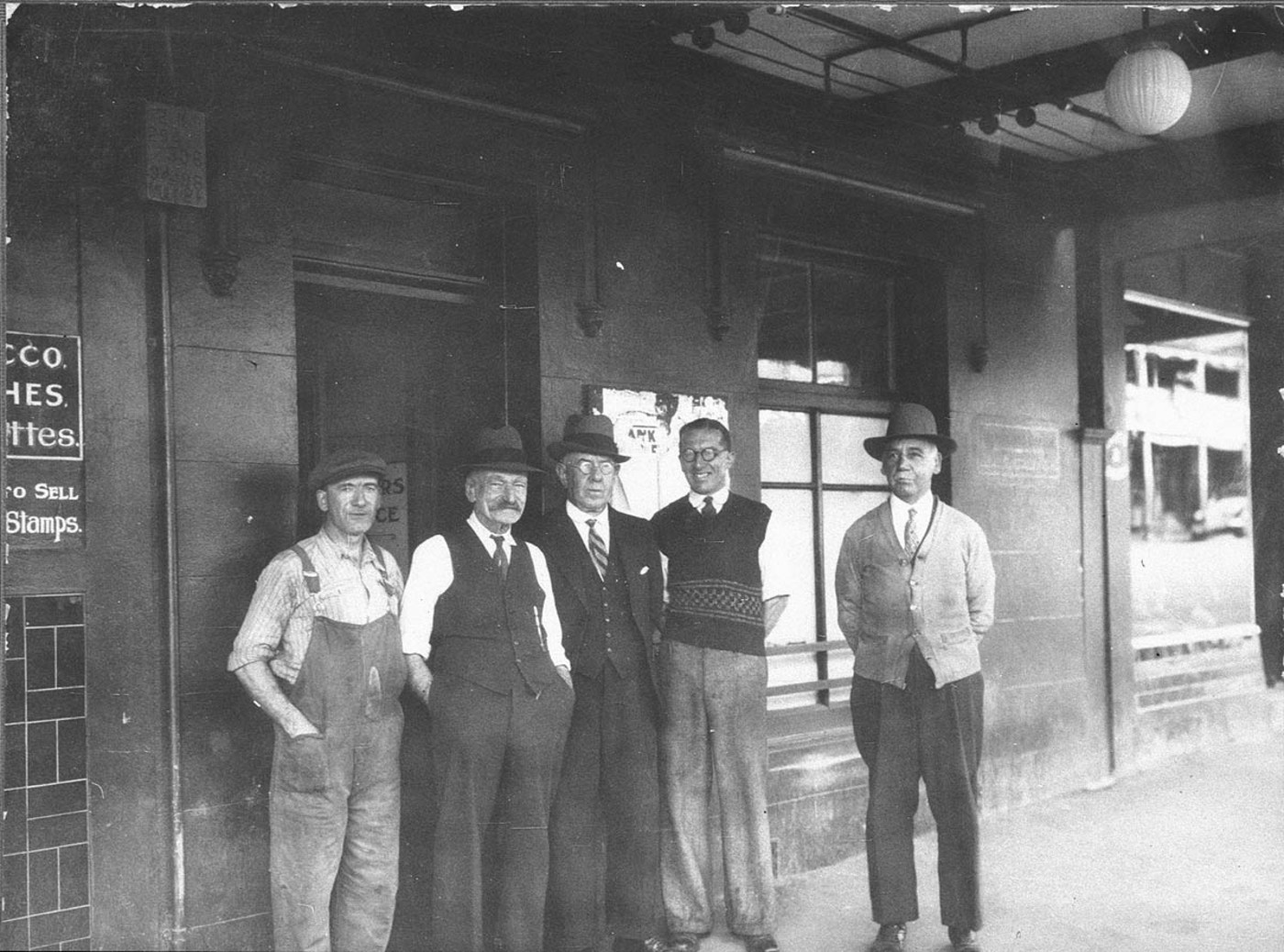
L to R: Trevor Prescott, Alf Prescott, Walter Archibald Smith (Editor), Bill Jardine, Arthur Moss, Southern Star newspaper office, Carp Street

== Newspaper history ==
The Bega Gazette and County of Auckland Advertiser, also known as The Bega Gazette, was a weekly newspaper first published in December 1864 by proprietor R. W. Sharpe. On 1 July 1865 the masthead changed to The Bega Gazette and Eden District or South Coast Advertiser. In 1900 Tarlington and Smith bought The Bega Gazette from William Henry Braine immediately changing the name to The Southern Star. The newspaper merged with the Bega Standard and Bega Budget to form Bega District News on 2 October 1923.

== Digitisation ==
The Bega Gazette and County of Auckland Advertiser, The Bega Gazette and Eden District or Southern Coast Advertiser, and The Southern Star have been digitised as part of the Australian Newspapers Digitisation Program of the National Library of Australia.

== See also ==
- List of newspapers in Australia
- List of newspapers in New South Wales
