= 3BA =

Coordinates: 37.5601°S 143.8584°E

- Ballarat, Victoria, Australia; Australia
- Broadcast area: Ballarat, Australia
- Frequency: 102.3 MHz FM
- Branding: 3BA

Programming
- Language: English
- Format: Classic hits, Talk radio, News, sport

Ownership
- Owner: ARN; (Radio Ballarat Pty Ltd)
- Sister stations: Power FM

History
- Call sign meaning: 3 – Victoria Radio BAllarat

Links
- Website: 3BA

3BA (call sign: 3RBA) is a commercial radio station in Ballarat, Victoria, Australia broadcasting on the FM band on a frequency of 102.3 MHz.

Together with its sister station Power FM, it is owned by ARN. The station plays "Great Classics & Today's Favourites", which ranges from the 80s to Today.

3BA moved from AM (1314) to FM (102.3) on 5 May 1998.

Today, 3BA's old 1314 frequency currently relays RSN 927 whose signal also travels to Ararat, Colac, Hamilton, Stawell and Warrnambool.

In November 2021, 3BA, along with other stations owned by Grant Broadcasters, were acquired by the Australian Radio Network. This deal will allow Grant's stations, including 3BA, to access ARN's iHeartRadio platform in regional areas. The deal was finalized on 4 January 2022. It is expected 3BA will integrate with ARN's Pure Gold Network, but will retain its current name according to the press release from ARN.

== On-Air Schedule ==
=== Weekdays ===
- 12:00am–06:00am – Ballarat's 102.3FM 3BA
- 06:00am–10:00am – 'The Big Show' with Paul 'PT' Taylor
- 10:00am–12:00pm – 'Ballarat Today' with Brett Macdonald
- 12:00pm–02:00pm – 'Lunchtime with Jules'
- 02:00pm–04:00pm – 'Afternoons with Josh Olek'
- 04:00pm–07:00pm – 'Jam Nation with Jonesy and Amanda'
- 07:00pm–08:00pm – 'The Christian O'Connell Show'
- 08:00pm–12:00am – Ballarat's 102.3FM 3BA

=== Saturdays ===
- 12:00am–06:00am – Ballarat's 102.3FM 3BA
- 06:00am–12:00pm – Frank Clark (Lifestyle Programs)
- 03:00pm-6:00pm - This Week in Music with Jason Staveley
- 06:00pm–12:00am – Ballarat's 102.3FM 3BA

=== Sundays ===
- 12:00am–12:00am – Ballarat's 102.3FM 3BA
- 07:00am-10:00am - This Week in Music with Jason Staveley

== Past 3BA announcers ==
- Garry West
- Glenn McFarlane
- Glenn Driscoll
- Phil Weir
- Mike Cooper
- Dudley Moore
- Randall Smith
- Adrian Lee
- Geoff Nott
- Jim Griffin
- Mike Walden
- Craig Moore
- Stephen Whittaker
- Anthony Kierce
- Craig Meddings
- Tony McManus
- Mal Lewis
- Paul Cook
- Brett Macdonald
- Vaughan Jones
- Tony Dean
- Kathy Bedford
- Leigh Ryan
- Richard Stewart
- Bill Freeman
- John Price
- Tom Bennett
- Rob Hammer
- Rob McCasker
- Ben Rogers
- Ed Cowlishaw
- Craig Blomeley
- Mike Menner
- Peter Grace
- Sean Cullen
- Ralph Bain
- Seb Claassen
- Dan Lonergan
- Gabrielle Hodson
- Garrath Cockerell
- Dean Pickering
- Alex Withers
- David Dalkin
- Geordi Norton
- Amy Hegedus

== Program Guide (Monday to Friday) ==
Breakfast (Big Show) 6am to 10am	Ballarat Today 10am to 12pm	Lunchtime 12pm to 2pm	Afternoons 2pm to 4pm	Jam Nation 4pm to 7pm The Christian O'Connell Show 7pm to 8pm
PT (Paul Taylor)	Brett Macdonald	Jules	Josh Olek	
