= 5MU =

Murray Bridge, South Australia; Australia
- Broadcast area: Murray Bridge RA1
- Frequency: 96.3 MHz
- Branding: Better Music & More of It - 5MU

Programming
- Languages: English
- Format: Adult hits
- Network: Pure Gold Network

Ownership
- Owner: Australian Radio Network; (Radio Murray Bridge Pty Ltd)
- Sister stations: Power FM SA

History
- First air date: 16 September 1934
- Former frequencies: 1450 kHz (1934–1978); 1458 kHz (1978–1988); 1125 kHz (1988–2021)

Technical information
- Licensing authority: ACMA
- ERP: 20 kW
- Transmitter coordinates: 35°9′7″S 139°12′51″E
- Repeater(s): 97.1 MHz Victor Harbor (1 kW ERP); 94.3 MHz Mount Barker, Adelaide Hills (1 kW ERP)

Links
- Public licence information: Profile
- Website: 5mu.com.au

5MU is an adult hits-formatted commercial radio station based in Murray Bridge, South Australia. Broadcasting on 96.3 MHz, the station has repeaters at Victor Harbor on 97.1 MHz and in the Adelaide Hills on 94.3 MHz.

== History ==
5MU began after master engineer and World War I signaller Frank Miller was granted a broadcast license and began operation on 16 September 1934 as South Australia's second-ever radio station, with a wooden mast and antenna system. It initially operated on evenings seven days a week and during the day on Wednesday, Saturday and Sunday. A controlling interest was acquired by Advertiser Newspapers Ltd, publishers of The Advertiser and owners of 5AD in Adelaide, in early 1935; 5MU aired some of 5AD's programs.

The station is known to be South Australia's longest serving callsign, being continuously known as 5MU right through their various frequency changes and as of September 2024 they run on FM.

In the 1970s, to comply with the Geneva Frequency Plan of 1975 in which Australia adopted in 1978, 5MU changed frequencies from 1450 kHz to 1458kHz. In about 1988, 5MU switched over to the 1125 kHz frequency from their original 1458 kHz frequency due to the introduction of C-QUAM AM Stereo.

The station was purchased from South East Telecasters in 1998 by Australian Regional Broadcasters, that company's first purchase outside its Western Australia base. The company had already planned to introduce an FM station to the area; Power FM launched in 2000, by which time the station was owned by Grant Broadcasters.

In 2021, after consultation from the region, 5MU officially converted to the FM band and started broadcasting on 96.3 MHz, with repeaters on the South Coast (north of Port Elliot) on 97.1 MHz and in the Adelaide Hills on 94.3 MHz in the same vein as sister station Power FM SA. The 1125 kHz frequency was switched off after a grace period to let people know to switch over in March 2021.

In November 2021, 5MU, along with other stations owned by Grant Broadcasters, were acquired by the Australian Radio Network. This deal allows Grant's stations, including 5MU, to access ARN's iHeartRadio platform in regional areas. The deal was finalized on 4 January 2022.

== Main programs ==
- Breakfast with Adam and Jennie
- More Music Mornings with Jennie Lenman
- Around SA with Chris Guscott
- Saturday Sports Show
- Jam Nation with Brendan "Jonesy" Jones and Amanda Keller
- The Christian O'Connell Show
- 20/20 Retro Countdown

== Former talent ==
- Anne "Willsy" Wills
- Mark "Dolly" Parton
