= Bawley Point =

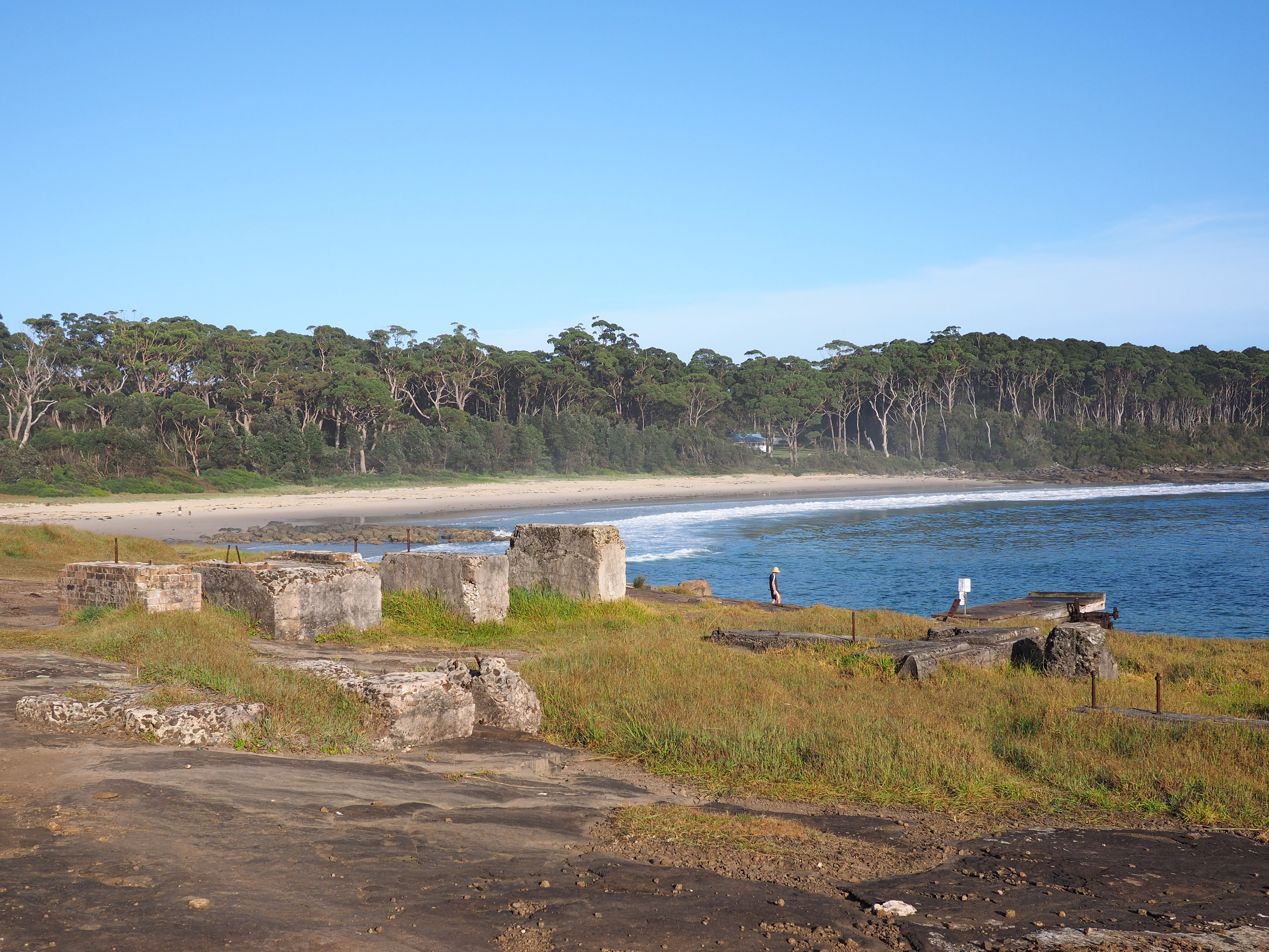
- Remains of the Bawley Point Sawmill and Bawley Point Wharf in 2015

- Coordinates: 35°30′56.25″S 150°23′37.42″E
- Country: Australia
- State: New South Wales
- Region: South Coast
- LGA: City of Shoalhaven
- Location: 111 km (69 mi) E of Canberra; 188 km (117 mi) SW of Sydney

Government
  - State electorate: South Coast
  - Federal division: Gilmore

Population
  - Total: 698 (2016 census)
- Time zone: UTC+10 (AEST)
  - Summer (DST): UTC+11 (AEDT)
- Postcode: 2539
- County: St Vincent
- Parish: Termeil
Localities around Bawley Point
| Termeil | Termeil | Tasman Sea |
| Termeil | Bawley Point | Tasman Sea |
| Cockwhy | Kioloa | Tasman Sea |

Bawley Point is a small coastal hamlet in New South Wales, Australia, in the Shoalhaven with a population of 698 people at the 2016 census. It is located 30 minutes south of Ulladulla, New South Wales, and 30 minutes north of Batemans Bay on the South Coast of NSW. The town's name is believed to be derived from an Aboriginal word meaning "Brown snake". Bawley Point is well known throughout the region for its fine beaches and peak surf conditions. The area is frequented by holiday makers from Canberra and Sydney.

== History ==
On 23 April 1770, James Cook in HMS Endeavour made his first recorded direct observation of indigenous Australians at Brush Island near Bawley Point, noting in his journal: "...and were so near the Shore as to distinguish several people upon the Sea beach they appear'd to be of a very dark or black Colour but whether this was the real colour of their skins or the Clothes they might have on I know not."

On 18 December 1832 Joseph Berryman, overseer at Sydney Stephen's Murramarang land acquisition near Bawley Point, shot dead four Aboriginal Australians in retaliation for the spearing of some cattle. Of those shot, two were an elderly couple and another was a pregnant woman.

Bawley Point had a public school from 1894 to 1909 and 1912 to 1922, classified variously as a "public", "half-time" or "provisional" school.

Bawley Point was threatened during the 2019-20 Bushfire Season, with local fire Chief Charlie Magnuson calling it "the luckiest village on the South Coast".

== Tourism ==
Tourism is a large driver of economic activity in Bawley Point and surrounding areas, with a variety of accommodation options including home stays and caravan parks. Visitors are drawn to the uncrowded beaches as well as nearby National Parks, campgrounds, walking and mountain biking trails. The lakes and lagoons in the surrounding area are popular for photography and bird-watchng.

There are two wineries in the area bring visitors to the area during the Shoalhaven Winter Wine Festival. Visitors can also enjoy fruit picking at two of the local farms.

== Population ==
In the 2016 Census, there were 698 people in Bawley Point. 80.1% of people were born in Australia and 92.3% of people spoke only English at home. The most common responses for religion were No Religion 40.0% and Anglican 24.2%.

== Amenities ==
A number of local businesses operate in Bawley Point, including a small supermarket, specialty shops, a pharmacy and holiday accommodation.

== Transport ==
Bawley Point is served on weekdays by Ulladulla Buslines route 741 twice daily to Kioloa and Ulladulla via Termeil, Tabourie and Burrill Lake. An additional afternoon service runs on school days.

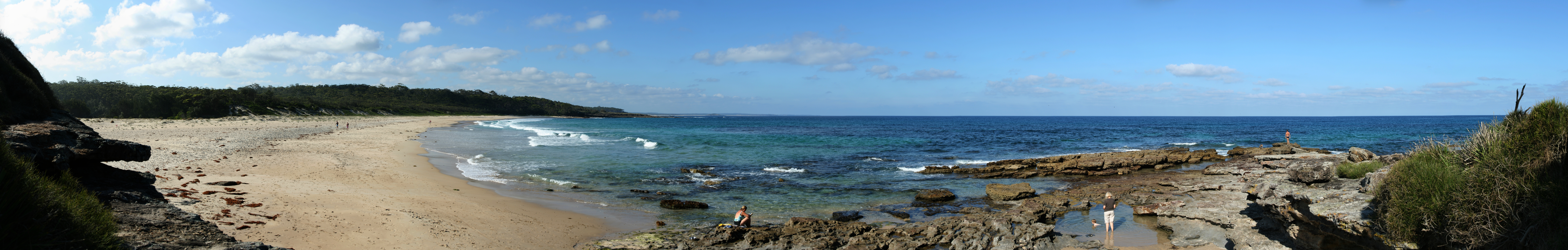
North beach just north of Bawley Point.
