= Tabourie Lake =

- Town
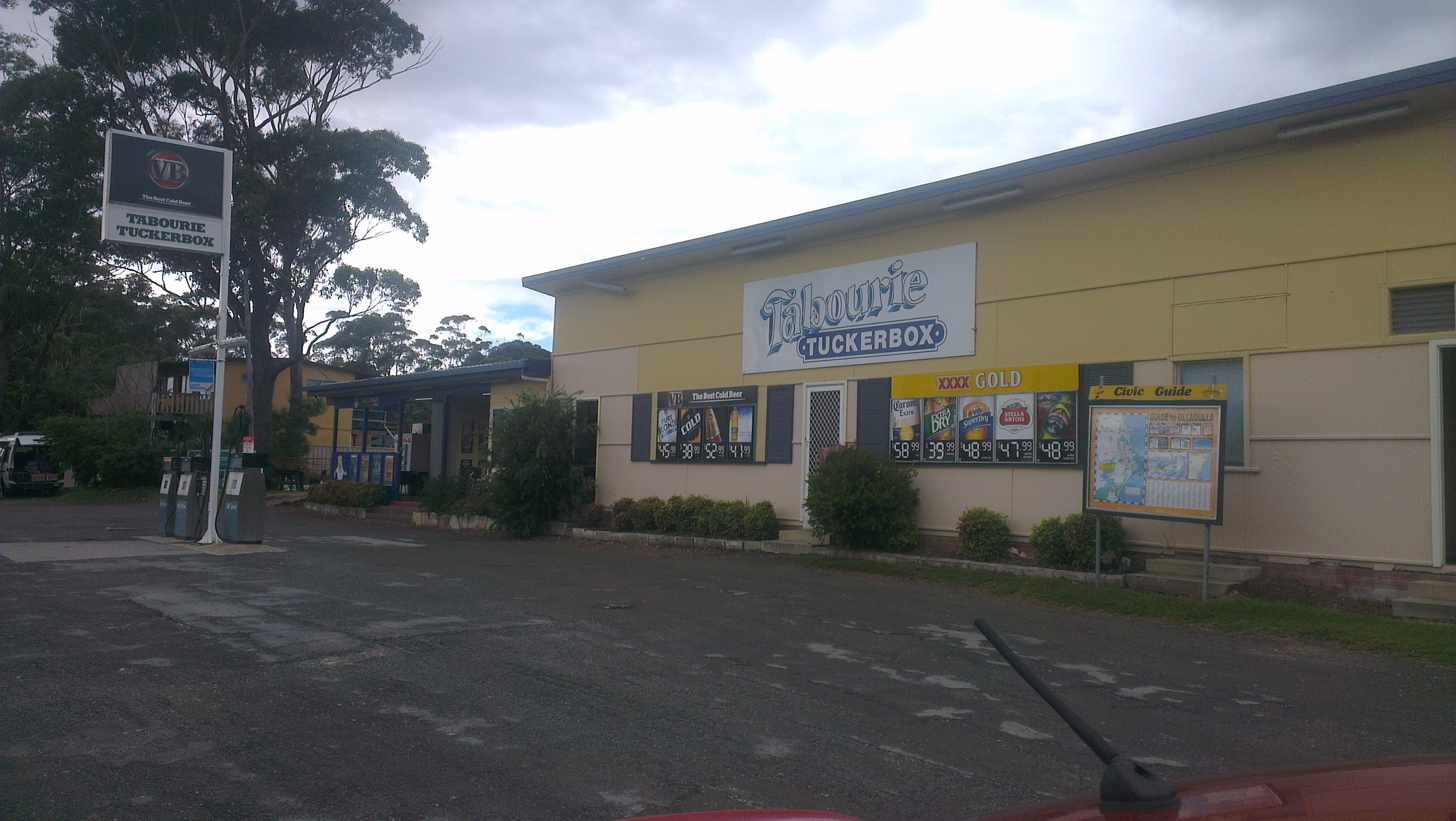
- The Tabourie Tuckerbox service station and general store

- Coordinates: 35°26′55″S 150°24′04″E
- Country: Australia
- State: New South Wales
- Region: South Coast
- LGA: City of Shoalhaven

Government
  - State electorate: South Coast
  - Federal division: Gilmore

Population
  - Total: 670 (UCL 2021)
- Postcode: 2539
- County: St Vincent
- Parish: Woodburn
Localities around Tabourie Lake
Woodburn	Burrill Lake	Dolphin Point
Termeil	Tabourie Lake	Tasman Sea
Termeil	Termeil	Tasman Sea

Tabourie Lake, formerly Toubouree Lake is a small village in the suburb of Lake Tabourie, in the South Coast region of New South Wales, Australia and is within the City of Shoalhaven local government area. The village takes its name from the lagoon formed at the entry of Tabourie Creek into the ocean. Crampton Island lies immediately off shore with access available by foot at low tide. Lake Tabourie is located within Meroo National Park and the bush surrounding the lake is made up of ecologically unique Bangalay Sand Forest. A caravan and camping park is located between the beach and the lake. The village boasts a small museum, opened in 1965 with a collection of local historical exhibits, including fauna, Aboriginal artifacts, and historical furnishings and machinery. The museum and collection was given to the Shoalhaven City Council by its founder Jack Nicholson in 1983.

The village relies on the town of Ulladulla, 11 km (6.8 mi) north and its surrounding district for many public services and employment opportunities. Tabourie Lake is served on weekdays by Ulladulla Bus Lines. Route 741 runs twice daily south to Kioloa and north to Ulladulla. An additional afternoon service is provided on school days.
