= Power FM Bega Bay =

- Batemans Bay, New South Wales; Australia
- Broadcast area: South Coast, New South Wales
- Frequency: 104.3 MHz FM
- Branding: Power FM Bega Bay

Programming
- Format: Contemporary hit radio
- Affiliations: Power FM

Ownership
- Owner: ARN; (East Coast Radio Pty. Ltd.)
- Sister stations: 2EC

History
- First air date: 24 September 1997

Technical information
- Transmitter coordinates: 36.676380°S 149.842596°E
- Repeater: 102.5 MHz FM Bega

Links
- Website: Power FM 102.5

Power FM Bega Bay (call sign: 2EEE) is a commercial radio station available on the New South Wales south coast, covering the areas surrounding Bega, Batemans Bay, Narooma, Merimbula, Eden and Moruya.

The station broadcasts on two frequencies in order to reach the whole Bega license area- 102.5 FM, covering the Bega Valley local government area, and 104.3 FM, covering the Eurobodalla Shire.

Power FM has local announcers and a local news reader, providing local content 7 days a week. National News is on the hour, 6am to 6pm and provided from Sydney.

In November 2021, Power FM, along with other stations owned by Grant Broadcasters, were acquired by the Australian Radio Network. This deal will allow Grant's stations, including Power FM, to access ARN's iHeartRadio platform in regional areas. The deal was finalized on January 4, 2022. It is expected Power FM will integrate with ARN's KIIS Network, but will retain its current name according to the press release from ARN.

In May 2024, Power FM Bega Bay along with sister station 2EC and KIX, moved studios.

In July 2025, Breakfast Co-Host, Patrick Hutley departed after 6 years in the position. He left to Wave FM in Wollongong, another ARN owned station in New South Wales.

After Hutley's departure, it was announced that Leisha Brodyk would take over as co-host.

Brodyk departed the role in December 2025, after 3 months, to NEWFM in Wollongong.

In February 2026, Erin Govers was announced as the new co-host. Erin was previously the Breakfast Announcer on Kool FM in North Queensland.

== Stations ==
102.5 Bega Valley Shire
104.3 Eurobodalla Shire

== On Air Schedule ==
Monday to Friday:

- 6:00am-9:00am: Erin & Brad for Breakfast
- 9:00am-10:00am: Ad Free 50
- 10:00am-1:00pm: Workday Shuffle with Aidan
- 1:00pm-5:00pm: Sammy
- 5:00pm-7:00pm: Will & Woody

Saturday:

- 4:00pm-6:00pm: iHeart Countdown with Mikey

== See also ==
List of radio stations in Australia
