= 93.7 Edge FM =

93.7 Edge FM (2BAR)
Bega Valley Shire, New South Wales; Australia
- Broadcast area: Bega Valley
- Frequency: FM: 93.7 MHz

Programming
- Language: English

Ownership
- Owner: Bega Access Radio Incorporated

History
- First air date: March 1993

Technical information
- Licensing authority: ACMA
- ERP: 1,000 watts
- Transmitter coordinates: 36.6593°S 149.9055°E

Links
- Public licence information: Profile
- Website: Edge FM Website

93.7 Edge FM is a community radio station broadcast in the Bega Valley Shire of NSW, Australia. It is not to be confused with Edge FM 102.1.
