= Power FM (South Australia) =

Power FM (5EZY)
- Murray Bridge, South Australia; Australia
- Broadcast area: Murray Bridge RA1
- Frequency: 98.7 MHz
- Branding: Your Home of the Hits - Power FM

Programming
- Language: English
- Format: Hot AC
- Affiliations: Power FM

Ownership
- Owner: Australian Radio Network; (Radio Murray Bridge Pty Ltd)
- Sister stations: 5MU

History
- First air date: 12 May 2000

Technical information
- Licensing authority: ACMA
- ERP: 20 kW
- Transmitter coordinates: 35°07′01″S 139°16′23″E
- Repeaters: 99.7 MHz Victor Harbor; 100.3 MHz Adelaide Hills

Links
- Website: powerfmsa.com.au

Power FM (ACMA call sign: 5EZY) is a Hot Adult Contemporary (Hot AC)-formatted commercial radio station based in Murray Bridge, South Australia. Broadcasting on 98.7 MHz, the station has repeaters at Victor Harbor on 99.7 MHz and in the Adelaide Hills on 100.3 MHz.

== History ==
The station launched on 12 May 2000 with the South Coast and Adelaide Hills repeater licenses being granted on 7 March 2002 and 21 October 2005 respectively. At this time, the station was owned by Grant Broadcasters.

The Adelaide Hills and South Coast repeater stations were set up due to terrain coverage issues from the original 98.7 site on Gifford Hill for parts of the Adelaide Hills and along a majority of the Fleurieu Peninsula, areas that sister station 5MU, at that time on 1125 kHz AM, was able to cover with ease and are also part of the Murray Bridge RA1 ACMA license area. These repeaters run at 1 kW ERP each, supplementing the 20 kW ERP output from the Gifford Hill transmission site.

In November 2021, Power FM, along with other stations owned by Grant Broadcasters, were acquired by the Australian Radio Network. This deal will allow Grant's stations, including Power FM, to access ARN's iHeartRadio platform in regional areas. The deal was finalized on 4 January 2022.

== Programming ==
- Power FM Breakfast with Craig & Chels
- The Wright Stuff with Katie
- The Ride Home with Geordi
- Will and Woody
- iHeartRadio Countdown
