= Bega, New South Wales =

Bega Worerker
- Town
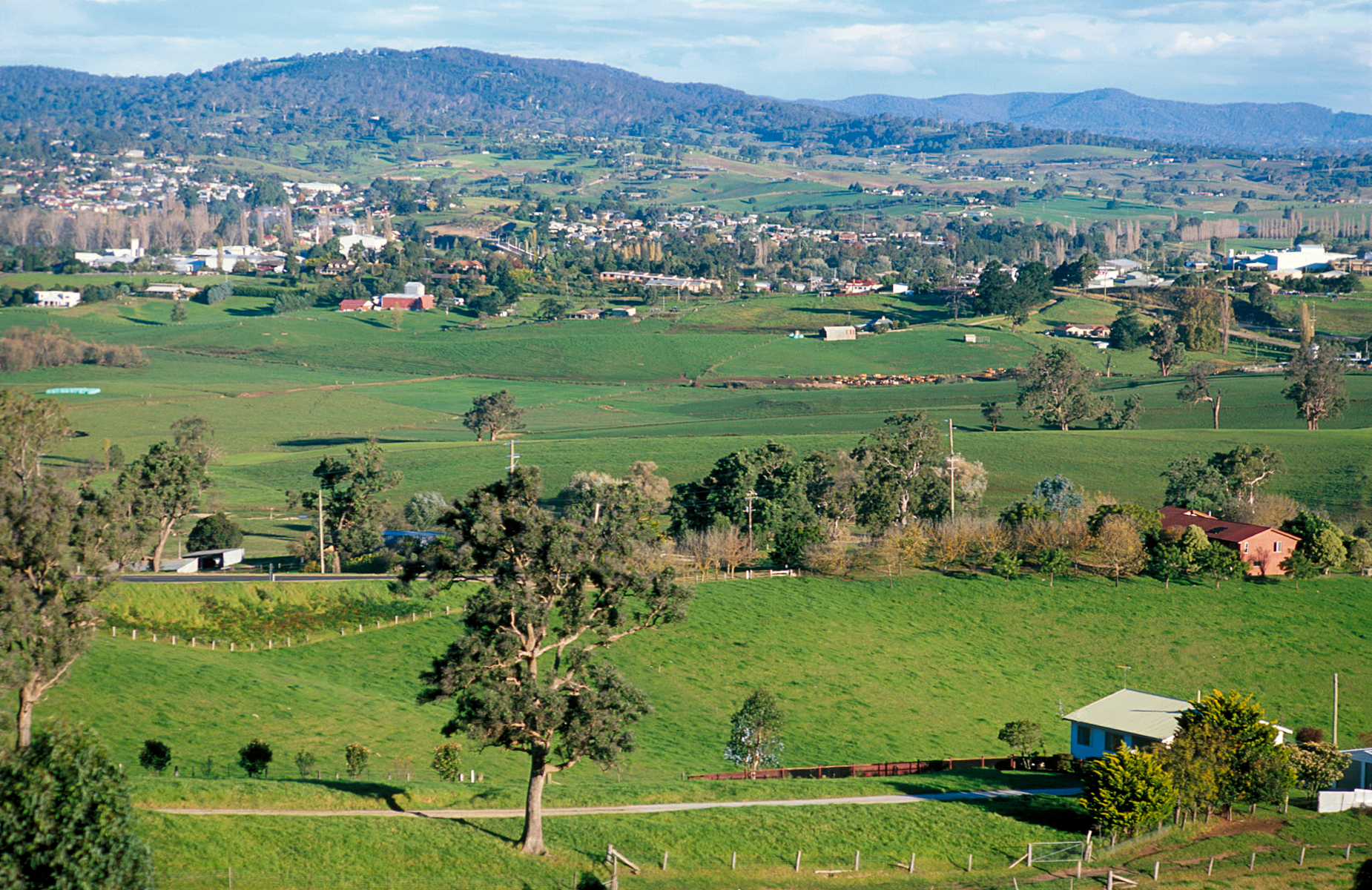
- Panorama of Bega and the Bega Valley

- Coordinates: 36°40′S 149°50′E
- Country: Australia
- State: New South Wales
- LGA: Bega Valley Shire
- Location: 421 km (262 mi) SSW of Sydney; 613 km (381 mi) ENE of Melbourne; 225 km (140 mi) ESE of Canberra; 77 km (48 mi) S of Narooma; 55 km (34 mi) N of Eden
- Established: 1851

Government
  - State electorate: Bega
  - Federal division: Eden-Monaro
- Elevation: 51 m (167 ft)

Population
  - Total: 4,368 (2021 census)
- Postcode: 2550
- Mean max temp: 22.3 °C (72.1 °F)
- Mean min temp: 8.3 °C (46.9 °F)
- Annual rainfall: 860.5 mm (33.88 in)

Bega (/biːɡə/) is a town in the south-east of New South Wales, Australia, in the Bega Valley Shire. It is considered the economic and commercial centre of the Bega Valley.

== Etymology ==
One claim is that the place name Bega is derived from a local Thawa word meaning "big camping ground". Another claim is that it is a corruption of the word "bika" from one of the local Yuin–Kuric languages, meaning "beautiful". The local Aboriginal name for Bega before colonisation was Worerker.

== History and description ==
The Bega region was inhabited by the Yuin people for thousands of years before Europeans arrived in the area. The clan whose country occupied the Bega vicinity were called the Worerkerbrim mitte.

Bega lies at the foot of Mumbulla Mountain, named after a Yuin elder King Jack Mumbulla, whose traditional Aboriginal name is Biamanga. The surrounding National Park is named after him as Biamanga National Park. Bega lies within the southern range of the Coastal Valley Grassy Woodlands. The surrounding Bega Valley supports Lowland Grassy Woodland, a rain-shadow grassy woodland community characterised by an open eucalypt canopy and grassy understorey.

The first European to come near the area was George Bass, who explored the region's coastline in December 1797 as part of his broader explorations of the Australian coast. William Tarlinton was the first European to explore the area on foot, arriving in 1829. He returned in the early 1830s and settled there, starting a cattle farm. Others who arrived in the area around the same time were the Imlay brothers, who also began farming there. Their name has since been preserved in the form of Mount Imlay National Park. Live cattle were transported to Sydney for a time, to be supplemented by tallow and hides in the early 1840s. Beef and dairy farming were carried on in the area through the 1840s, and many towns were surveyed in the 1850s.

The town of Bega itself was laid out and gazetted in December 1851. Located to the north of its present location, repeated flooding later resulted in its relocation to the higher ground south of the river. Dairy farming expanded in the region quickly throughout the 1860s, overtaking cattle farming as the predominant industry. In 1858, Tathra was used as a port for the transport of products to Sydney, and the Illawarra Steam Company was established. In 1861–62, Tathra Wharf was constructed, which allowed for the further growth and expansion of the dairy industry.

The region received a further boost in the late 1870s when gold was discovered in the Bermagui area. The Bermagui gold rush followed quickly in 1880. Two years later, in 1882, the Municipality of Bega was created. The Bega Dairy Cooperative Limited was set up in the late 1890s.

Bega is now well known for its cheese which is manufactured by the food and drinks company Bega Group. Their products are exported around the world and distributed across Australia and are available in most supermarkets and general stores.

Notable local landmarks are Bega Court House and Rosevear Jeweller's shopfront, which are both listed on the Register of the National Estate. The courthouse was built in 1881 and consists of rendered brick and iron roofs. The Rosevear shop is in Carp Street and was established circa 1899. It is listed as a notable example of Victorian commercial designers.

After years of planning, the shopping mall in Bega was built. The Sapphire Marketplace was opened on 2 December 2011. In 2022 the Sapphire Marketplace was sold by its developer, Woolworths Group, for $54.05 million to a private investor. After the sale, Sapphire Marketplace was rebranded as Bega Village in October 2022.

== Heritage listings ==
Bega has a number of heritage-listed sites, including:

- 21 Auckland Street: CBC Bank Building

== Population ==
Historical population
Year	Pop.	±%
1921	1,933	—
1933	2,277	+17.8%
1947	2,856	+25.4%
1954	3,518	+23.2%
1961	3,858	+9.7%
1966	3,925	+1.7%
1971	4,159	+6.0%
1976	4,253	+2.3%
1981	4,388	+3.2%
1986	4,294	−2.1%
1991	4,202	−2.1%
1996	4,190	−0.3%
2001	4,385	+4.7%
2006	4,537	+3.5%
2011	4,155	−8.4%
2016	4,141	−0.3%
2021	4,368	+5.5%
Source: Australian Bureau of Statistics data.

According to the 2021 census, there were 5,013 people in Bega.

- Aboriginal and Torres Strait Islander people made up 6.7% of the population.
- 82.3% of people were born in Australia. The next most common country of birth was England at 2.2%.
- 87.3% of people only spoke English at home.
- The most common responses for religion were No Religion 43.8% Anglican 17% and Catholic 16.8%

== Climate ==
Bega has a temperate oceanic climate (Cfb) with mild to warm summers and cool to cold winters with frequent foehn winds. Nights are relatively cool all year round due to its valley location at a southern latitude, and frost is a regular occurrence in the winter months. The town gets 85.3 clear days annually, largely in the winter and spring months. Diurnal range is particularly high from mid winter to early spring, especially for a near-coastal location. The lowest temperature on record was an impressive −8.1 °C (17.4 °F) on 16 July 1970 at the Newtown Road site.

Climate data for Bega (Newtown Road, 1907–1994, rainfall 1879–2022); 50 m AMSL; 36.69° S, 149.84° E
Month	Jan	Feb	Mar	Apr	May	Jun	Jul	Aug	Sep	Oct	Nov	Dec	Year
Record high °C (°F)	44.5 (112.1)	42.6 (108.7)	41.0 (105.8)	33.9 (93.0)	29.1 (84.4)	23.3 (73.9)	27.5 (81.5)	28.3 (82.9)	36.6 (97.9)	35.7 (96.3)	43.1 (109.6)	43.8 (110.8)	44.5 (112.1)
Mean daily maximum °C (°F)	27.0 (80.6)	27.0 (80.6)	25.7 (78.3)	23.0 (73.4)	19.7 (67.5)	16.9 (62.4)	16.7 (62.1)	18.2 (64.8)	20.5 (68.9)	22.5 (72.5)	24.0 (75.2)	25.9 (78.6)	22.3 (72.1)
Mean daily minimum °C (°F)	14.2 (57.6)	14.5 (58.1)	12.6 (54.7)	8.9 (48.0)	5.5 (41.9)	2.9 (37.2)	1.4 (34.5)	2.6 (36.7)	5.1 (41.2)	8.2 (46.8)	10.7 (51.3)	12.9 (55.2)	8.3 (46.9)
Record low °C (°F)	4.0 (39.2)	5.0 (41.0)	2.5 (36.5)	−2.2 (28.0)	−3.1 (26.4)	−5.9 (21.4)	−8.1 (17.4)	−4.9 (23.2)	−3.6 (25.5)	−1.0 (30.2)	0.6 (33.1)	2.2 (36.0)	−8.1 (17.4)
Average rainfall mm (inches)	80.8 (3.18)	92.1 (3.63)	96.2 (3.79)	69.5 (2.74)	71.9 (2.83)	81.4 (3.20)	51.5 (2.03)	50.5 (1.99)	50.7 (2.00)	67.8 (2.67)	68.4 (2.69)	77.6 (3.06)	860.5 (33.88)
Average rainy days (≥ 1.0mm)	6.5	6.3	6.6	5.5	5.2	5.2	4.0	4.6	5.4	6.8	7.0	6.8	69.9
Average afternoon relative humidity (%)	59	61	59	59	60	61	55	52	52	54	57	58	57
Source: Australian Bureau of Meteorology; Bega (Newtown Road)

Climate data for Bega AWS (1992–2022); 41 m AMSL; 36.67° S, 149.82° E
Month	Jan	Feb	Mar	Apr	May	Jun	Jul	Aug	Sep	Oct	Nov	Dec	Year
Record high °C (°F)	44.6 (112.3)	44.4 (111.9)	40.4 (104.7)	36.5 (97.7)	29.7 (85.5)	24.5 (76.1)	26.3 (79.3)	28.2 (82.8)	36.0 (96.8)	36.8 (98.2)	42.6 (108.7)	42.4 (108.3)	44.6 (112.3)
Mean daily maximum °C (°F)	27.2 (81.0)	26.5 (79.7)	24.8 (76.6)	22.4 (72.3)	19.5 (67.1)	16.8 (62.2)	16.6 (61.9)	17.9 (64.2)	20.2 (68.4)	22.0 (71.6)	23.6 (74.5)	25.1 (77.2)	21.9 (71.4)
Mean daily minimum °C (°F)	15.1 (59.2)	15.0 (59.0)	12.9 (55.2)	9.5 (49.1)	5.7 (42.3)	3.6 (38.5)	2.3 (36.1)	3.2 (37.8)	6.0 (42.8)	8.5 (47.3)	11.4 (52.5)	13.4 (56.1)	8.9 (48.0)
Record low °C (°F)	4.5 (40.1)	6.0 (42.8)	2.9 (37.2)	−0.1 (31.8)	−2.4 (27.7)	−4.3 (24.3)	−4.3 (24.3)	−4.7 (23.5)	−3.0 (26.6)	0.0 (32.0)	0.7 (33.3)	1.9 (35.4)	−4.7 (23.5)
Average rainfall mm (inches)	54.9 (2.16)	83.5 (3.29)	78.7 (3.10)	34.8 (1.37)	50.4 (1.98)	64.5 (2.54)	43.0 (1.69)	33.9 (1.33)	34.4 (1.35)	51.3 (2.02)	64.8 (2.55)	65.8 (2.59)	687.4 (27.06)
Average rainy days (≥ 1.0 mm)	6.6	5.8	6.5	4.6	3.6	4.5	3.4	3.5	4.3	5.9	7.0	6.6	62.3
Average afternoon relative humidity (%)	60	60	59	59	59	58	54	51	53	57	60	60	58
Average dew point °C (°F)	15.5 (59.9)	15.5 (59.9)	13.6 (56.5)	11.2 (52.2)	8.4 (47.1)	5.8 (42.4)	4.2 (39.6)	4.8 (40.6)	7.4 (45.3)	9.6 (49.3)	12.1 (53.8)	13.6 (56.5)	10.1 (50.3)
Source: Australian Bureau of Meteorology (1992–2022)

== Sister cities ==
- Littleton, Colorado, United States of America

== Gallery ==
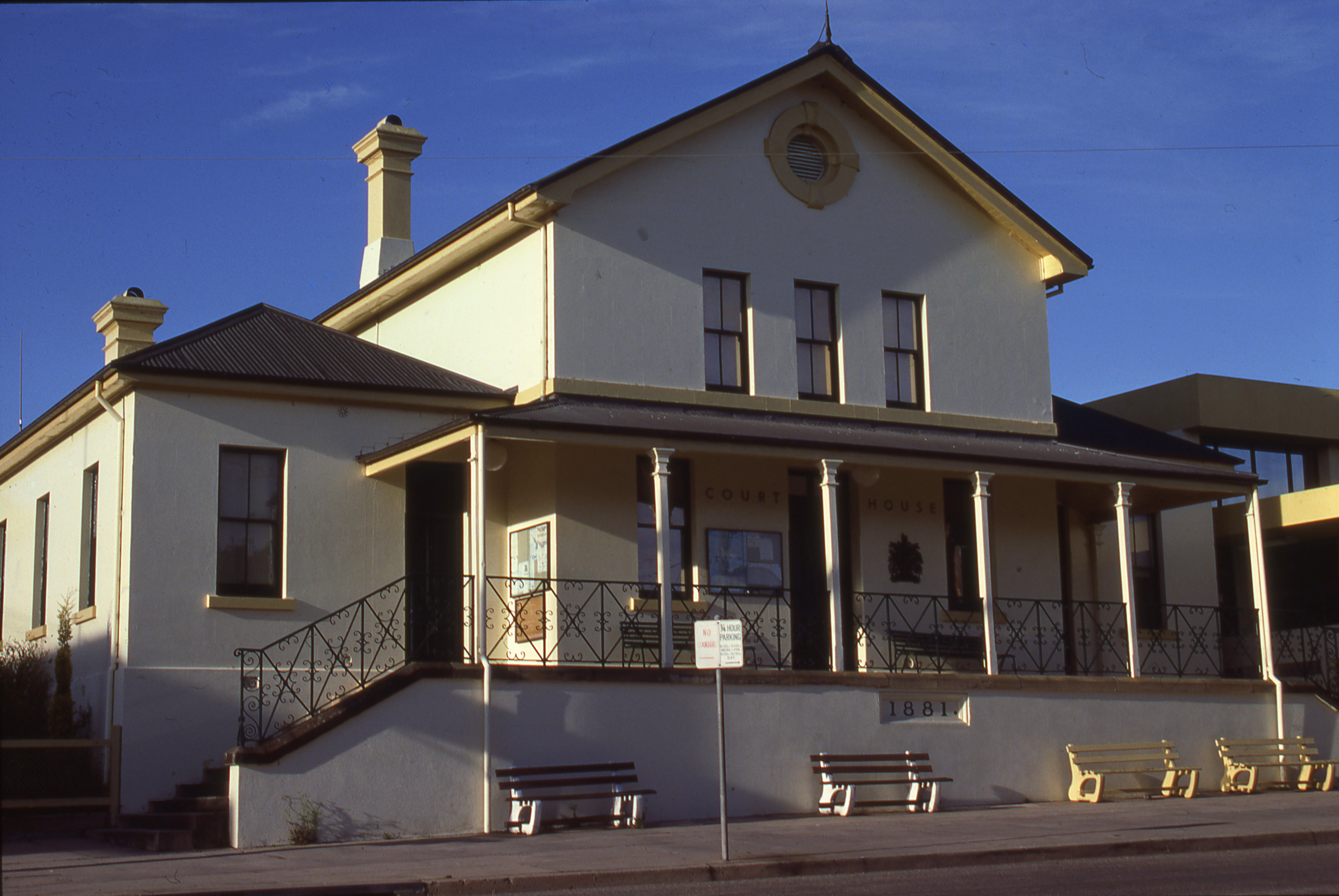
Bega Court House

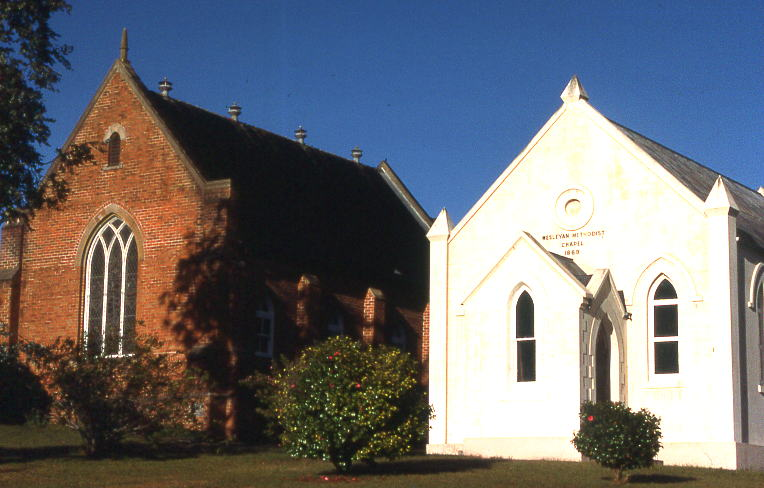
Uniting Church

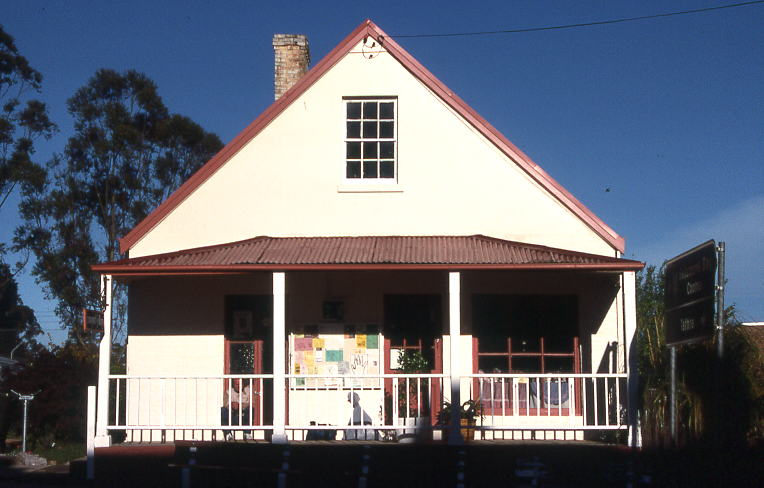
Old Bega Information Centre

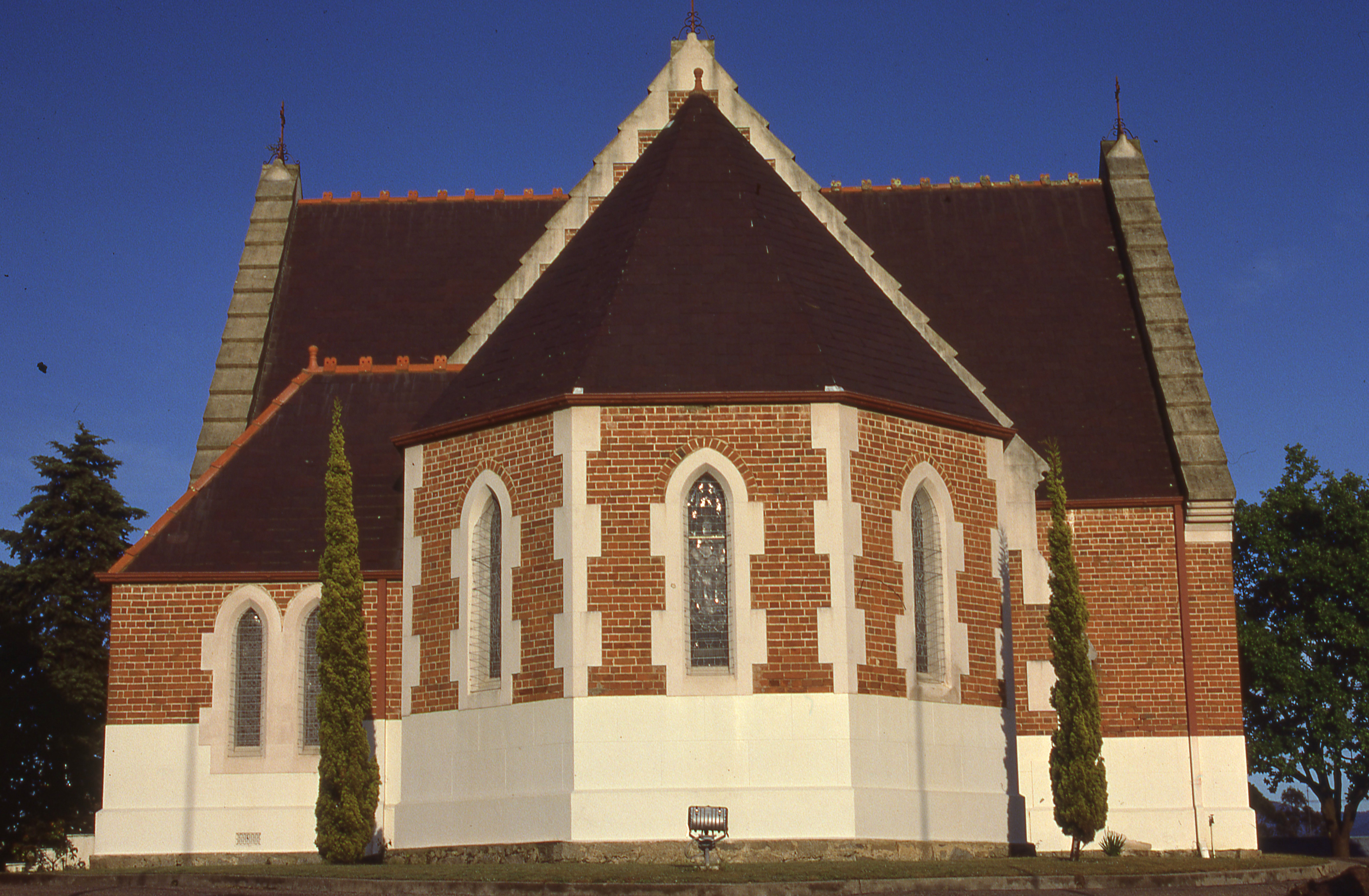
Anglican Church

== Media ==
Radio stations

- Edge FM (FM 93.7 – community)
- East Coast Radio (FM 105.9 – commercial)
- Power FM NSW South Coast (FM 104.3 – commercial)
- Hot Country Radio (87.6FM – commercial – country music format)
- Sky Sports Radio (FM 96.3)
- ABC South East NSW (FM 103.5) – part of the ABC Local Radio network. The station is located on Carp Street in the town.
- Radio National (FM 105.1)
- ABC NewsRadio (FM 100.5)
- ABC Classic (FM 101.9) – also on 95.7 from the adjacent Illawarra region.
- Triple J (FM 98.9 – from the adjacent Illawarra region). A local service from Mount Wandera is planned, subject to the clearance of local television stations.

Television

The Bega Valley Shire receive five free-to-air television stations (television in Australia) including two government funded networks:

The ABC, the SBS and three commercial networks:

- Seven
- Nine and
- Network 10

ABC, SBS, Seven, Nine (WIN) and Network 10 all offer digital high-definition simulcasts of their main channels.

All five networks broadcast additional channels including: 7two, 7mate, 7flix, 7Bravo, 9Go!, 9Gem, 9Life, ABC Family, ABC Entertains, ABC News, SBS2, SBS World Movies, SBS Food, 10 Drama, 10 Comedy and Nickelodeon.

Newspapers

The local newspaper for Bega is the District News (formerly known as The Southern Star).

Daily newspapers such as The Canberra Times, the Illawarra Mercury from Wollongong, the Sydney Morning Herald, the Daily Telegraph, The Australian, The Age, Herald Sun and the Australian Financial Review are available in Bega.

== Notable people ==
- Kezie Apps – Female Rugby League Player
- Chris Atkinson – WRC driver
- David Boyle – Rugby League Player
- Morgan Boyle – Rugby League Player
- Adam Elliott – Rugby League Player
- Dale Finucane – Rugby League Player
- Deborah Glass OBE – Victorian Ombudsman
- Thomas Jack – DJ
- Lenka – singer and songwriter
- Gary Lonesborough – Yuin young adult fiction writer
- Ky Rodwell – Rugby League Player

== See also ==
- Bega schoolgirl murders
