= Power FM 103.1 =

- Ballarat, Victoria, Australia; Australia
- Broadcast area: Australia
- Frequency: 103.1

Programming
- Language: English
- Format: Mainstream CHR (pop, rock, rap), adult contemporary, comedy, talk
- Affiliations: complete list

Ownership
- Owner: ARN; (Radio Ballarat Pty Ltd)
- Sister stations: 3BA

Links
- Website: Power FM 103.1

Power FM (call sign: 3BBA) is a commercial radio station in Ballarat, Victoria, Australia, broadcasting on the FM band at a frequency of 103.1 MHz. It serves listeners in Ballarat, Creswick, Maryborough, Ararat, Meredith, Daylesford, Ballan and surrounding areas. Together with its sister station 3BA, it is owned by ARN. According to a survey in late 2021, Power FM is the most listened-to radio station in Ballarat and holds a 28.1% share of the market.

Currently, the station airs a contemporary hit radio format, featuring music from the 1990s through to today's top 40 hits, aimed at an audience aged under 35. It also airs several syndicated radio programs including Top 40 Pop & Urban Chart Hits.

In June 2009, Power FM and Sovereign Hill attempted to "lure" the singer Pink, who was then on tour in Australia, to Ballarat, whilst also fundraising for the Ballarat Cancer Research Centre. Power FM was also temporarily renamed to "Pink FM." In November 2021, Power FM, along with other stations owned by Grant Broadcasters, was acquired by the Australian Radio Network. This deal will allow Grant's stations, including Power FM, to access ARN's iHeartRadio platform in regional areas. The deal was finalized on 4 January 2022. It is expected Power FM 103.1 will integrate with ARN's KIIS Network, but will retain its current name according to the press release from ARN.

In September 2022, Power FM Brekkie co-host Julie "Jules" Zass resigned after being a host on the station since 2 February 2009, to focus on family life and her new daughter. She was previously a host on Melbourne radio station SYN.

== On-air schedule ==
=== Weekdays ===
- 12:00am–6:00am – Your Hit Music Station
- 6:00am–10:00am – Power FM Brekkie
- 10:00am–2:00pm – Workday Hits
- 2:00pm–6:00pm – The Home Run
- 6:00pm– 8:00pm – Will & Woody

=== Weekends ===
- 12:00am–12:00am – Your Hit Music Station

== See also ==
- List of radio stations in Australia
