= South Coast (New South Wales) =

- Region
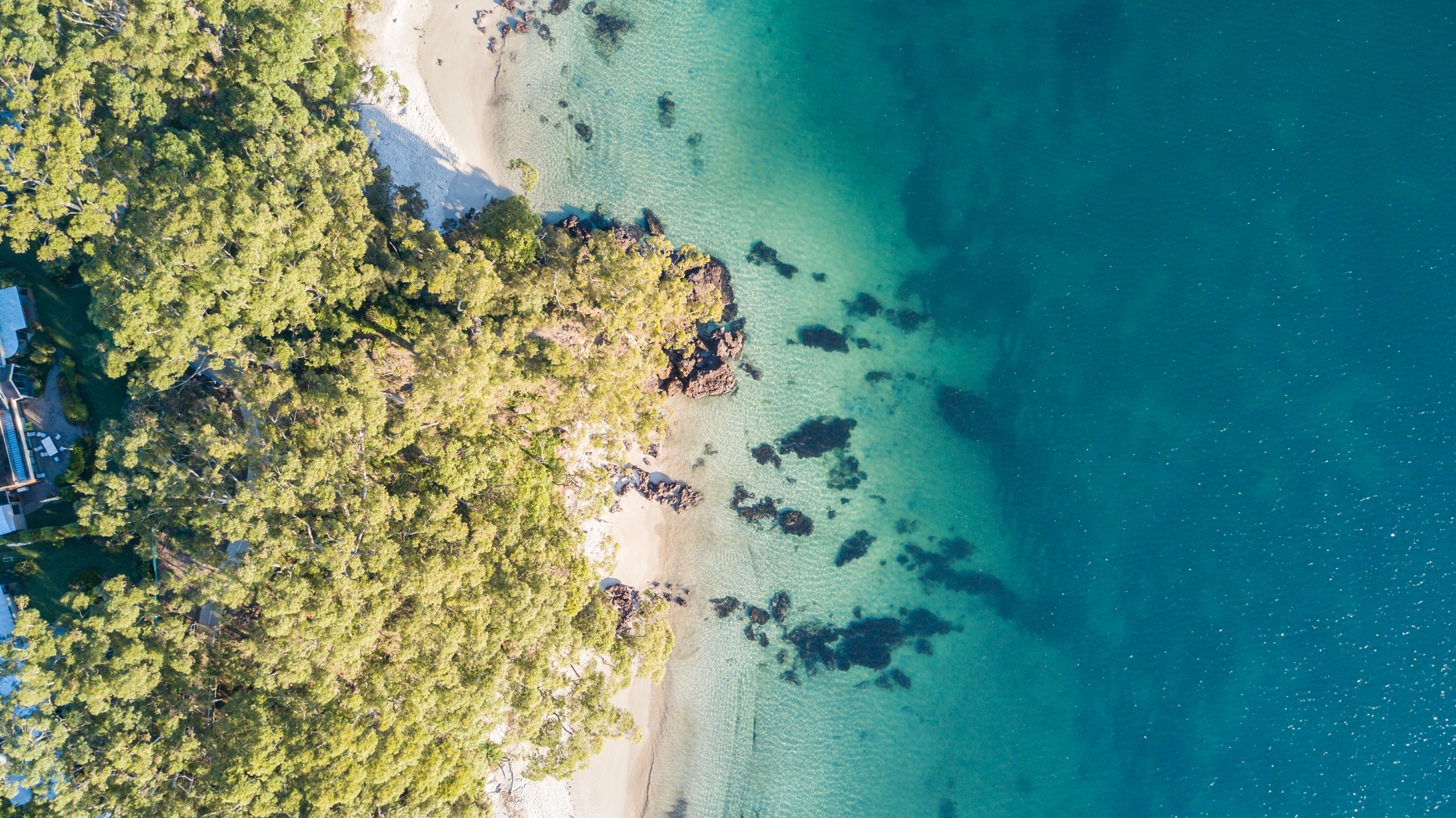
- View of Orion Beach in Vincentia on the shores of Jervis Bay

- Coordinates: 36°00′S 150°06′E
- Country: Australia
- State: New South Wales
- LGA: Bega Valley Shire; Eurobodalla Shire; City of Shoalhaven

Government
  - State electorates: Bega; Kiama; South Coast
  - Federal divisions: Eden-Monaro; Gilmore

Area
  - Total: 14,274 km^{2} (5,511 sq mi)

Population
  - Total: 177,007 (2021)
  - Density: 12.4007/km^{2} (32.1176/sq mi)
- Time zone: UTC+10 (AEST)
  - Summer (DST): UTC+11 (AEDT)
Regions around South Coast
Southern Tablelands	Illawarra	Tasman Sea
Monaro	South Coast	Tasman Sea, Jervis Bay Territory (ACT)
Victorian Alps (VIC)	East Gippsland (VIC)	Tasman Sea

The South Coast refers to the narrow coastal belt from the Shoalhaven district in the north to the state border with Victoria in the south in the south-eastern part of the State of New South Wales, Australia. It is bordered to the west by the coastal escarpment of the Southern Tablelands, and is largely covered by a series of national parks, namely Jervis Bay National Park, Eurobodalla National Park, and Beowa National Park. To the east is the coastline of the Pacific Ocean, which is characterised by rolling farmlands, small towns and villages along a rocky coastline, interspersed by numerous beaches and lakes.

The South Coast includes Shoalhaven district in the north and the Bega Valley in the more remote south as well as the Eurobodalla Shire and the Commonwealth Jervis Bay Territory which is adjacent to the City of Shoalhaven Local Government Area. Some definitions of the region include the Illawarra, but it is often seen as a separate and distinct region of New South Wales.

== Climate ==
The region has a mild, warm temperate climate. Maximum temperatures range from around 30 °C (86 °F) in summer to approximately 17 °C (62 °F) in winter. However, rainfall tends toward erratic as falls can occur in heavy, but often irregular, storms. These storms may occur at any time of year, but are most frequent in late autumn and early winter. When a strong anticyclone is located to the south of these low-pressure systems, rainfalls of up to 350mm (14 inches) in a day and 500 mm (20 inches) in two days may occur. For example, in May 1925 the region received an averages of as much as 860 millimetres (33 inches) of rain, with some places receiving as much as 1,270 mm (50 inches) for the month. However, in dry years the region can receive as little as 400mm (16 inches) for an entire year. Furthermore, Bega received 380 mm (15 inches) in May 1944 and over 400mm (16 inches) in two days during April 1945 – but only around 200 mm (8 inches) in the ten months in between.

A 2011 report by the Climate Commission highlighted the risks of the effects of climate change in the South Coast and Illawarra areas. These risks included a higher likelihood of large fires, coastal flooding, changing rainfall patterns, and more intense storms, all impacting the biodiversity in the region.

Although the region experiences a temperate oceanic climate, Gulaga National Park is the southernmost zone in the state of New South Wales that features a subtropical rainforest.

== Transport ==
The Illawarra Steam Navigation Company serviced the South Coast and Illawarra by ship transporting passengers and goods from the 1850s to the 1950s.

The NSW TrainLink Illawarra railway line services Berry before it terminates at Bomaderry, situated approximately 123 km south of Sydney on the northern side of the Shoalhaven River. Bus services operate to locations south of Nowra.

Merimbula Airport and Moruya Airport are the region's main two airports which provides daily domestic flights to Sydney and Melbourne that are operated by Rex Airlines.

The South Coast region is traversed by the Princes Highway which links Sydney and Melbourne by the coast, but is longer than Hume Highway which is the direct route between the two cities. The region is a reached from Canberra to the west by the Kings Highway.

Road linkages north to Sydney were only completed in the second half of the twentieth century when the Clyde River was bridged at Batemans Bay in 1956. Before that a punt was used to cross the river. The bridge at Narooma had been completed in 1931 and was the first major bridge constructed on the Princes Highway by the Main Roads Board as part of its efforts to develop the Princes Highway which had been opened in 1920.

== Media ==
Radio stations that broadcast to the region are:

- ABC South East NSW covering the whole region (part of ABC Local Radio)
- ABC Illawarra covering northern parts of the region including Nowra and Shoalhaven (part of ABC Local Radio)
- Power FM (commercial)
- East Coast Radio serving Eurobodalla and Bega Valley (commercial)
- 2ST serving Shoalhaven (commercial)
- Edge FM serving Bega (community)

The South Coast region receive five free-to-air television stations (television in Australia) including two government funded networks:

The ABC, the SBS and three commercial networks:

- Seven
- Nine and
- Network 10

ABC, SBS, Seven, Nine (WIN) and Network 10 all offer digital high-definition simulcasts of their main channels.

All five networks broadcast additional channels including: 7two, 7mate, 7flix, 7Bravo, 9Go!, 9Gem, 9Life, ABC Family, ABC Entertains, ABC News, SBS Viceland, SBS World Movies, SBS Food, 10 Drama, 10 Comedy and Nickelodeon.

== Towns ==
Major towns on the South Coast include:

- City of Shoalhaven towns include: Berry, Nowra, Ulladulla, Milton, Mollymook, Lake Conjola, Culburra Beach
- The Eurobodalla Shire towns of Batemans Bay, Moruya and Narooma. It also includes Tilba where the Australian TV series River Cottage Australia was filmed.
- The Bega Valley towns of Bega, Merimbula, Pambula and Eden. It also includes Cobargo home of the annual folk music festival.

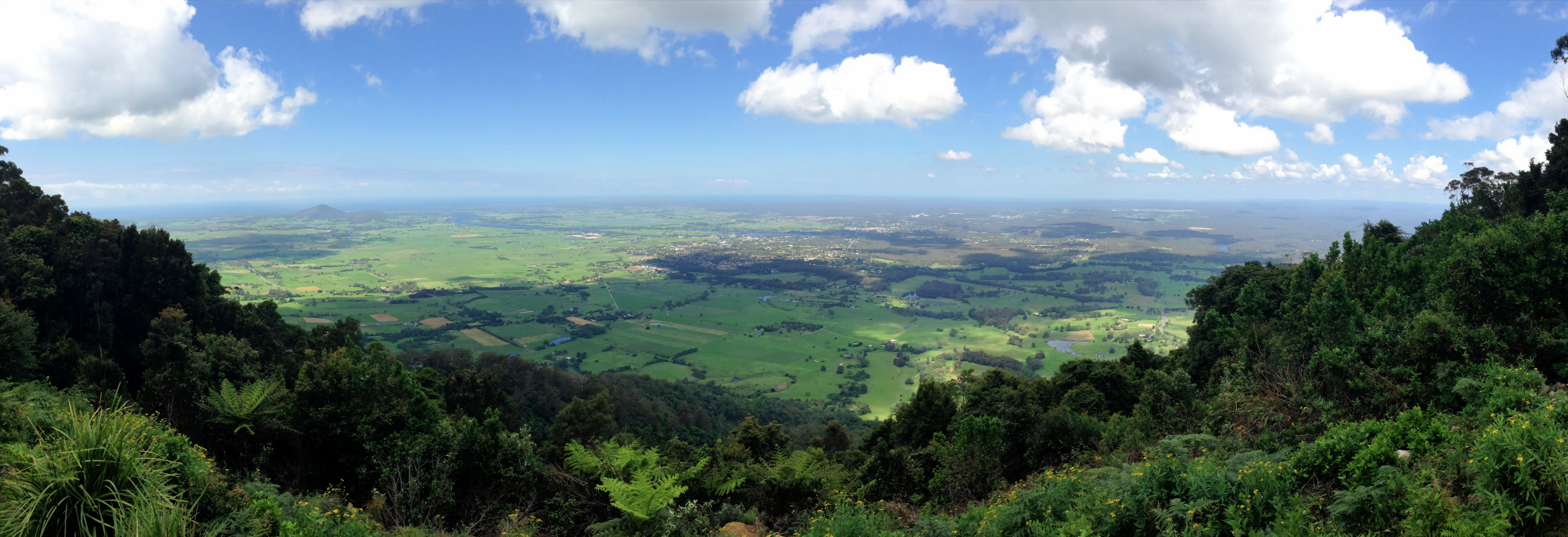
Nowra from Cambewarra lookout

== See also ==
- Regions of New South Wales
