= Triple U FM =

Coordinates: 34.8741°S 150.6009°E

Triple U FM (2UUU)
- Nowra, New South Wales; Australia
- Broadcast area: Shoalhaven area
- Frequencies: 104.5 MHz; 92.3 MHz; 99.7 MHz

Programming
- Affiliations: CBAA

Ownership
- Owner: Shoalhaven Community Radio Inc

History
- First air date: 1990
- Call sign meaning: Triple U

Technical information
- Licensing authority: ACMA

Links
- Public licence information: Profile
- Website: www.tripleu.org.au

Triple U FM is a community radio station based in Nowra, New South Wales, Australia.

== Basic information ==
Triple U FM broadcasts 24 hours a day from the Nowra central business district. It is licensed as a public broadcaster for the Shoalhaven local government area, stretching from Gerroa in the north to Burrill Lake in the south. This area of approximately 4000 square Km is large enough to warrant three transmitters; these are:

- 104.5 FM: transmitting from Cambewarra Mountain. This frequency covers the central part of the listening area such as Nowra, Sanctuary Point, Huskisson and St Georges Basin. Subject to interference in the northern and southern Shoalhaven.
- 92.3 FM: transmitting from Moyean Hill, south east of Berry. Licensed to cover the northern part of the listening area, including Berry, Gerroa, Gerringong, Shoalhaven Heads and parts of the Crookhaven River estuary (Greenwell Point and Culburra).
- 99.7 FM: transmitting from Deering Street, Ulladulla. Licensed to cover the southern part of the listening area, including Milton/Ulladulla/Mollymook, Lake Tabourie and Burrill Lake.

== Programming ==
Programming on Shoalhaven FM is very comprehensive, including local information & interviews, a wide range of music – country, blues, rock and jazz. The station networks programs from the CBAA satellite (such as Living in the 60's, Real World Gardener & Jazz From New York), as well as delayed broadcasts of Shoalhaven council meetings.

== History ==
The station began trial broadcasts in the late 1980s. One of its early organisers was Phil Dye, a primary school teacher and former member of the Moonshiners bush band. After several successful trials, the station was finally granted a license and continues to operate to this present day.
