= Dolphin Point =

- Town
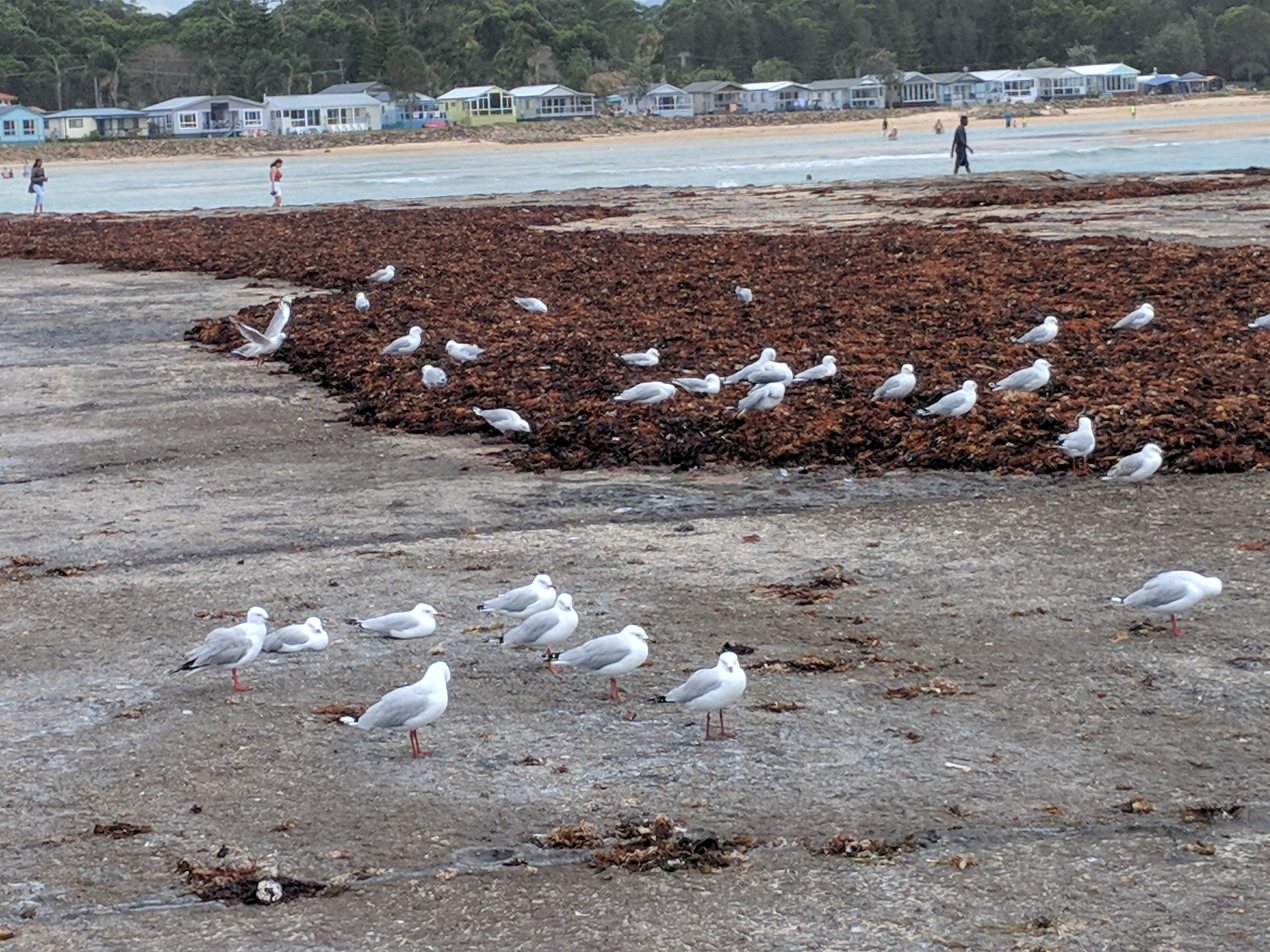

- Coordinates: 35°23′54″S 150°26′43″E
- Country: Australia
- State: New South Wales
- Region: NSW South Coast
- LGA: City of Shoalhaven
- Location: 7 km (4.3 mi) S of Ulladulla

Government
  - State electorate: South Coast
  - Federal division: Gilmore

Population
  - Total: 354 (SAL 2021)
- Postcode: 2539
- County: St Vincent
- Parish: Woodburn
Localities around Dolphin Point
Burrill Lake	Burrill Lake	Burrill Lake
Burrill Lake	Dolphin Point	Tasman Sea
Tabourie Lake	Tasman Sea	Tasman Sea

Dolphin Point is a locality and residential area on the southern fringe of the Milton-Ulladulla conurbation, New South Wales, Australia. It is located about 7 km south of Ulladulla town centre on the southern shore of the Burrill Lake inlet and bounded to the east by the Tasman Sea. It is part of the Shoalhaven local government area. At the 2016 census, it had a population of 204.
