= Mollymook Beach =

- Town
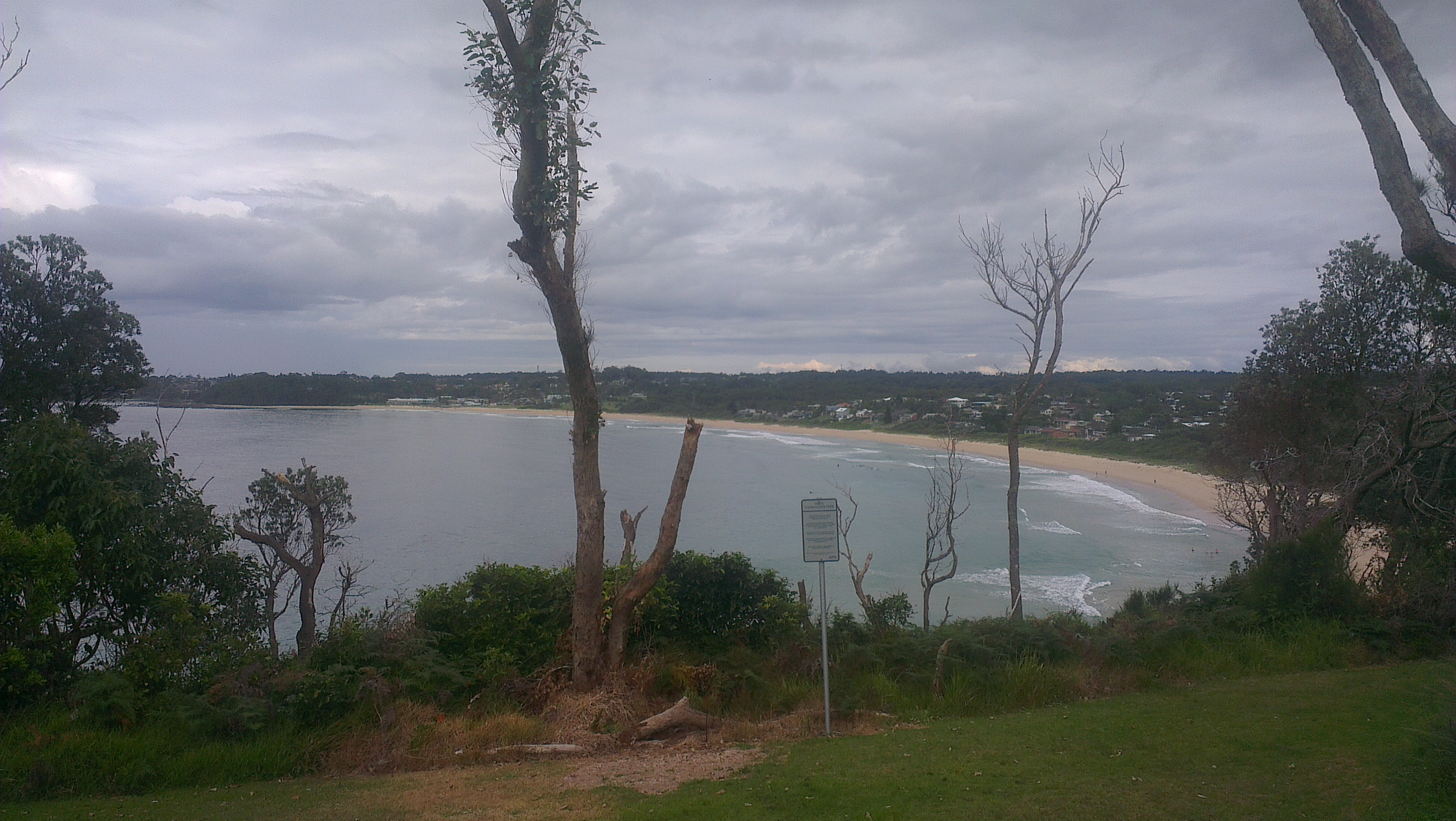
- Looking south over Mollymook beach from Bannister Headland

- Coordinates: 35°19′26″S 150°28′26″E
- Country: Australia
- State: New South Wales
- Region: South Coast
- LGA: City of Shoalhaven
- Location: 5 km (3.1 mi) N of Ulladulla; 61 km (38 mi) S of Nowra; 230 km (140 mi) SSW of Sydney

Government
  - State electorate: South Coast
  - Federal division: Gilmore
- Elevation: 12 m (39 ft)

Population
  - Total: 2,531 (SAL 2021)
- Postcode: 2539
- County: St Vincent
- Parish: Ulladalla
Localities around Mollymook Beach
Milton	Narrawallee	Tasman Sea
Milton	Mollymook Beach	Tasman Sea
Ulladulla	Mollymook	Tasman Sea

Mollymook Beach is a suburb in the City of Shoalhaven, New South Wales, Australia. It is located about four km north of Ulladulla on the northern end of Mollymook beach on the shore of the Tasman Sea. At the 2016 census, it had a population of 2,447. It is a mostly residential area incorporating Bannister Headland and is located north of Mollymook, with the eastern part of the border formed by Blackwater Creek. The southern part of the beach lies in Mollymook.
