= Milton, Australia =

Milton, Australia, may refer to:

- Milton, New South Wales
- Milton, Queensland
