= Alfred Warden =

Australian architect (1868–1955)

Alfred William Warden
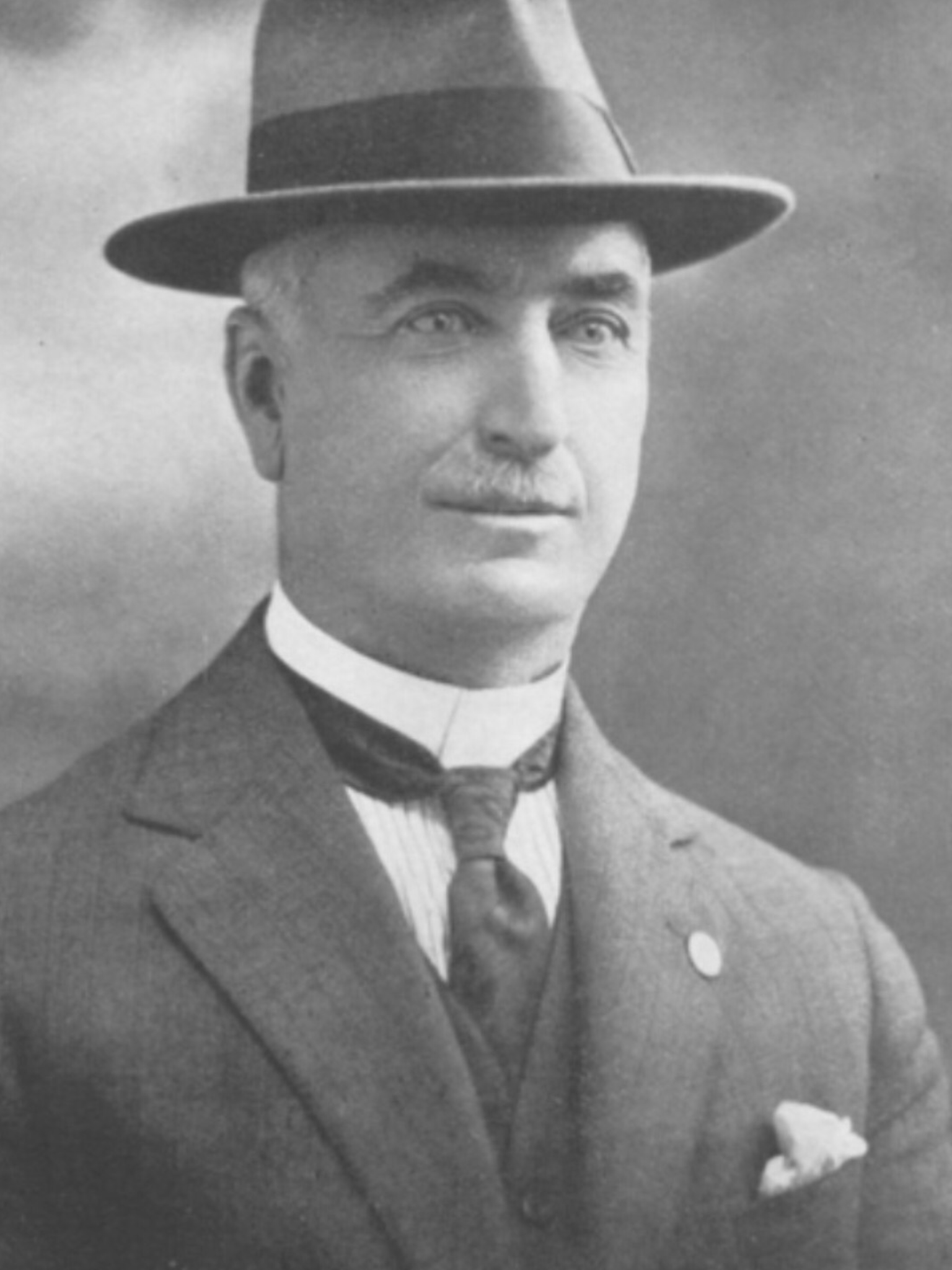
- Born: 26 December 1868; Ulladulla
- Died: 6 September 1955 (aged 86); Sydney
- Military career
- Allegiance: AIF
- Service years: 1894 – 1922
- Rank: Colonel
- Awards: Volunteer Decoration
- Other work: Architect

Colonel Alfred William Warden VD (26 December 1868 – 6 September 1955) was an Australian soldier, military engineer and architect.

== Early life ==
Warden was born at Ulladulla, New South Wales and was educated at Newington College, Sydney, (1884–1887). In his final year of school he was in the first teams in Rugby union, cricket and rifle-shooting. He was one of ten brothers and cousins from the South Coast of New South Wales to attend Newington over two decades. His brother, Winter Warden (1860 – 1936), was a politician and a member of the New South Wales Legislative Council for the Nationalist Party of Australia for 17 years.

== Architectural career ==
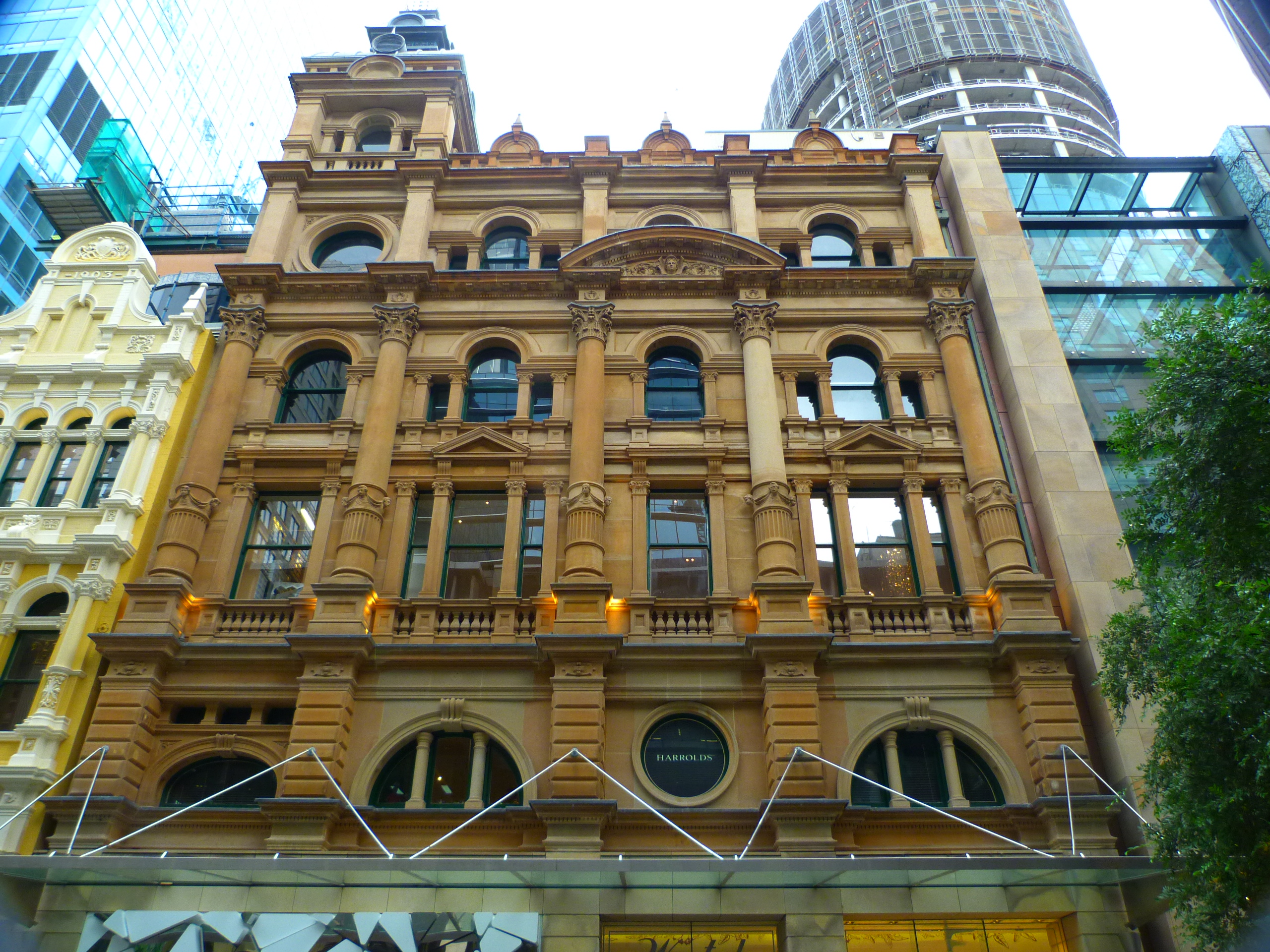
Warden's architectural office was at 164 Pitt Street, Sydney.

On leaving Newington, Warden was articled to the architectural firm of Gustavus Alphonse Morrell & John E Kemp. For the next five years, he studied part-time at Sydney Technical College and attended architecture lectures in the engineering faculty of the University of Sydney. In 1893 he toured the world before commencing practice as an architect in 1895. He took rooms at 164 Pitt Street, Sydney, in a building constructed in Sydney sandstone in the Victorian Italianate style and the restored facade is now incorporated into Westfield Sydney. He later moved his office to 42 Bridge Street, Sydney.

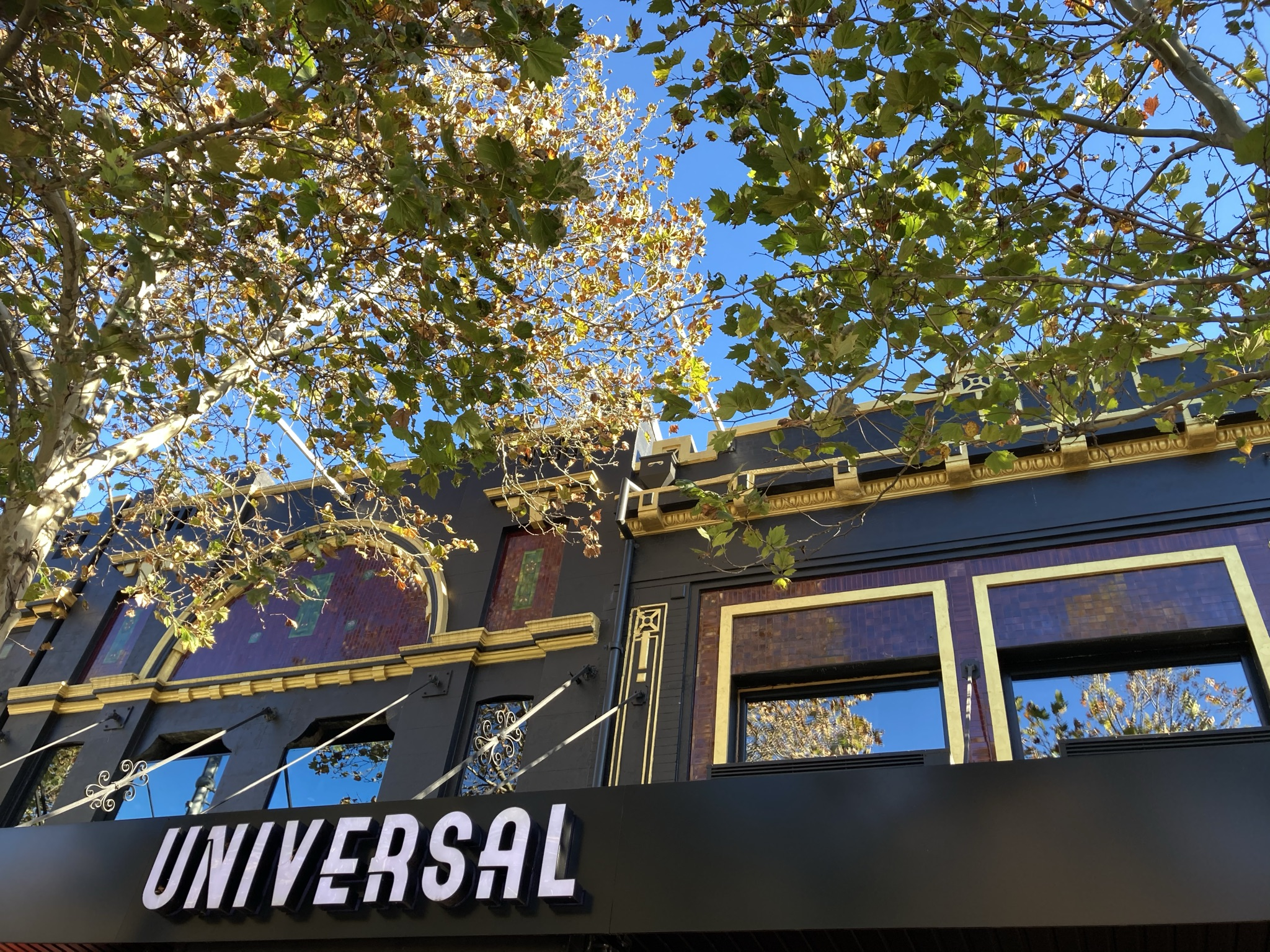
Warden designed the buildings on Oxford Street, Sydney, that now house Universal.

In 1906, Warden designed a cottage residence for Mrs W.F. Middleton at the corner of Perry and Mcauley Streets Albury, which is still extant. The following year Warden designed a homestead at Lower Coolegong, between Young and Grenfell, New South Wales. The homestead, known as Glencara, is still standing and is the centrepiece of an historic family grazing propertyand tourist operation for the district. The commercial buildings that make up 85-91 Oxford Street, Darlinghurst, in inner eastern Sydney and now housing the nightclub Universal, were designed by Warden commencing in 1913. By 1930 Warden is known to have designed residences in the Sydney suburbs of Arnciiffe, Botany, Drummoyne, Killara, North Strathfield, Randwick, Longueville and Waverley. A house in Stanhope Road Killara designed in 1909 by Warden was built by the well known builders Hopkinson & Winn. They constructed houses on the North Shore of Sydney and like Warden were members of the Methodist Church. A house known to have been designed by Warden in 1928 is still extant in Russell Street Russell Lea.

== Military career ==
In 1894, Warden joined the Field Companies NSW Engineers as a second Lieutenant and retired in June 1922 after 28 years service as a colonel. On the outbreak of war in 1914 he was mobilised as Staff-Officer of Engineers and served until the end of 1919.

== Newington College ==
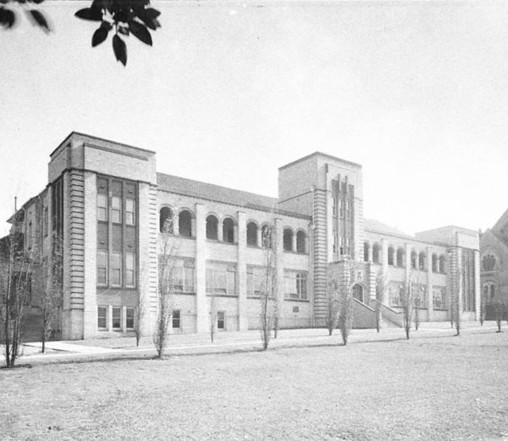
Wyvern House was designed by Warden in 1938 and since 1980 has been known as the Le Couteur Wing. It now houses the Tupou College Centre for Year 7 students.

In 1923, Warden was appointed a member of the Newington College Council and served in that capacity until 1948. During this period of 25 years he was actively involved in the development of the college's buildings and grounds.

In 1925 the Robert Glasson Memorial Boatshed was opened at Abbotsford, New South Wales as the rowing facility of Newington. It was named in honour of Robert E. Glasson who crossed the Blue Mountains with his parents shortly after the discovery of gold in Australia. The family settled in the Molong district, and in 1864 Glasson, then 20 years of age, attended Newington College for one year, later returning to the land as a grazier. The two storied building was of rusticated weatherboard, with a tiled roof. The ground floor had accommodation for the boats, dressing rooms, showers, and baths. Upstairs it had a dining-room, a dormitory sleeping 42, a kitchen and pantry and two rooms for masters or coaches. The balcony across the front of the building had extensive views of the Parramatta River. The entire project cost Newington £3059. The building cost £2529 to erect and the river frontage cost £530. £2000 was donated by the Glasson family whilst the remainder was raised by the Old Newingtonians’ Union. Warden designed the building and Mr. J. Leckie of 12 Castlereagh Street, Sydney was the builder. The Warden designed building was demolished in 1994 and since 2014 the new rowing facility has been known as Robert Glasson Memorial Shed.

In 1929 Warden designed a base for the model of the college, as originally designed by architect Thomas Rowe, when it was presented to the Old Newingtonians’ Union by Colonel Alfred Spain, V.D., and the model and base now stands in the foyer of the Founders Wing at Newington.

In 1933 an Old Newingtonian grazier and author, William Glasson, donated two thousand pounds for the erection of a grandstand between the college ovals. The Glasson Pavilion was designed by Warden in conjunction with another Old Newingtonian architect, Arthur Anderson. It has seating on the southern side for three hundred and fifty-six people and for half that on the northern side. It was planned so that the pavilion, which was in an overblown Federation Bungalow style could be extended to the east, although this didn't eventuate. The building also included dressing rooms, tea-rooms and a ladies' retiring room.

The Stanmore Road boundary of Newington is distinguished by a rusticated stone and wrought iron fence and two sets of entrance gates that were designed by Warden and are now heritage listed. In 1936 the Millner gates were opened after a benefaction by Colonel Thomas Millner MC VD in memory of his father, an Old Boy of Prince Alfred College, Adelaide. In 1938 the second set of gates was opened and named in honour of Frank Edwin Dixon who left £200 to the school in 1929. Dixon's estate also left £500 to the University of Sydney who award an annual chemistry scholarship in his name and £1,000 to the Royal Alexandra Hospital for Children.

During 1937 Philip Le Couteur pushed ahead with the foundation of a new and separate building for Newington's preparatory school students. This building, designed by Warden and known as Wyvern House, was finished in 1938. Inter-War Stripped Classical in appearance, the building had well-lit classrooms for one hundred and fifty boys, and two large dormitories with open-air sleep-outs for fifty boarders. In 1998, Wyvern house moved to a separate campus and the building has been renamed the Le Couteur Wing. At the rear of the Warden designed Le Couter Wing the Tupou College Centre for Year 7 students has been opened recognising Newington's long historic links with Tupou College and the Pacific Kingdom of Tonga. The building was opened in 2016 by King Tupou VI of Tonga.

== Gallery ==
Millner Memorial Fence, Dixon Gates and the Glasson Pavilion

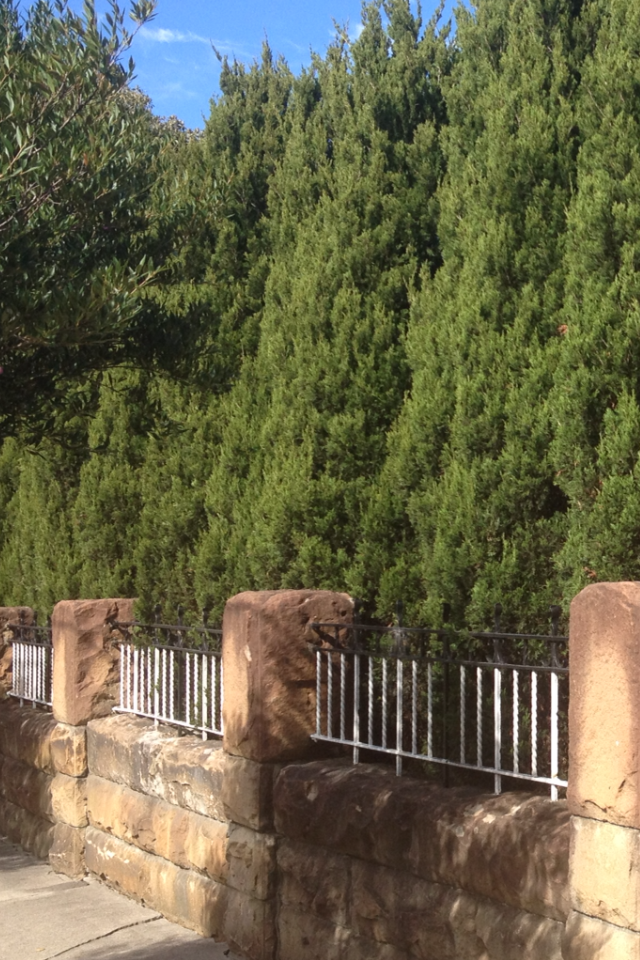

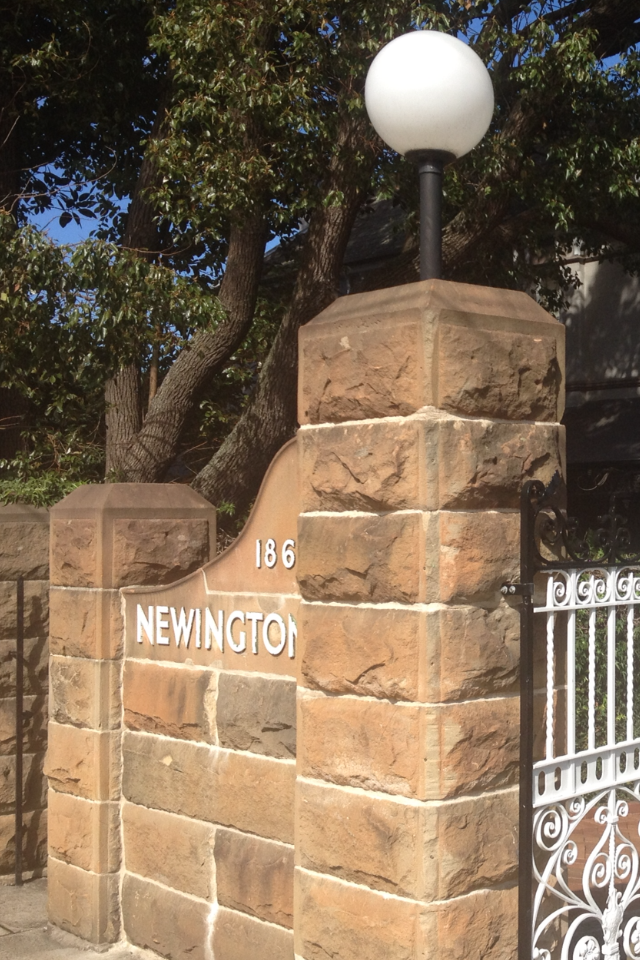

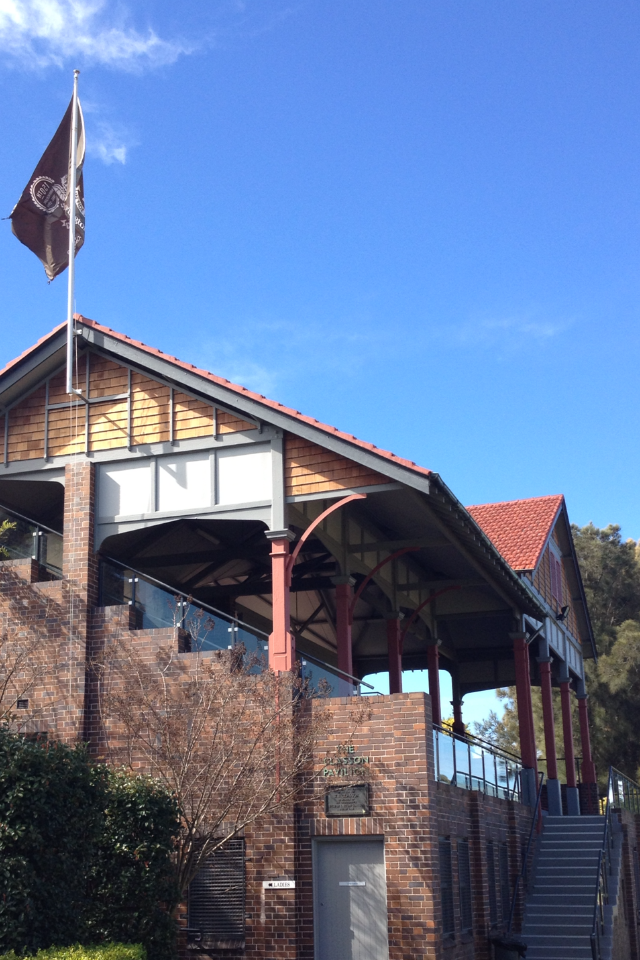

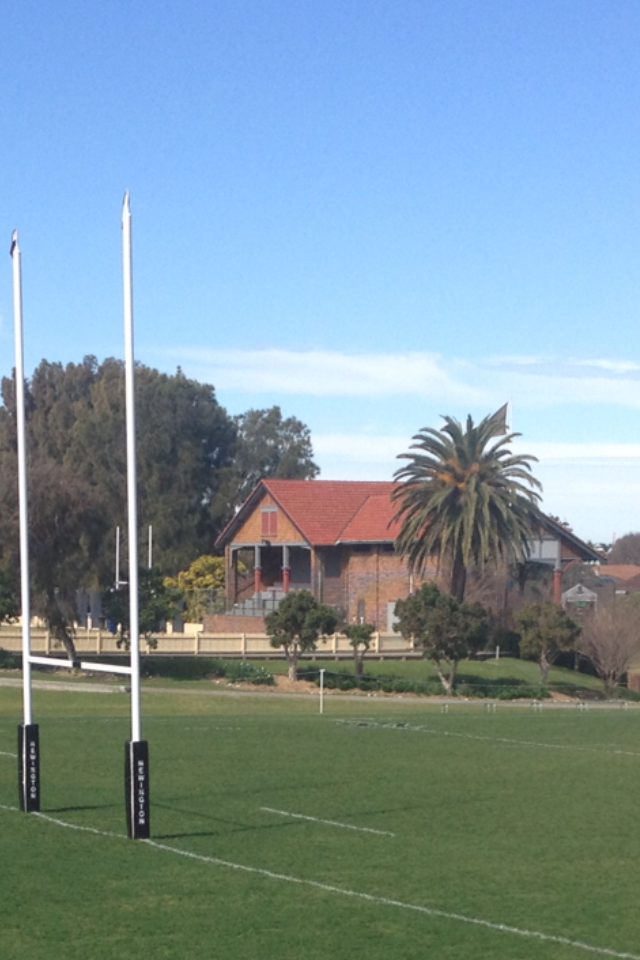
