= Winter Warden =

Australian politician (1860–1936)

The Honourable Winter Warden MLC

Member of New South Wales Legislative Council
- In office 17 July 1917 – 22 April 1934

Personal details
- Born: 26 November 1860 Ulladulla, New South Wales
- Died: 3 June 1936 (aged 75) Milton, New South Wales
- Party: Nationalist
- Spouse: Margaret Wallace (née Kendall)
- Relations: Uncle; James Warden MLA; Brother; Colonel Alfred Warden VD
- Children: 3 daughters and 3 sons
- Education: Newington College
- Occupation: Dairy Farmer

Winter David Warden (26 November 1860 – 3 June 1936) was an Australian politician and a member of the New South Wales Legislative Council for the Nationalist Party of Australia for 17 years.

== Early life ==
Warden was born in Ulladulla, New South Wales, the son of David Warden, land and ship building yard owner, and Grace Buchan. His uncle, James Warden, was a Member of the Legislative Assembly. He was one of seven brothers and attended Newington College commencing in 1875 whilst the school was situated at Newington House on the Parramatta River. His younger brother, Colonel Alfred Warden VD (1868 – 1955), was a soldier, military engineer and architect.

== Career ==
After school he became a dairy farmer at Milton, New South Wales. He was chairman of Coastal Farmers' Co-operative Society Limited, a member of the Producers' Distributing Society Limited, a director of Co-operative Insurance Company of Australia Limited, a committee member of Royal Agricultural Society of New South Wales and a member of the Milton Agricultural and Horticultural Association.
