= Kings Point, New South Wales =

Kings Point
- Town
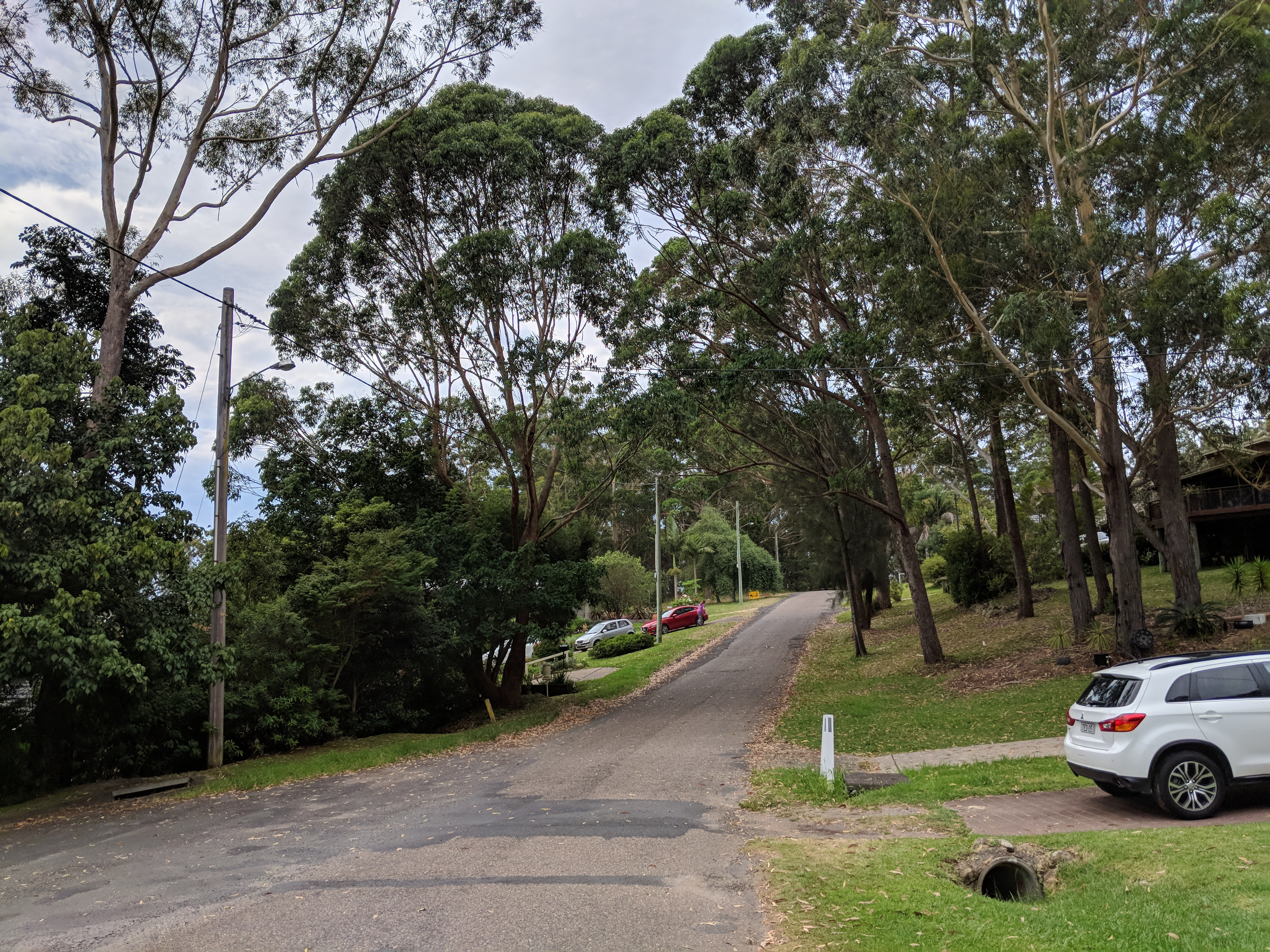

- Coordinates: 35°22′15″S 150°26′19″E
- Country: Australia
- State: New South Wales
- Region: South Coast
- LGA: City of Shoalhaven
- Location: 4 km (2.5 mi) SW of Ulladulla

Government
  - State electorate: South Coast
  - Federal division: Gilmore

Population
  - Total: 553 (2016 census)
- Postcode: 2539
- County: St Vincent
- Parish: Ulladulla
Localities around Kings Point
| Woodstock | Ulladulla | Ulladulla |
| Woodstock | Kings Point | Ulladulla |
| Woodburn | Burrill Lake | Burrill Lake |

Kings Point is a village in the South Coast region of New South Wales, Australia. The village forms part of the Milton Ulladulla urban area in the southern Shoalhaven. Kings Point is predominantly a residential suburb on the shores of Burrill Lake. A small light industrial area to the east separates the village from Ulladulla. At the 2016 census, Kings Point had a population of 553. The lakeside location makes Kings Point popular for fishing and water sports - the Ulladulla Water Ski Club and public boat ramp facilities allow locals and visitors to take full advantage.

Kings Point is served six days per week by Ulladulla Bus Lines Route 740, connecting to the neighbouring towns of Ulladulla and Burrill Lake.
