= Narrawallee =

- Town
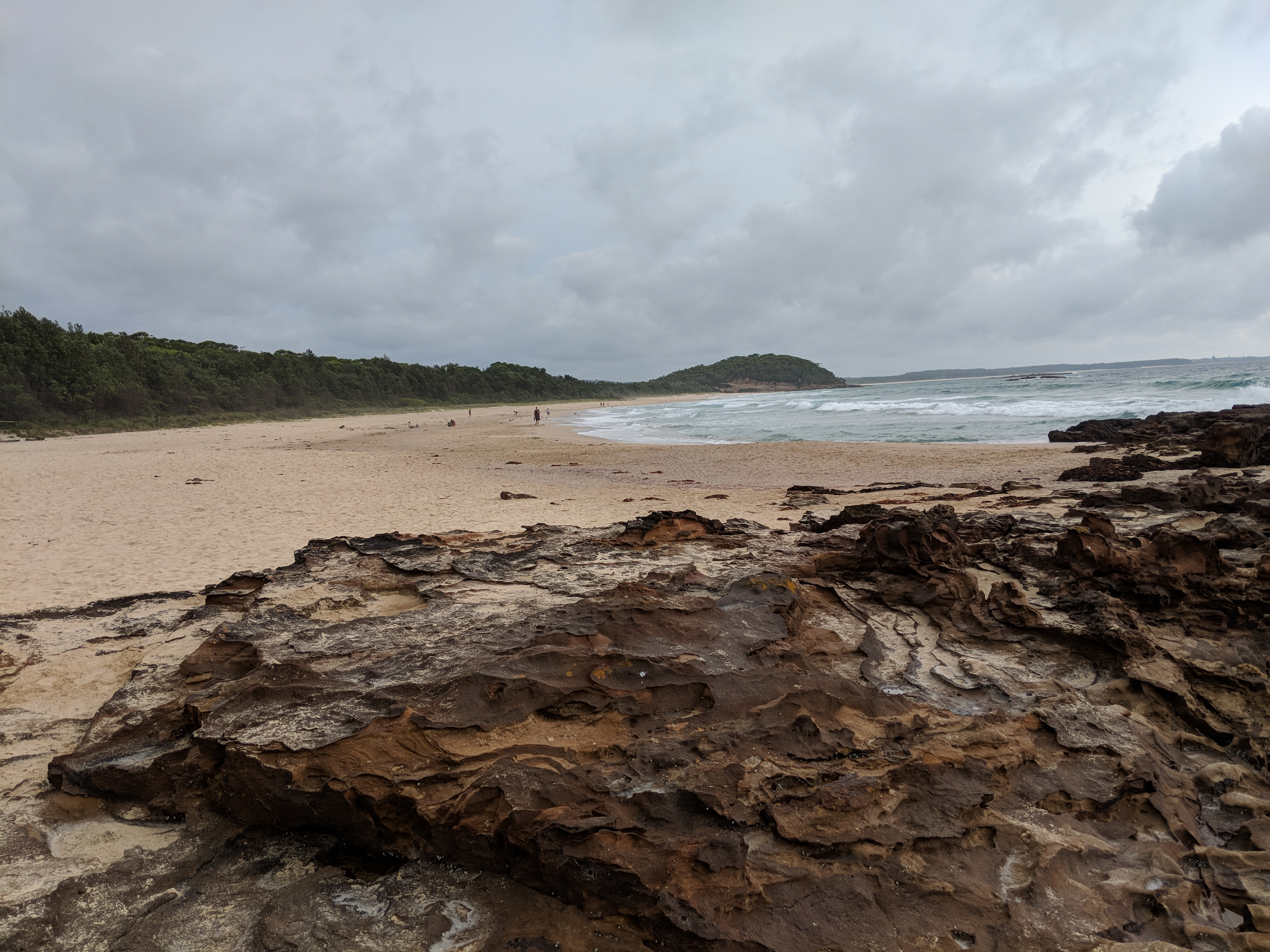
- Narrawallee beach

- Coordinates: 35°18′S 150°28′E
- Country: Australia
- State: New South Wales
- Region: South Coast
- LGA: City of Shoalhaven
- Location: 224 km (139 mi) SSW of Sydney; 5 km (3.1 mi) N of Ulladulla; 64 km (40 mi) S of Nowra

Government
  - State electorate: South Coast
  - Federal division: Gilmore
- Elevation: 22 m (72 ft)

Population
  - Total: 1,241 (2016 census)
- Postcode: 2539
- County: St Vincent
- Parish: Conjola
Localities around Narrawallee
Milton	Lake Conjola
Milton	Narrawallee	Tasman Sea
Milton	Mollymook Beach	Mollymook Beach

Narrawallee (/nærəwɒliː/ NARRA-wol-lee) is a coastal village in the South Coast region of New South Wales, Australia. At the 2016 census, it had a population of 1,241. The village, along with its southern neighbours Mollymook and Mollymook Beach are generally considered part of the Milton-Ulladulla district within the City of Shoalhaven local government area. Narrawallee is predominantly a residential suburb, bordered by a tidal inlet to the north and Matron Porter Drive. The name "Narrawallee" is taken from the creek which flows eastwards from Milton and its estuary on the Tasman Sea and is itself a corruption of the Aboriginal words Nurrawerree or Narra Warra.

== History ==
The first inhabitants and traditional landowners of the area were the Budawang tribe of the Yuin nation. European activity in Narrawallee began in 1924 when a 610 mm (24 in) gauge tramway was constructed to transport silica from deposits near Conjola to a jetty at Bannister Head. This involved the construction of a bridge across the mouth of Narrawallee inlet using local timbers at a cost of £2600. Silica transported on the tramway was crushed at a facility at Bannister Head, then shipped to steelworks at Newcastle and Port Kembla. The tramline survived until due to a downturn in production during World War II the rails were lifted in 1943 and the bridge dismantled the following year. Remnants of the bridge supports are still visible on the northern side of Narrawallee inlet.

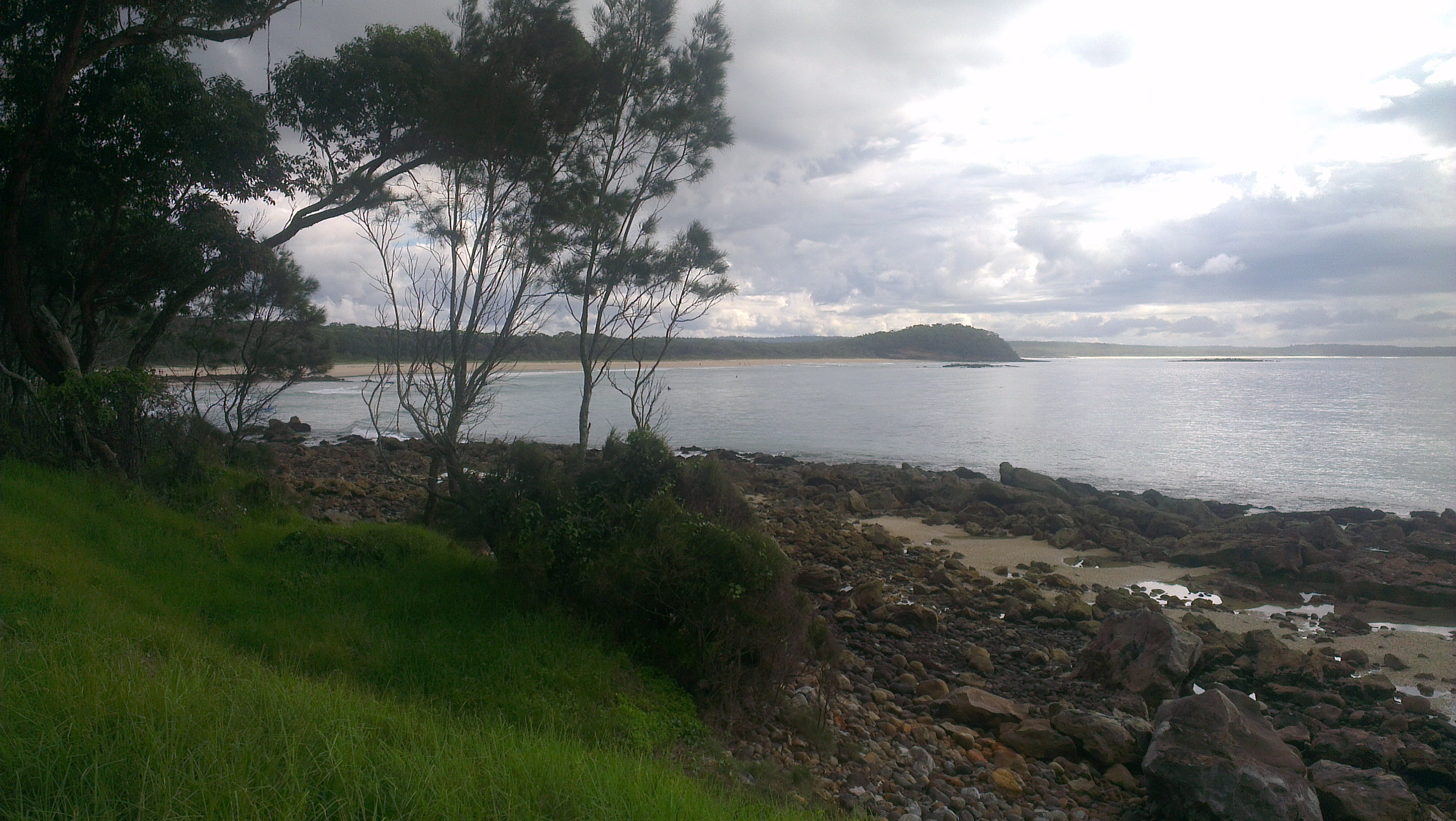
Narrawallee beach viewed from Bannister Headland

== Present day ==
Popular due to its coastal setting, development in the modern village of Narrawallee began in the 1960s and 70s and is made up of a mix of permanent residences, holiday rentals and weekenders. Residential development is set back from Narrawallee Beach, providing a public foreshore reserve. During summer holiday periods, lifeguards from the Mollymook Surf Lifesaving Club patrol the southern end of the beach. A boat ramp at Narrawallee Inlet allows small vessels to be launched depending on tides and public restrooms, picnic and barbecue areas are also provided. The reserve provides opportunities for activities such as bush walking and fishing, as well as recreational water sports and is popular with families as the estuary is protected from the rough surf.

The village is served six days a week by local bus services to both Milton and Ulladulla by Ulladulla Bus Lines route 740. The Milton-Ulladulla Baptist Church is located in Narrawallee.
