= Mollymook =

- Town
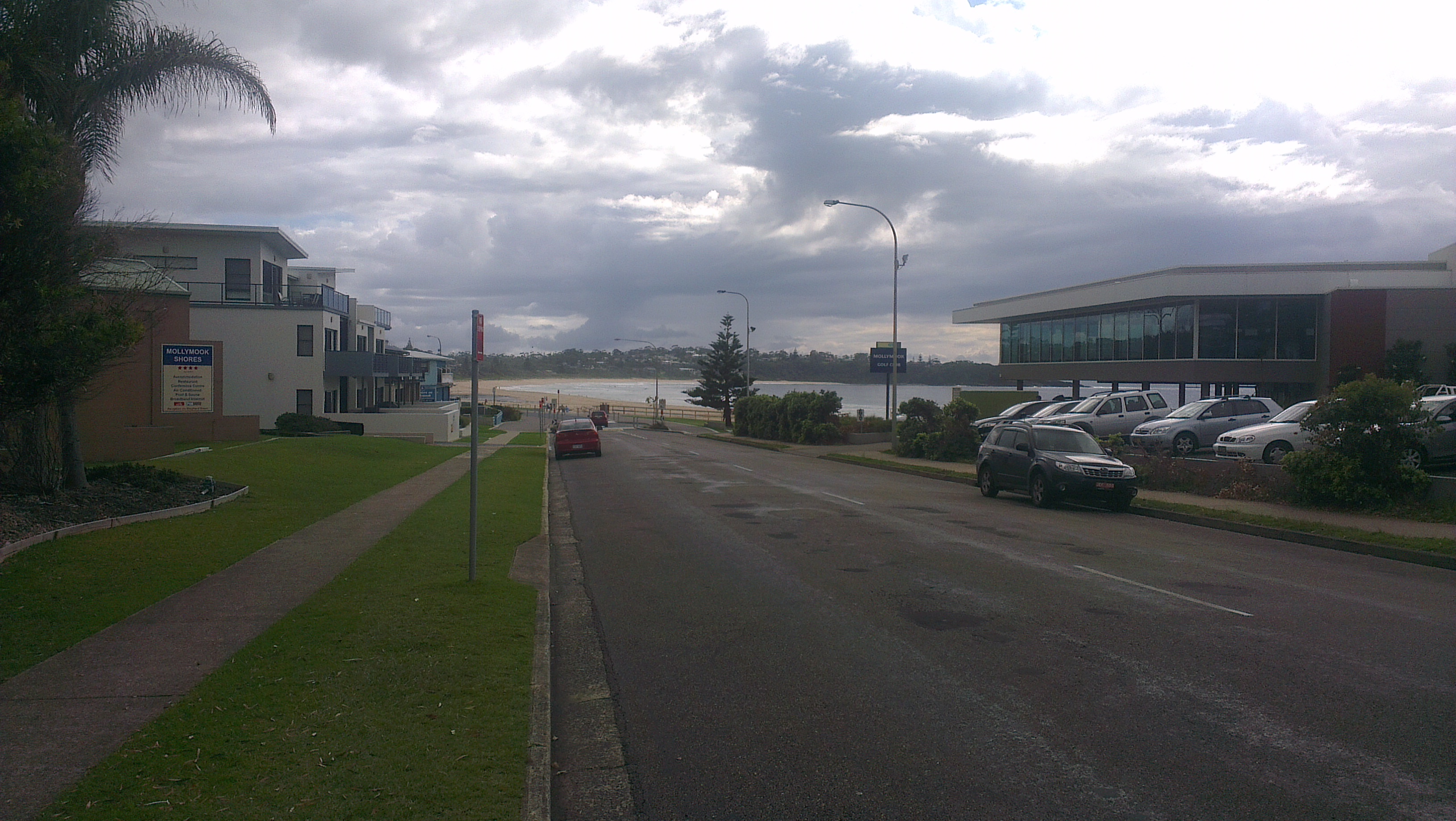
- View of Mollymook Beach from Golf Avenue

- Coordinates: 35°19′47″S 150°28′31″E
- Country: Australia
- State: New South Wales
- Region: South Coast
- LGA: City of Shoalhaven
- Location: 2.5 km (1.6 mi) N of Ulladulla; 64 km (40 mi) SSW of Nowra; 225 km (140 mi) SSW of Sydney

Government
  - State electorate: South Coast
  - Federal division: Gilmore
- Elevation: 19 m (62 ft)

Population
  - Total: 1,195 (SAL 2021)
- Postcode: 2539
- County: St Vincent
- Parish: Ulladalla
- Annual rainfall: 1,430 mm (56 in)
Localities around Mollymook
Milton	Mollymook Beach
Ulladulla	Mollymook	Tasman Sea
Ulladulla	Ulladulla

Mollymook is a town located on the South Coast of New South Wales, Australia approximately three hours' drive south of Sydney within the City of Shoalhaven local government area. At the 2016 census, Mollymook had a population of 1,083 while the adjacent locality of Mollymook Beach was home to a further 2,447 people. Geographically, Mollymook is considered part of the Milton-Ulladulla district, a coastal corridor of urban development stretching from Burrill Lake, south of Ulladulla to Mollymook's northern neighbour, Narrawallee and the historic town of Milton a few kilometres inland.

Mollymook is an area that consists of two different localities. The first one is called Mollymook Beach, which is mostly residential and includes Bannister Headland adjacent to Narrawallee. The second one is simply called Mollymook, and it comprises the Mollymook golf and surf lifesaving clubs, as well as motels and serviced apartments.

The name "Mollymook" is believed to be derived from mollymawk. It is the name given by sailors to small species of albatross.

== History ==
Mollymook was first settled as a rural area of Ulladulla. In 1859, the Mitchell family established a property named "Molly Moke" in the vicinity of Garside Road. "Mollymook" is possibly a reference to the black-browed mollymawk. A cemetery overlooking the sea was in use by 1893. Sometime around 1900, John Coller allowed public access to the beach and rock pools on his family estate (present-day Coller's Beach), and Mollymook began to earn a reputation as a popular retreat. Silica mining operations were commenced on Mollymook's southern headland by the Illawarra Brick Company prior to 1920 and brought an influx of workers to the quarries. Bannister Headland at the northern end of Mollymook Beach was the site of a silica crushing facility and loading jetty in the early 20th century. In 1924, a tramway was constructed across Narrawallee Inlet to transport silica from mining leases near Conjola for preparation and shipping. The industry declined during World War II. During the 1990s, many of Mollymook's older homes began to be redeveloped with medium-density apartments and resort style hotels. Like much of the south coast, the town is popular with retirees.

== Facilities and infrastructure ==
Mollymook has an economy largely based on tourism relying on nearby Ulladulla with a larger population base for many services and employment opportunities. A small shopping centre with a supermarket, pharmacy, and several specialty shops is located at the northern end of Mollymook, as well as a public sports ground – the Bill Andriski Mollymook Oval, medical centre, and bowling club. A range of beachside accommodation options are popular during the summer holiday seasons including motels, holiday rental homes, serviced apartments, as well as the upmarket Bannister Head Lodge. In peak holiday times South Mollymook Beach, North Mollymook Beach, and Narrawallee are all patrolled by members of the Mollymook Surf Lifesaving Club. The Sandridge Memorial Gardens Cemetery has been in use since 1893 and is the largest in the district, located at the corner of Ocean Street and Mitchell Parade, overlooking Mollymook Beach.

Ulladulla Bus Lines route 740 provides public transport services six days per week toward Ulladulla and Milton, with several stops in Mollymook up to five times per day.

== Sport and recreation ==
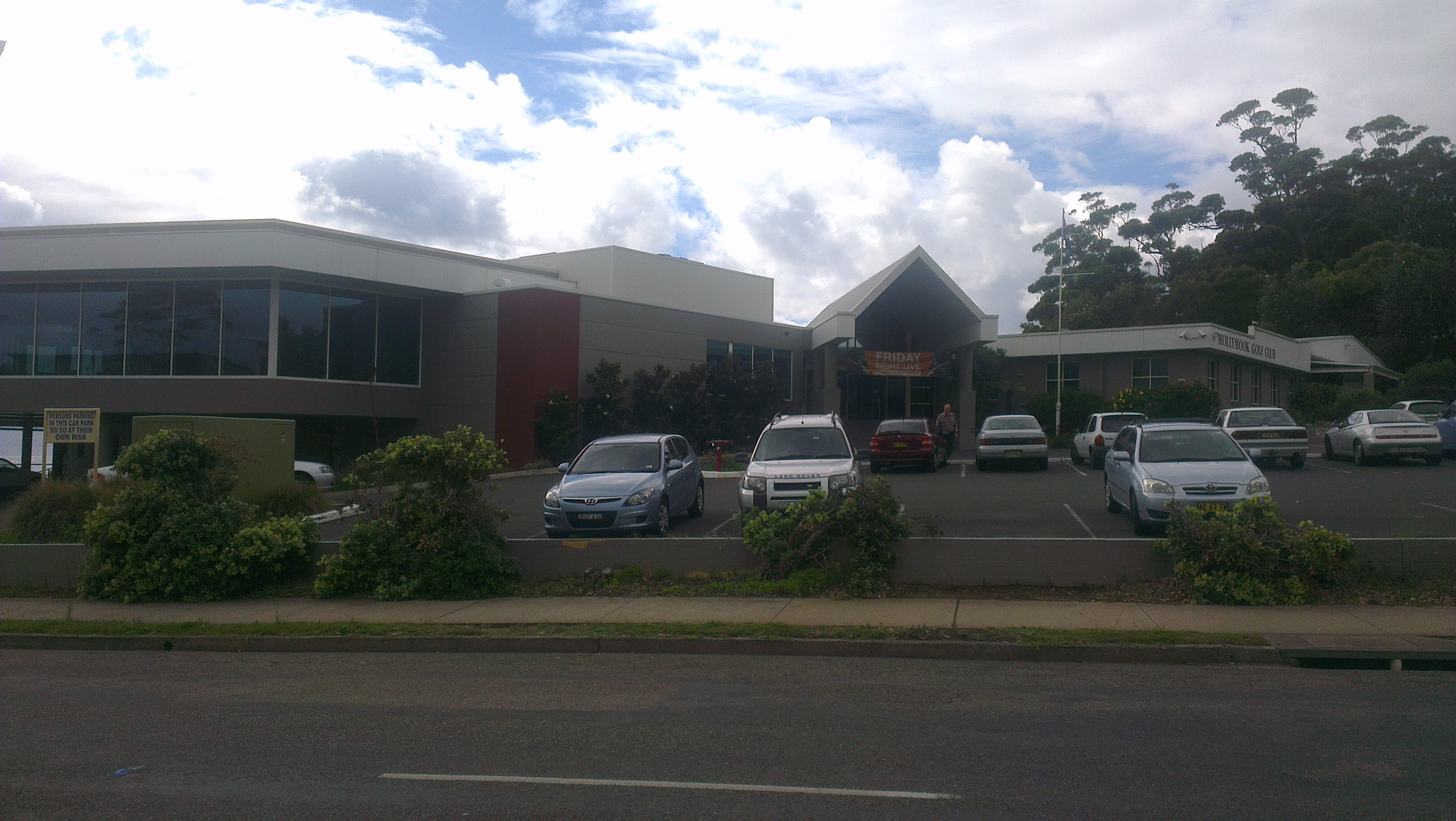
Mollymook Golf Club, located on the southern end of Mollymook Beach

The Mollymook Golf Club maintains two golf courses; the Hilltop course is an 18-hole Championship course, renowned for a challenging and picturesque layout. Designed in 1977, the March 2006 edition of Australian Golf Digest rated this course as number 97 in the top 100 Australian golf courses. The smaller 9-hole, Par 33 Beachside course is aimed mainly at social golfers. The Hilltop course features a lounge bar, pro-shop and locker room, offering cart hire, conference, and practice facilities. The main clubhouse is located next to Mollymook Beach, adjacent to the Beachside course and offers gaming and dining options and a large function room with panoramic views of the beach.

The smaller Mollymook Beach Bowling Club also offers bistro style dining and a range of recreational activities including lawn bowls and poker tournaments. The Mollymook Surf Lifesaving Club hosts many competitions and surf carnivals throughout the year. Events include surf boat races and ocean swims. The club encourages the participation of "Nippers", junior club members aged between 5 and 14 who learn skills in water safety and surf lifesaving many of whom go on to patrol the local beaches. The club also maintains a kiosk and function rooms at their clubhouse at the southern end of the beach.

The Bill Andriski Oval is the home ground of the Milton-Ulladulla Bulldogs, a rugby league team which competes in the Group 7 competition of the Country Rugby League. In July 2004, the Nine Network broadcast an episode of The Footy Show live from the oval, including several pre-recorded segments featuring Mollymook Beach and the Surf Lifesaving Club.

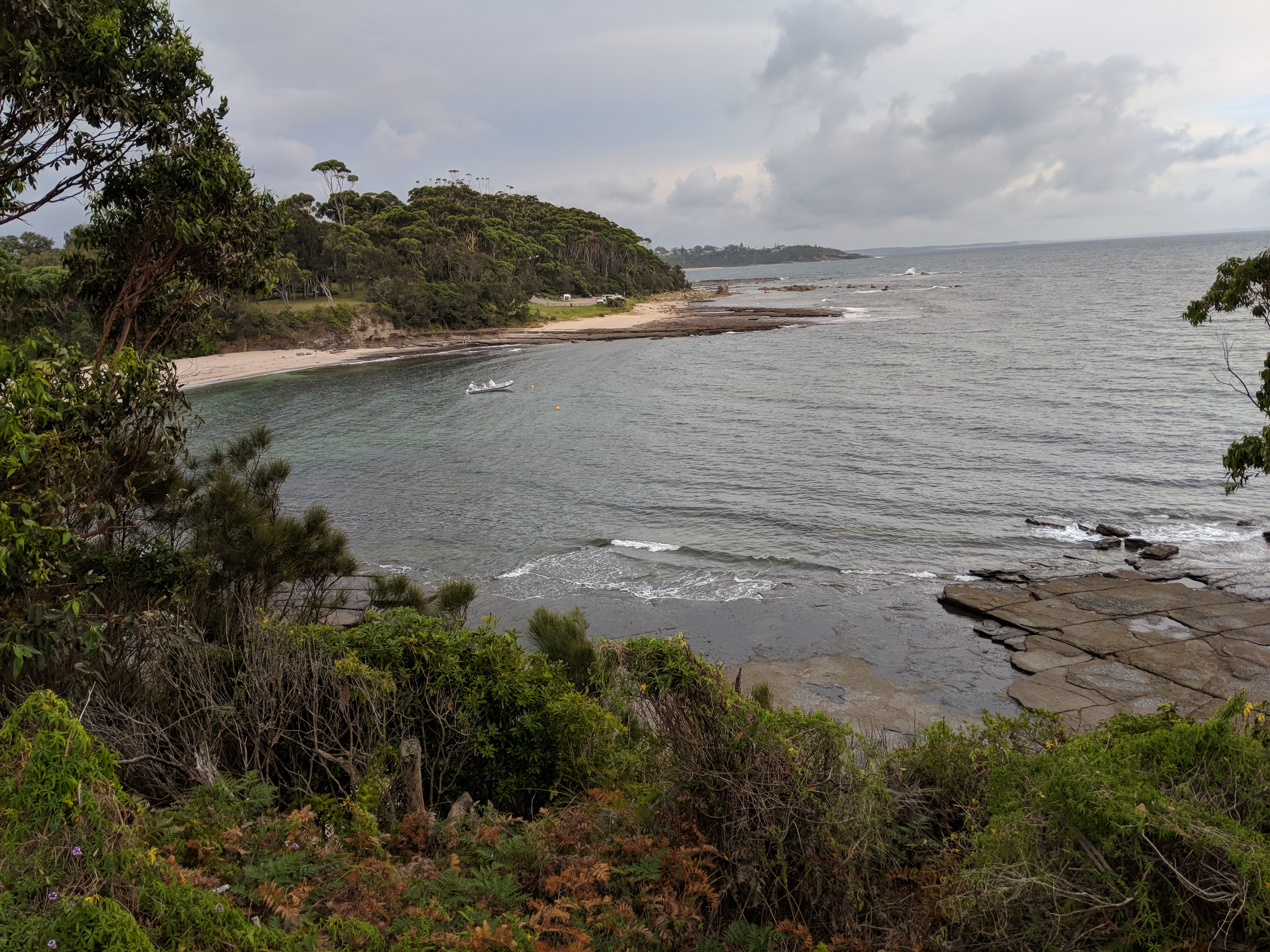
Colliers Beach

Surfing is a common sport in the area and Mollymook contains numerous popular breaks, including Colliers, Golfies, Kamakazes, and more along Mollymook beach. Diving and spear fishing is also popular around the rocks, and Bannister Head to the north of Mollymook beach contains the well known jumprock and run-and-jump.

== Tourism and attractions ==
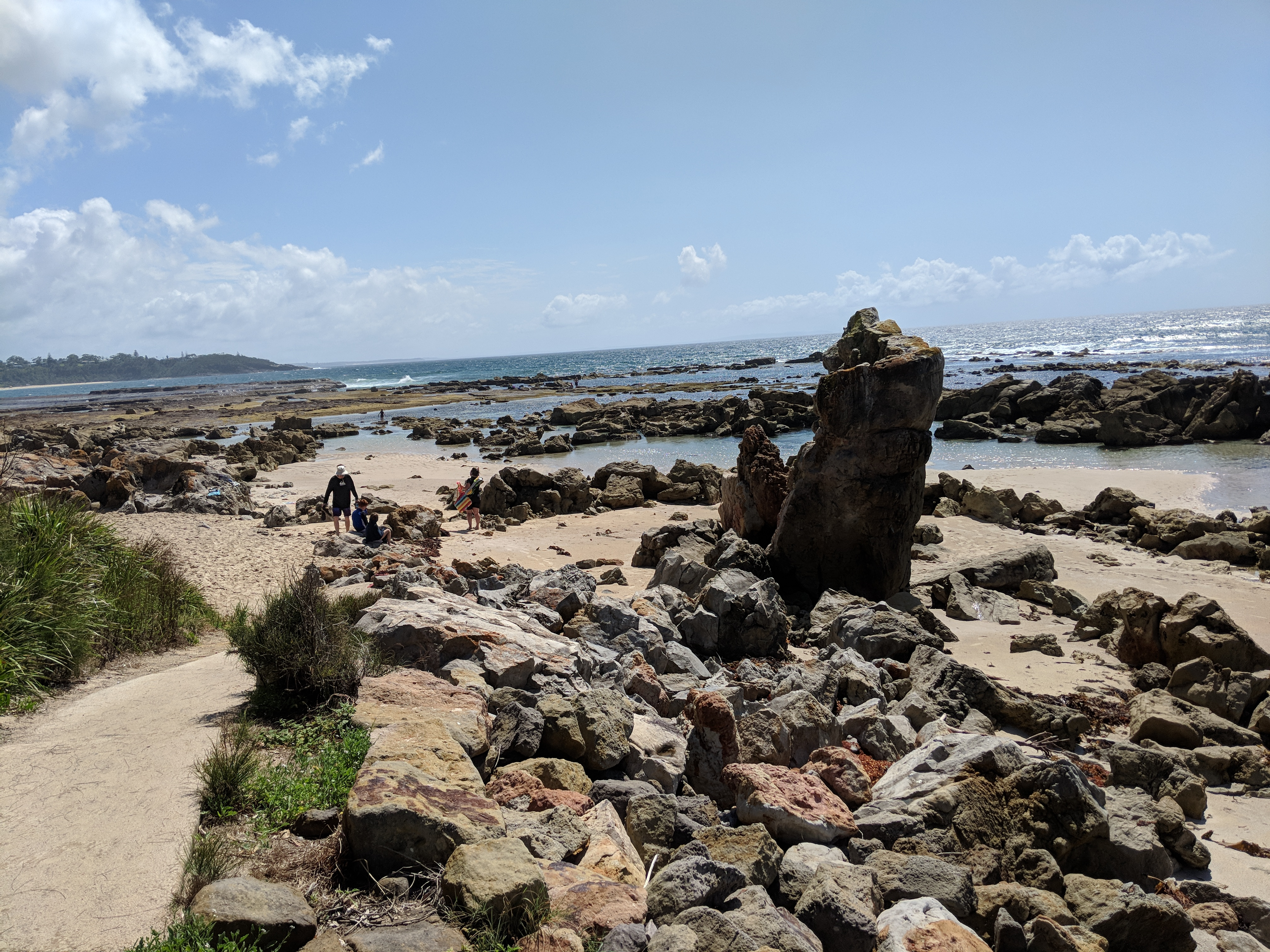
Bogey Hole

In addition to the surf beach, Mollymook also boasts a large natural rock pool known as the "Bogey Hole". This sheltered pool is protected from the sea, making it popular with families due to the calm waters. Nearby Collers Beach offers opportunities for snorkelling and has been designated by the Shoalhaven City Council as an off-leash area where dog owners can allow their pets to exercise freely. Additional amenities are provided at the northern end of Mollymook Beach which is popular with surfers due to it being more exposed to the open sea.

In October 2009, English celebrity chef and restaurateur Rick Stein opened his first Australian restaurant in Mollymook – 'Rick Stein at Bannisters'. Located at 'Bannisters' a Boutique Hotel on the cliff tops of Bannisters Point, the opening of 'Rick Stein at Bannisters' increased media attention and public awareness of the town of Mollymook.
