= Milton, New South Wales =

Milton
- Town
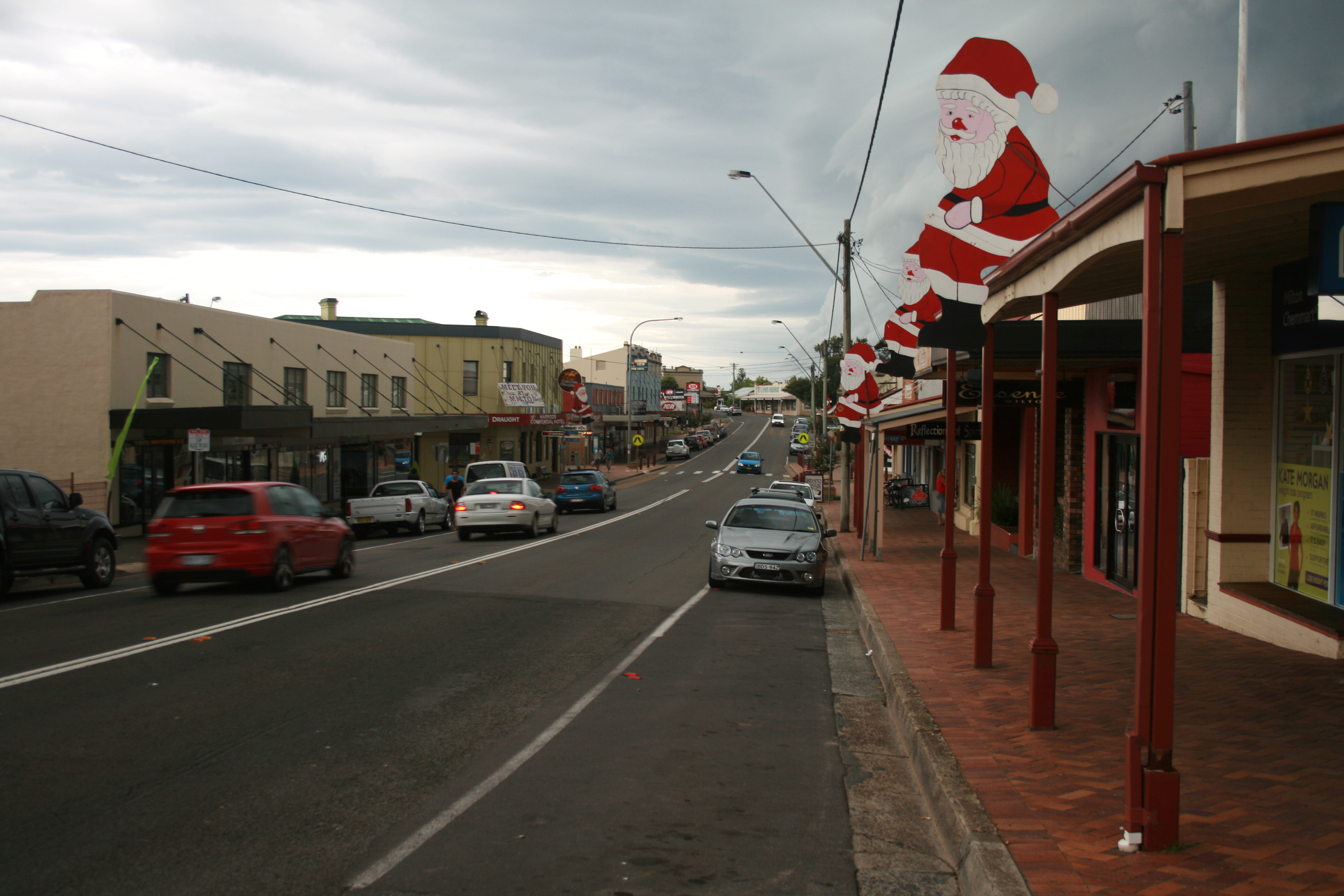
- The Princes Highway as it passes through Milton

- Coordinates: 35°19′S 150°26′E
- Country: Australia
- State: New South Wales
- Region: South Coast
- LGA: City of Shoalhaven
- Location: 6 km (3.7 mi) NW of Ulladulla; 59 km (37 mi) SSW of Nowra; 222 km (138 mi) SSW of Sydney
- Established: 1860

Government
  - State electorate: South Coast
  - Federal division: Gilmore
- Elevation: 76 m (249 ft)

Population
  - Total: 1,538 (UCL 2021)
- Postcode: 2538
- County: St Vincent
- Parish: Ulladulla
Localities around Milton
Little Forest	Yatte Yattah	Narrawallee
Croobyar	Milton	Mollymook Beach
Woodstock	Woodstock	Ulladulla

Milton is a village in the South Coast region of New South Wales, Australia, within the City of Shoalhaven. It was founded in 1860, named after the property of post master George Knight and became an important regional centre during the 19th Century. Today, Milton remains one of the two main commercial centres of the Milton-Ulladulla district, with a population at the 2016 census of 1,663. It is a popular stopping place for travellers on the Princes Highway which runs through the centre of town. In recent years, Milton has undergone a resurgence largely influenced by the local tourism industry and an influx of residents to the district seeking a seachange. Several new housing estates are being developed on the fringes of the village and new boutique stores, cafes and bed and breakfast type businesses have located in the town.

== History ==
The coastal area of the Milton-Ulladulla district was observed by Captain James Cook in 1770 when sailing along the east coast of Australia, before landing at Botany Bay. Cook noted the nearby Pigeon House Mountain, a prominent landmark.

The Reverend Thomas Kendall was the first European settler to the area, issued a land grant in nearby Yatte Yattah in 1827. He named the estate "Kendall Dale" and commenced pastoral activities as well as cutting red cedar found in abundance near Little Forest and Yackungarrah Creek. Poet Henry Kendall, the grandson of Thomas Kendall was born at the property in Yatte Yattah in 1839. Further land grants in the 1830s led to a town site being surveyed in 1837 at Boat Harbour (present day Ulladulla). The district prospered through the 1840s on the back of the timber industry.

Former convict, Henry Claydon took possession of 100 acres of land near Milton in 1855, establishing an estate known as Claydon Park. A devout Methodist, Claydon donated land in 1856 to the Wesleyan Church and the following year, the first church in the district was built on the site. The Sarah Claydon retirement village in Milton in named for Henry's wife, who worked as a Midwife in the area until her death in 1876. The village was formally established in 1860 as a private town on land owned by John Booth, soon after followed by the construction of several public buildings, including the Star Hotel (1860), St Peter and St Paul Anglican Church (1860), Uniting and Catholic churches (1872), Town Hall (1871), courthouse and public school (1877) and a post office (1880). As a town, Milton is classified with the Australian National Trust, due to the number of homes and buildings in the town that were built from 1870 onwards. The town has declined in importance as a regional centre through the 20th Century, but remains a popular tourist destination.

== Facilities and infrastructure ==
=== Health and Education ===
Milton has a public primary school; Milton Public School. Originally constructed in 1877, the school took its first enrollments in April 1878. From 1943 until 1973, it operated as a central school, catering for students of both primary and secondary age groups. The school has operated as a Kindergarten to Year 6 primary school since the beginning of 1974, and the original classroom is still in use alongside modern additions. Milton also has one private school. St Mary's Star of the Sea is a Catholic primary school located adjacent to the 1872 church. The Shoalhaven City Council operates a public library in the old town hall on the Princes Highway.

The Milton Ulladulla Hospital (MUH) located in the town provides accident and emergency, general ward, obstetric, oncology and outpatient facilities. The hospital services southern Shoalhaven area from Sussex Inlet south to North Durras as part of the South Eastern Sydney and Illawarra Area Health Service. A helipad on Croobyar Road is used by the hospital for emergency evacuations.

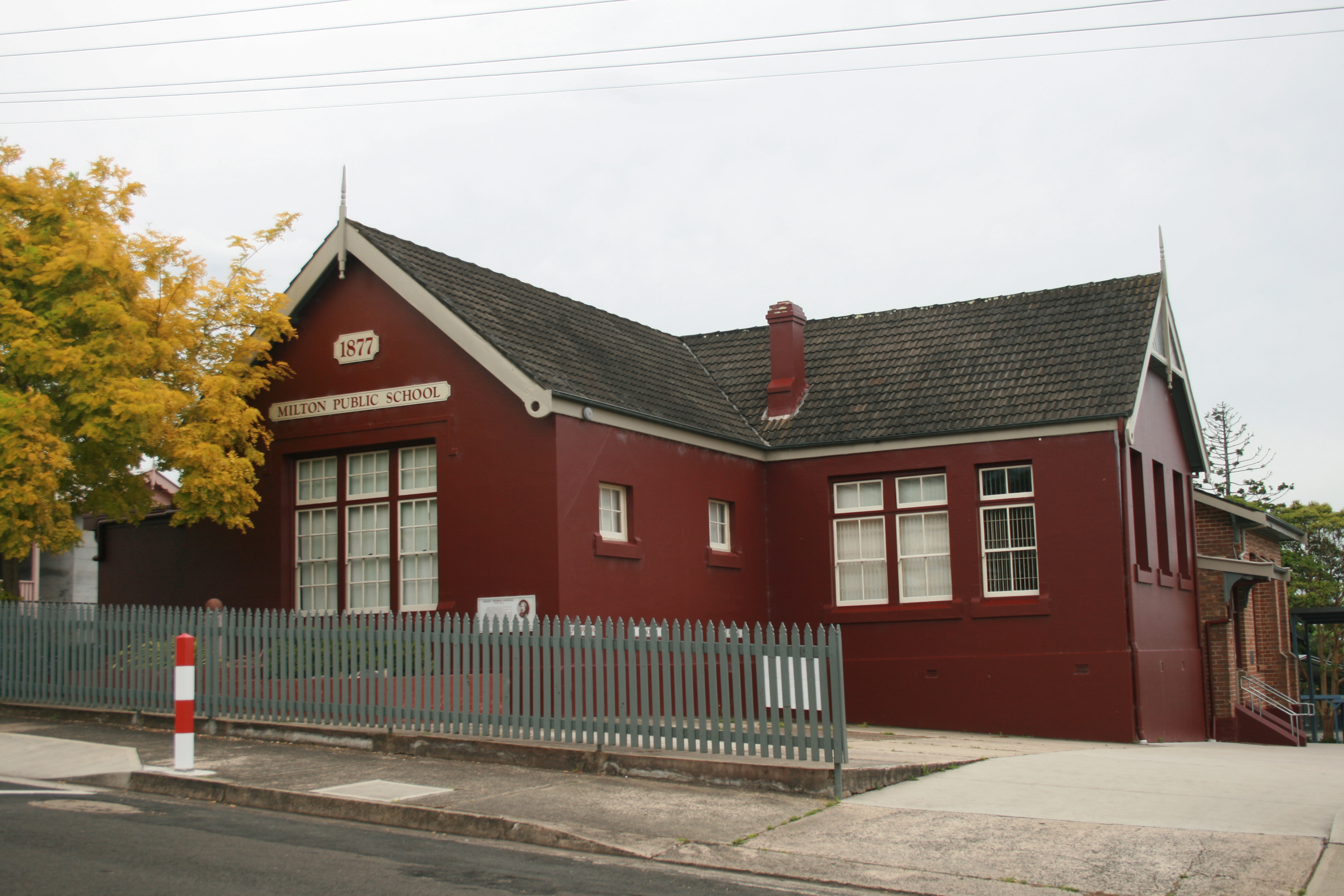
Milton Public School built in 1877

=== Public Transport ===
Milton is the northern terminus for local bus services operated by Ulladulla Buslines. The town is serviced by routes 740 and 740V to Burrill Lake via Narrawallee, Mollymook and Ulladulla six days per week. Taxis and private hire cars are also available throughout the district.

Premier Motor Service offer coach services on the South Coast which pick up in Milton travelling north to Nowra and Sydney, as well as south to Eden. Services operating to Nowra generally offer connections to Bomaderry railway station, the terminus of NSW TrainLink's Illawarra line.

=== Parks and recreation ===
Milton has a public swimming pool complex maintained by Shoalhaven City Council. The complex includes a 25m main pool, a shaded wading pool for toddlers and kiosk, along with picnic tables. The pools overlook the rural countryside, with views to the ocean. The Frogs Hollow sports ground located on Matron Porter Drive is home to the Milton Ulladulla Touch Football Association. Mick Ryan Park is a small botanical reserve containing a large heritage listed Illawarra little leaf fig tree believed to be over 180 years old. The tree covers a land area of close to one acre.

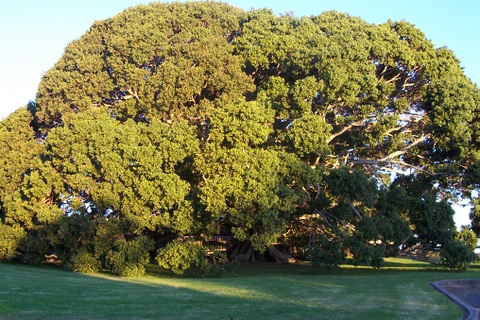
The fig tree (ficus obliqua) in Mick Ryan Park

Milton Theatre was originally built in 1927 as the Milton School of Arts and later used as a picture theatre before closing in 1993. The building was subsequently restored and now operates as a 200-seat venue hosting community performances, as well as visiting national and overseas artists. A grand reopening gala concert in July 1998 relaunched the theatre following a $460,000 renovation. The theatre also contains a recording studio and is managed by a community committee in cooperation with the Shoalhaven City Council. Notable artists who have performed at the theatre include Justin Townes Earle, Muddy Waters, Eric Bogle, Sarah Blasko and former Hunters & Collectors front man Mark Seymour who described it as the best live venue on the South Coast.

== Events and attractions ==
Milton hosts a number of annual events and festivals, drawing visitors from as far away as Victoria and the Australian Capital Territory. The Milton Show Society holds an annual agricultural show and exhibition featuring events including equestrian competition, produce displays, pet show and rodeo. The community event is held at the Milton Showgrounds on Croobyar Road on the first weekend in March. The Milton Scarecrow Festival is held annually on the King's Birthday long weekend in June. The festival involves a theme which locals and visitors are encouraged to interpret through decorating scarecrows. Entertainment includes live performances, art and craft markets, a farmyard petting zoo and children's rides. Milton Village markets are held on the first Saturday of every month and on long weekends

"The Settlement" is a row of Victorian era shops built in the 1870s on the Princes Highway at Milton. Businesses currently operating within this block include boutique restaurants and cafes, art galleries and antiques stores. Street markets focused around The Settlement are held on the first Saturday of each month as well as peak tourist times during Milton's festivals. Other activities available year-round include guided tours showcasing the town's heritage as well as "ghost walks" every Thursday and Saturday night for those hoping to catch a glimpse of supernatural happenings.

== Notable residents ==
- Winter Warden (1860–1936), a former member of the NSW Legislative Council lived in Milton.
- Perceval Shipton (1906–1972), member of the New South Wales Legislative Council.
