= Burrill Lake =

- Town
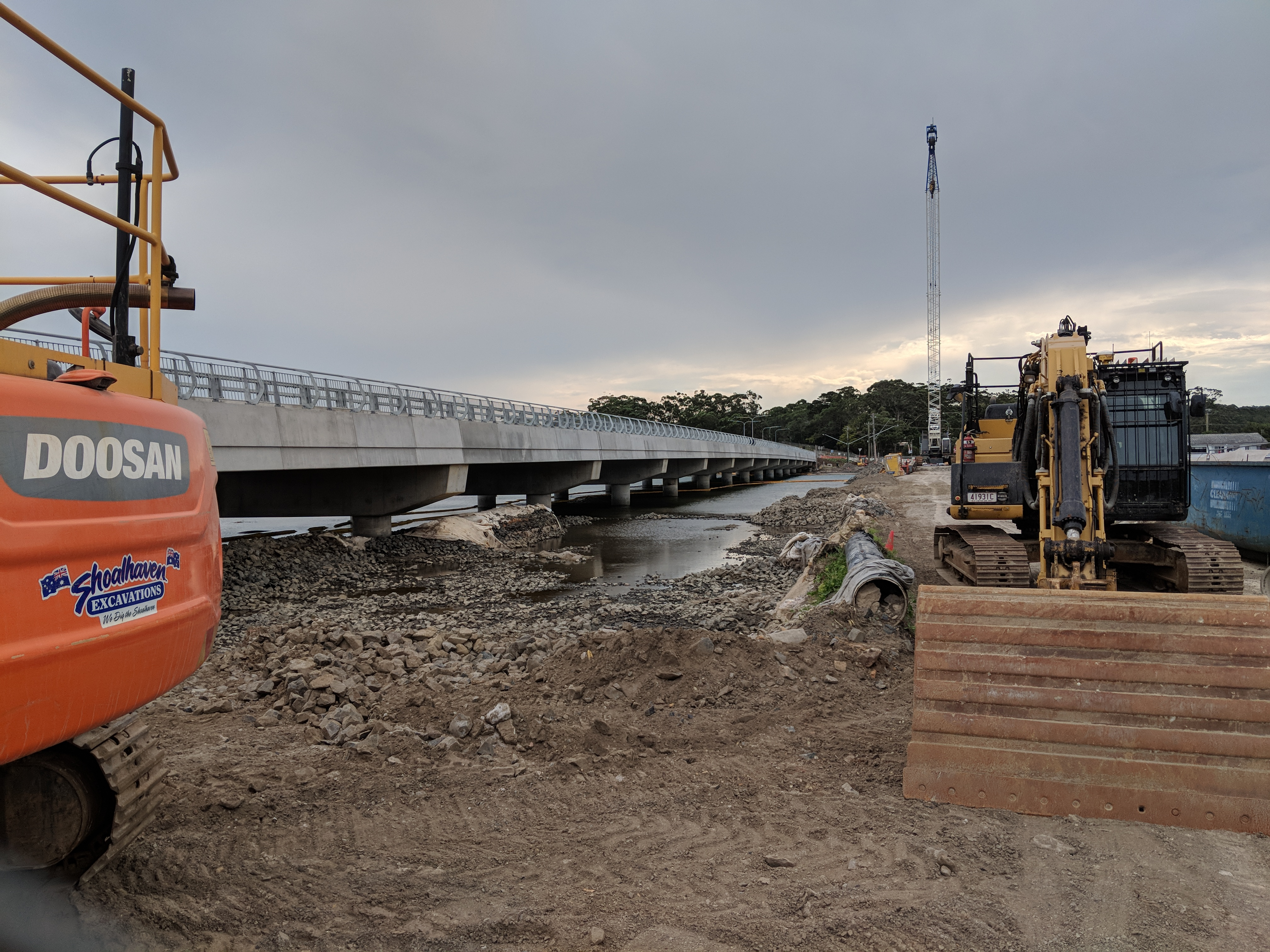
- New Bridge at Burrill Lake, old bridge being demolished on the right in January 2018

- Coordinates: 35°23′00″S 150°27′0″E
- Country: Australia
- State: New South Wales
- Region: South Coast
- LGA: City of Shoalhaven
- Location: 5 km (3.1 mi) S of Ulladulla; 75 km (47 mi) S of Nowra; 231 km (144 mi) SSW of Sydney

Government
  - State electorate: South Coast
  - Federal division: Gilmore

Population
  - Total: 1,782 (2021 census)
- Postcode: 2539
- County: St Vincent
- Parish: Ulladulla
Localities around Burrill Lake
Woodstock	Kings Point	Ulladulla
Woodburn	Burrill Lake	Tasman Sea
Woodburn	Tabourie Lake	Dolphin Point

Burrill Lake is a small village on the Princes Highway in the South Coast region of New South Wales, Australia. It is a seaside suburb of the Milton-Ulladulla district, a part of the City of Shoalhaven local government area and surrounds the lake of the same name. In 2021, Burrill Lake had a population of 1,782. The name of the town is derived from an Aboriginal word meaning 'wallaby'.

== History ==
The first inhabitants and traditional land owners of the area surrounding Burrill Lake were the Murramarang Indigenous people of the Yuin nation. The area is regarded as extremely significant archaeological site in terms of the age of some artifacts discovered nearby. In 1931, members of the Anthropological Society of New South Wales excavated an Aboriginal rock shelter believed to be in excess of 20,000 years old, the oldest known site on the Australian East Coast.

The first European settlers arrived in the mid 19th Century. The Ireland family took up an estate on the south side of the lake and built a timber mill. A bridge was first constructed across the estuary in 1881. A primary school opened in 1876 and operated until 1934. By the early 20th century, the collection of shell grit helped to diversify the local economy and experiments were conducted in the early 1900s to burn and calcify the grit to make lime with considerable success.

By the 1920s Burrill Lake had earned a reputation as a holiday destination, becoming popular with campers. This in turn led to growth in the town and the construction of new amenities. By the 1930s a mail service was in place, and by 1946 an open-air theatre was operating in the town.

== Present day ==
Burrill Lake remains a popular destination during the summer holidays, with several caravan parks and holiday rentals offering tourist accommodation close to town. The Big 4 Holiday Parks on the southern side of the lake also offers mini-golf, bird feeding and pedalo hire to the public. The estuary provides the angler with good fishing with many species encountered including snapper, flathead, bream, blackfish, whiting and blue swimmer crabs. The local beach also provides fishing where anglers can catch Australian salmon, whiting and tailor. There are two public boat ramps located in the town. Locally caught seafood is available through the fish and chip shop, which in 2012 was afforded the honour of the best in New South Wales.

The local branch of the Lions Club maintains a family-friendly barbecue area and parkland on the lake foreshore for the enjoyment of locals, travellers and visitors. Due to its close proximity to Ulladulla, local residents generally commute to services and employment opportunities. A number of businesses are located at Burrill Lake, including a grocery store, cafes and takeaway food stores, a post office/newsagency, liquor store, hairdresser and medical centre. The Shoalhaven City Council maintains an air conditioned community hall in town that is used by religious groups and community organisations on a regular basis. The town is serviced six days per week by local bus services to Ulladulla and other villages in the district by Ulladulla Bus Lines.

The nearest schools are Ulladulla Primary School and Ulladulla High School.

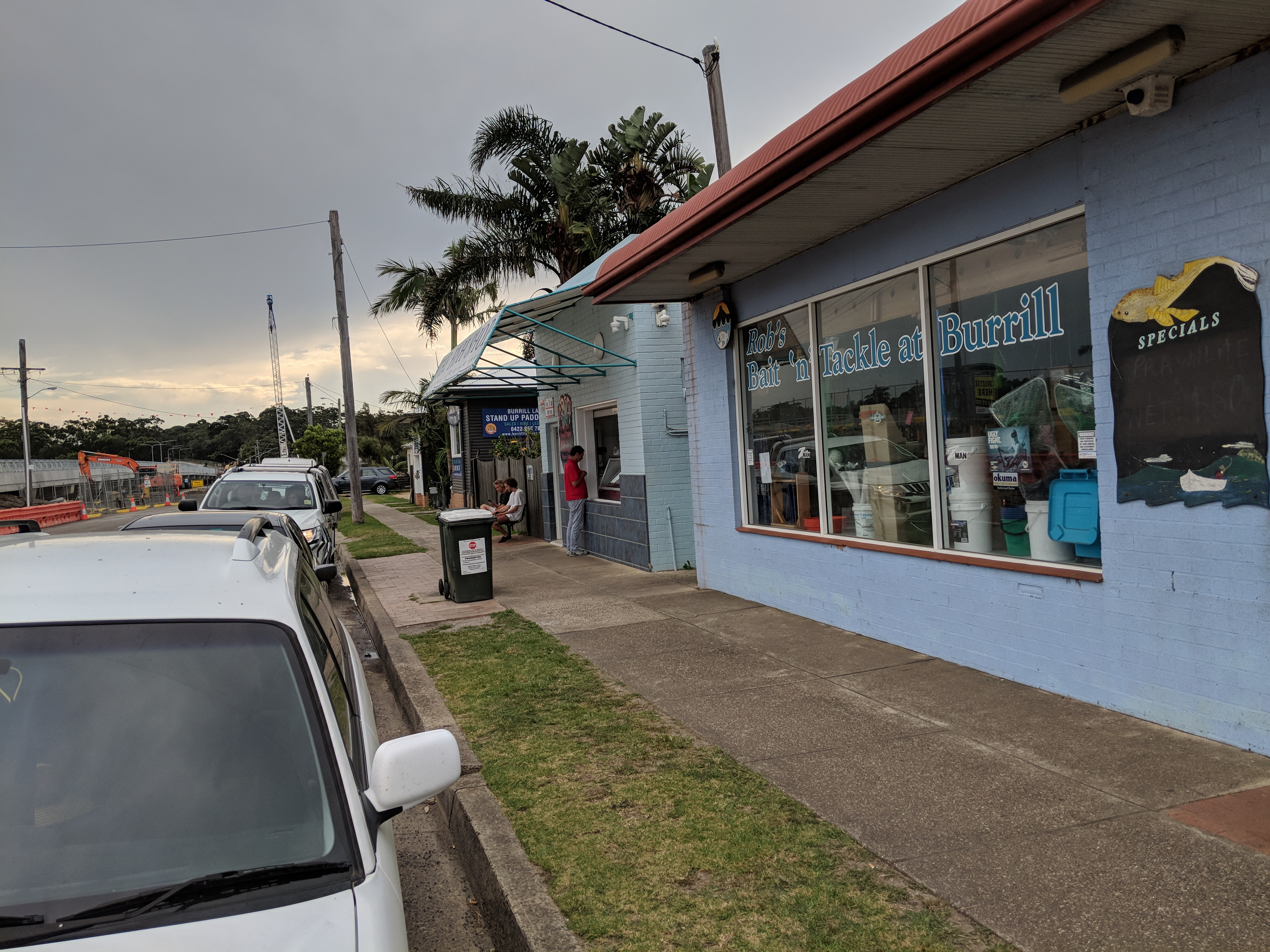
Shops on old Princes Highway at Burrill Lake

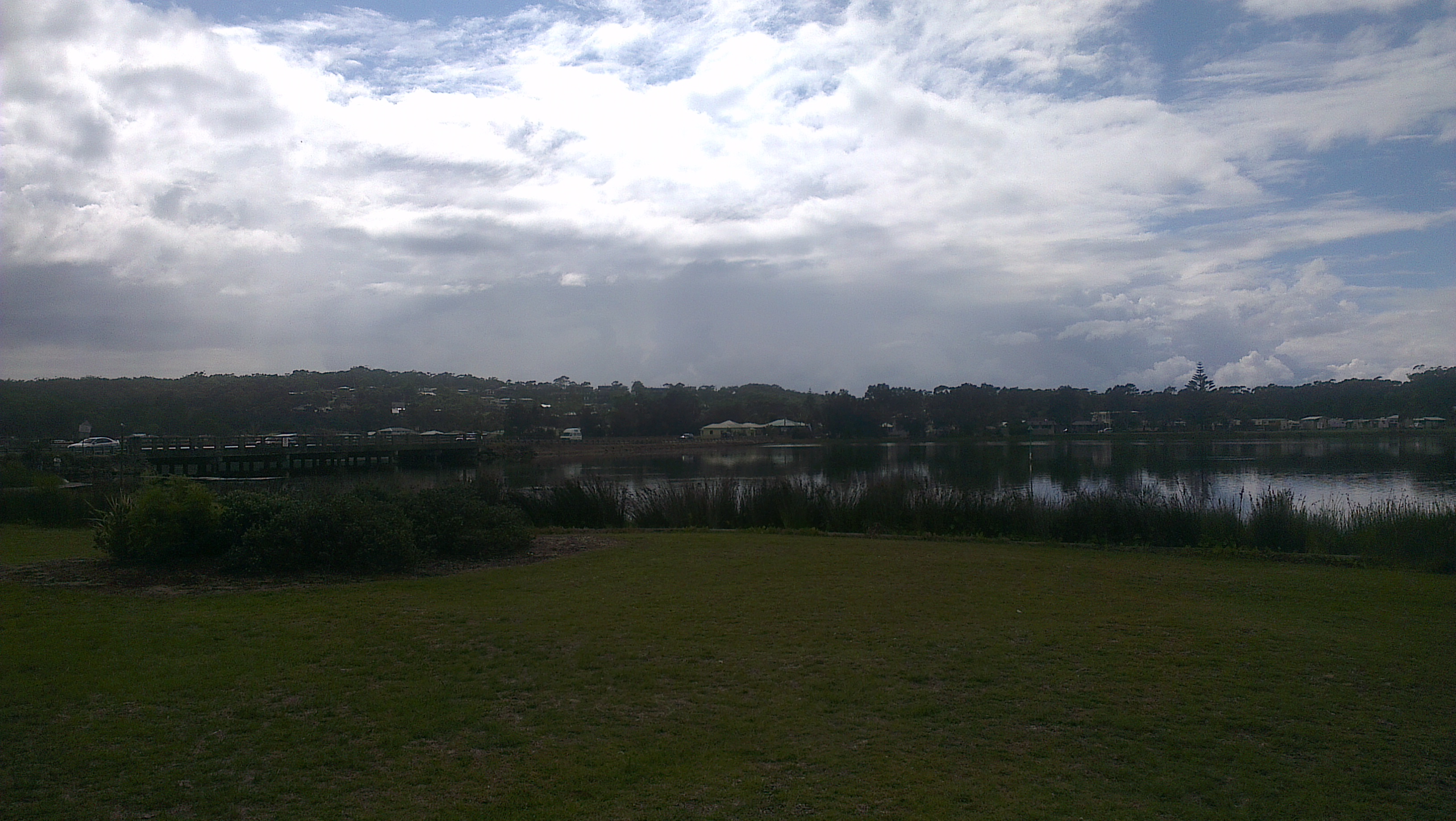
Burrill Lake from Lions Park
