= Ulladulla =

- Town
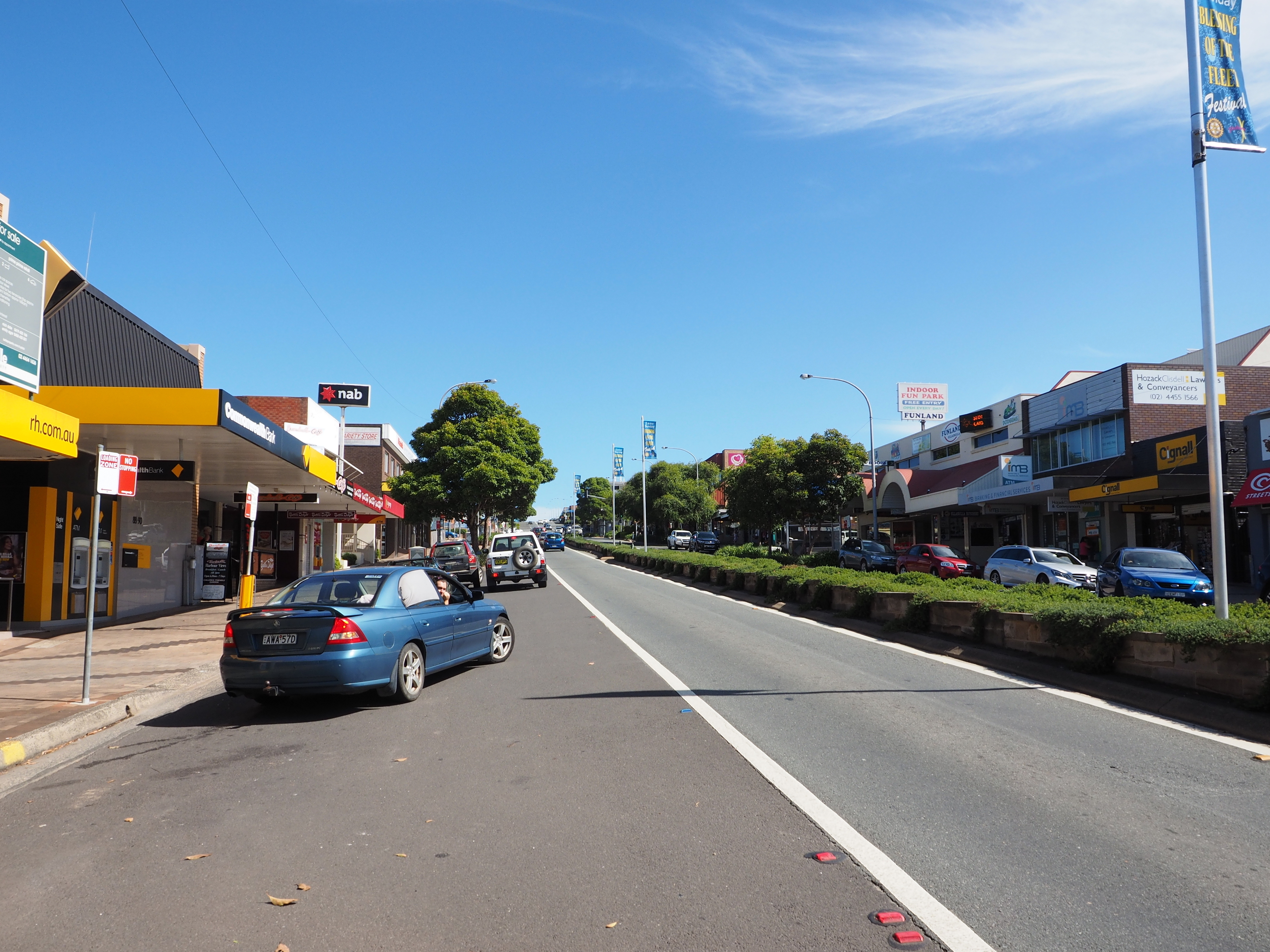
- Ulladulla town centre

- Coordinates: 35°20′55″S 150°28′4″E
- Country: Australia
- State: New South Wales
- Region: South Coast
- LGA: City of Shoalhaven
- Location: 223 km (139 mi) SSW of Sydney; 198 km (123 mi) E of Canberra; 64 km (40 mi) S of Nowra; 55 km (34 mi) NE of Batemans Bay

Government
  - State electorate: South Coast
  - Federal division: Gilmore
- Elevation: 15 m (49 ft)

Population
  - Total: 17,026 (2021)
- Postcode: 2539
- County: St Vincent
- Parish: Ulladulla
- Mean max temp: 20.7 °C (69.3 °F)
- Mean min temp: 13.4 °C (56.1 °F)
- Annual rainfall: 1,200.5 mm (47.26 in)
Localities around Ulladulla
Milton	Mollymook
Milton	Ulladulla	Tasman Sea
Kings Point	Burrill Lake

Ulladulla (/ˈʌlədʌlə/) is a coastal town in New South Wales, Australia in the City of Shoalhaven local government area. It is on the Princes Highway about 230 kilometres (140 mi) south of Sydney, halfway between Batemans Bay to the south and Nowra to the north. Ulladulla has close links with the nearby historic settlement of Milton and many services are shared between these towns.

== History ==
The name Ulladulla is the modern spelling of an Aboriginal word, the meaning of which is unknown. Some records show the name meaning "safe harbour", but local Aboriginal elders dispute that meaning and point out that a harbour for boats is a modern idea. The name was corrupted to "Holy Dollar" at one time. Alternative spellings as Woolladoorh or Ngulla-dulla have been recorded. The first European settler was Reverend Thomas Kendall in 1828 who started cutting Australian red cedar at Yackungarrah and Narrawallee Creek in Yatte Yattah, four kilometres north of present day Milton.

== Demographics ==
At the 2021 census, there were 17,026 people in Ulladulla.

- Aboriginal and Torres Strait Islander people made up 4.1% of the population.
- 80.9% of people were born in Australia. The most common other countries of birth were England 4.3%, New Zealand 1.4%, Scotland 0.6%, Italy 0.5% and Germany 0.5%.
- 90.3% of people only spoke English at home. Other languages spoken at home included Italian at 0.5%.
- The most common responses for religion were No Religion 41.5%, Catholic 19.7% and Anglican 17.6%.

Historical population
Year	Pop.	±%
1921	1,357	—
1933	1,415	+4.3%
1947	1,844	+30.3%
1954	1,210	−34.4%
1961	1,458	+20.5%
1966	1,661	+13.9%
1971	2,781	+67.4%
1976	4,271	+53.6%
1981	6,018	+40.9%
1986	7,408	+23.1%
1991	7,381	−0.4%
1996	8,384	+13.6%
2001	9,585	+14.3%
2006	10,298	+7.4%
2011	12,137	+17.9%
2016	13,054	+7.6%
2021	14,396	+10.3%
Source: Australian Bureau of Statistics data.

== Geography ==
The Ulladulla area is a seven-kilometre stretch of continuous urban residential development from the southern edge of Ulladulla, through the town of Mollymook, to Narrawallee in the north, terminating at the Narrawallee estuary. At the 2021 census the population of the suburb of Ulladulla was 7,262.

Ulladulla is surrounded by the adjoining towns of Milton and Burrill Lake as well as Mollymook and Narrawallee. The extended area from Burrill Lake to Milton is referred to as the Milton–Ulladulla area. The population of the Ulladulla area, including Milton, Narawallee and south to Dolphin Point was 16,495 as at June 2019, having grown an average of 1.66 percent year-on-year over the preceding five years.

Close landmarks include Pigeon House Mountain and The Castle, both named due to the unique shapes of the mountain. Pigeon House was sighted by Captain James Cook upon his journey along the eastern shores of Australia. Pigeon House has recently been renamed Didhol in deference to the elders of the Yuin tribe, who previously inhabited the area Ulladulla was built upon. The traditional name of the peak, Didhol, means "woman's breast", from the mountain's clear resemblance to the shape of a woman's breast.

=== Climate ===
Ulladulla has a warm oceanic climate (Köppen: Cfb) moderated by its position next to the Tasman Sea, with warm, rainy summers and mild, somewhat drier winters heavily affected by foehn winds off the ranges to the west. Average maxima vary from 24.4 °C (75.9 °F) in January to 16.5 °C (61.7 °F) in July, with minima from 17.7 °C (63.9 °F) in January and February to 9.0 °C (48.2 °F) in July. Rainfall is moderately abundant, averaging 1,185.3 mm (46.67 in) annually, and is spread across 138.5 rainy days (exceeding 0.2 mm (0.0079 in)).

On average, nearby Jervis Bay weather station to the northeast recorded 96.8 clear days and 133.9 cloudy days per annum. Extreme temperatures have ranged from 44.5 °C (112.1 °F) on 18 January 2013 to 2.5 °C (36.5 °F) on 10 July 1995. The wettest day recorded was 12 October 2012, with 233.0 mm (9.17 in) of rainfall.

Climate data for Ulladulla (35.36°S 150.48°E(36 m (118 ft) AMSL) (1990-2025)
Month	Jan	Feb	Mar	Apr	May	Jun	Jul	Aug	Sep	Oct	Nov	Dec	Year
Record high °C (°F)	44.5 (112.1)	42.4 (108.3)	38.0 (100.4)	34.5 (94.1)	27.2 (81.0)	23.5 (74.3)	25.8 (78.4)	27.9 (82.2)	35.4 (95.7)	36.6 (97.9)	40.0 (104.0)	41.4 (106.5)	44.5 (112.1)
Mean daily maximum °C (°F)	24.4 (75.9)	24.3 (75.7)	23.4 (74.1)	21.5 (70.7)	19.1 (66.4)	16.9 (62.4)	16.5 (61.7)	17.5 (63.5)	19.4 (66.9)	20.8 (69.4)	21.7 (71.1)	23.2 (73.8)	20.7 (69.3)
Mean daily minimum °C (°F)	17.7 (63.9)	17.8 (64.0)	16.6 (61.9)	14.1 (57.4)	11.9 (53.4)	9.9 (49.8)	9.0 (48.2)	9.4 (48.9)	10.9 (51.6)	12.5 (54.5)	14.3 (57.7)	16.1 (61.0)	13.4 (56.0)
Record low °C (°F)	10.6 (51.1)	9.9 (49.8)	10.0 (50.0)	8.1 (46.6)	5.9 (42.6)	3.3 (37.9)	2.5 (36.5)	3.4 (38.1)	3.7 (38.7)	4.8 (40.6)	6.3 (43.3)	7.9 (46.2)	2.5 (36.5)
Average precipitation mm (inches)	95.0 (3.74)	124.1 (4.89)	140.7 (5.54)	111.3 (4.38)	109.0 (4.29)	114.0 (4.49)	94.0 (3.70)	75.3 (2.96)	75.6 (2.98)	86.4 (3.40)	101.4 (3.99)	76.3 (3.00)	1,200.5 (47.26)
Average precipitation days (≥ 0.2 mm)	9.9	9.5	9.4	8.6	6.9	7.5	5.8	5.4	7.2	8.3	9.0	8.7	96.2
Average afternoon relative humidity (%)	71	73	70	67	64	72	59	56	60	63	67	71	66
Average dew point °C (°F)	16.5 (61.7)	17.4 (63.3)	16.0 (60.8)	12.9 (55.2)	10.4 (50.7)	7.8 (46.0)	6.4 (43.5)	6.6 (43.9)	8.4 (47.1)	10.4 (50.7)	12.2 (54.0)	15.1 (59.2)	11.7 (53.0)
Source: Bureau of Meteorology (1990–2025)

== Ulladulla Harbour ==
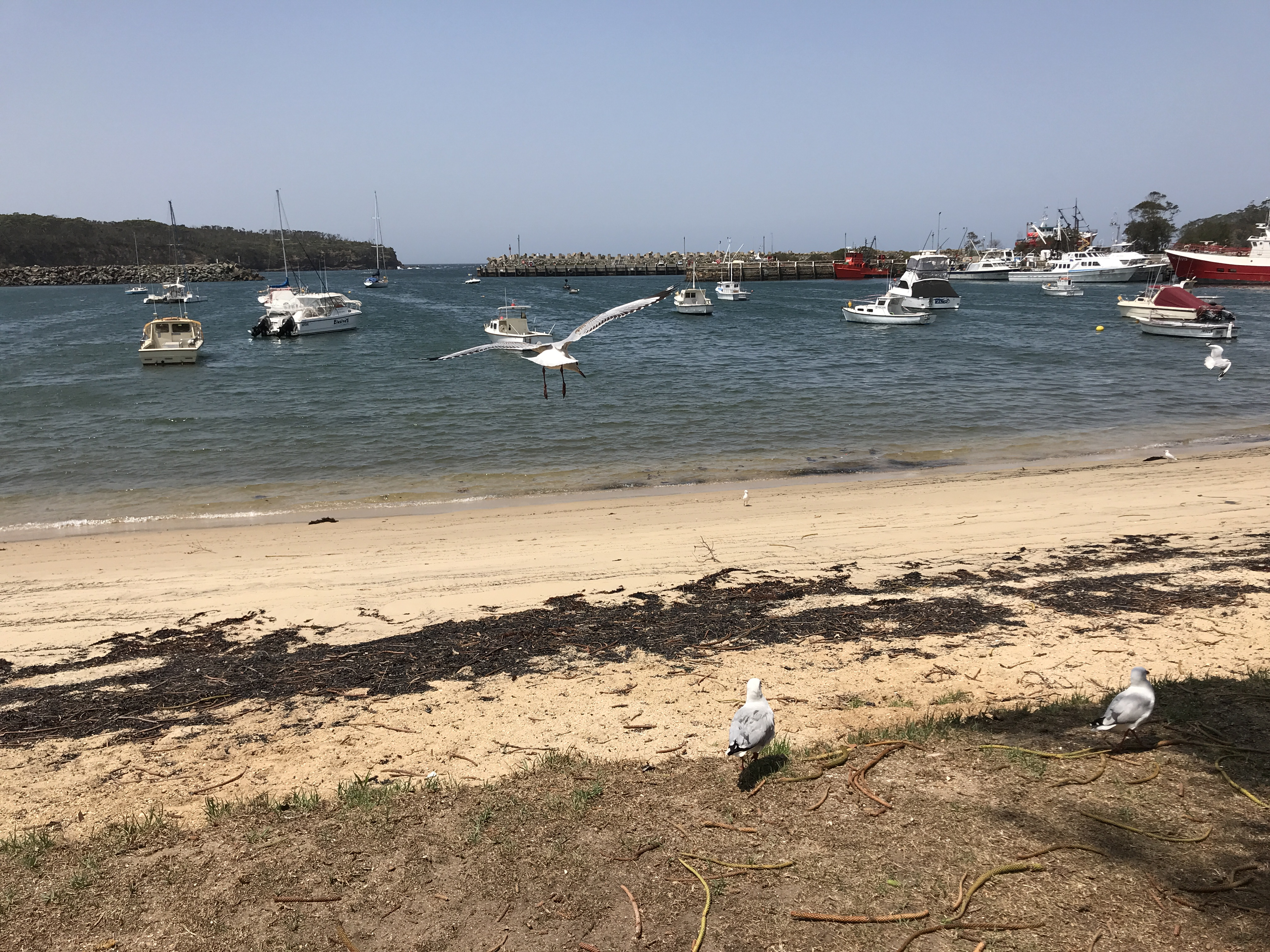
Ulladulla Harbour

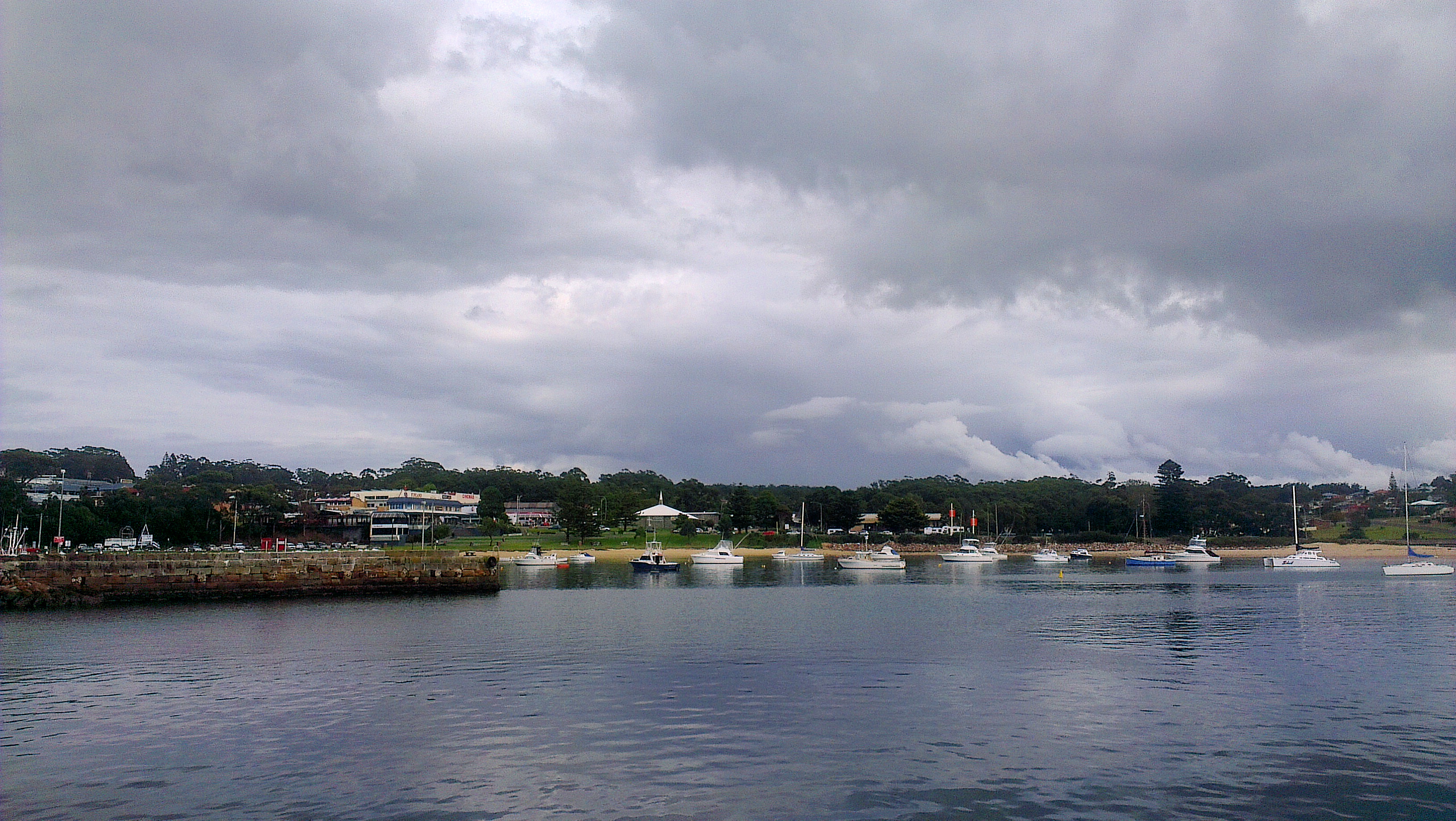
Small pleasure boats moored in Ulladulla Harbour

Ulladulla Harbour is a minor port administered by the Land & Property Management Authority.

The first white Settler was Rev Thomas Kendall in 1828 who started cedar cutting at Narrawallee Creek in Yatte Yattah.

A wooden jetty was built in 1859 so as to retain the services of the Illawarra Steam Navigation Company; the company had informed the farmers that would not call again at Ulladulla unless better mooring facilities were provided. After seven years the jetty was replaced by a stone pier built by the government on the natural reef. The company built a store on the harbour foreshores for the receiving of produce for shipment to and from Sydney. There was a weekly cargo service to Ulladulla until the mid-1950s. In 1873, a lighthouse was constructed on the harbour breakwater, and it was known at the time as the Ulladulla Lighthouse. It was relocated in 1889 to Warden Head, south of the harbour, where it is still active.

During the mid-1890s, a 4 ft (1220 mm) gauge tramway was laid out to the end of the main stone wharf. Manpower and horses were used to move the low wagons. During the period 1910–11, a double line of track was laid to the end of the pier. Public Works Department records disclose maintenance of track and repair of wagons at least to 1947–48. Almost all trace of the line had gone by 1991.

The harbour is the home port of the largest commercial fishing fleet on the South Coast of New South Wales.

=== Blessing of the Fleet festival ===
The Blessing of the Fleet festival has been held regularly at Easter since 1956. This is a centuries-old tradition which originated in Sicily, Italy, and has been continued by the area's descendants of the original Italian immigrant fishing community.

A significant element of the festival is the religious Blessing of the Fleet ceremony held at Ulladulla Harbour on Easter Sunday. The festivities conclude with fireworks display, over the harbour on Easter Sunday and the Harbour Markets on Easter Monday.

Although the accompanying celebration was cancelled due to a sharp rise in the public liability premium in 2004 and 2005, the ceremony returned in 2008. It was cancelled in 2020 and 2021 due to the COVID-19 pandemic, and in 2022 it returned but under COVID restrictions.

== Public transport ==
Premier Motor Service operate two daily service in each direction between Sydney and Eden as well as two services from Bomaderry railway station that connect with NSW TrainLink services.

Ulladulla Buslines provides local bus services on weekdays with a reduced service on Saturdays. Three routes operate from Ulladulla. Routes 740 and 740V run from Burrill Lake to Milton via Kings Point, Ulladulla, Mollymook and Narrawallee. Route 741 runs at a lesser frequency on weekdays only from Ulladulla to Kiola via Burrill Lake, Tabourie Lake, Termeil and Bawley Point. Taxis and private hire cars are also available for transport throughout the district.

== Commercial area ==
Ulladulla's commercial area is located along Princes Highway and in surrounding streets featuring numerous clusters of shops. Ulladulla Shopping Centre features a Woolworths supermarket and eight speciality stores. Dolphin Court contains a Coles supermarket and seven speciality stores, next to it is The Reject Shop. Ulladulla also has an Aldi supermarket, Bunnings, Mitre 10, Best & Less, Harris Scarfe and a K Hub store (formerly Target Country, closed February 2021). Ulladulla's arcades are located on Princes Highway including Rowen's Arcade which contain a cinema, Funland arcade and 23 speciality stores. Eastside Mall, Plaza, Riviera Arcade, Phillip Centre and Bellbrook Arcade are also located along Princes Highway.

== Education ==
Ulladulla Public School was established in August 1861. Ulladulla High School opened in January 1974.

== Notable people ==
- Winter Warden MLC (1860–1936), parliamentarian was born in Ulladulla
- Alexander Shand (1865–1949), barrister and King's Counsel and Royal Commissioner was born in Ulladulla
- Colonel Alfred Warden VD (1868–1955), soldier, military engineer and architect was born in Ulladulla

== Media ==
Ulladulla has since 1878 been served by the now online newspaper the Milton Ulladulla Times, which ran hard copy papers until August 2024 and as of 2026 retains an online presence. Ulladulla receives five free-to-air television channels from Knights Hill, commercial channels Seven, WIN and Network 10, and public broadcasters ABC and SBS. Due to tropospheric ducting from Newcastle in the Shoalhaven area via Knights Hill, a translator site at Milton is an alternative source of television reception and assists those affected by the Newcastle ducting.

== Parliamentary representation ==
Ulladulla is in the federal division of Gilmore, represented by Labor MP Fiona Phillips. Ulladulla is in the state seat of South Coast, represented by Labor’s Liza Butler.
