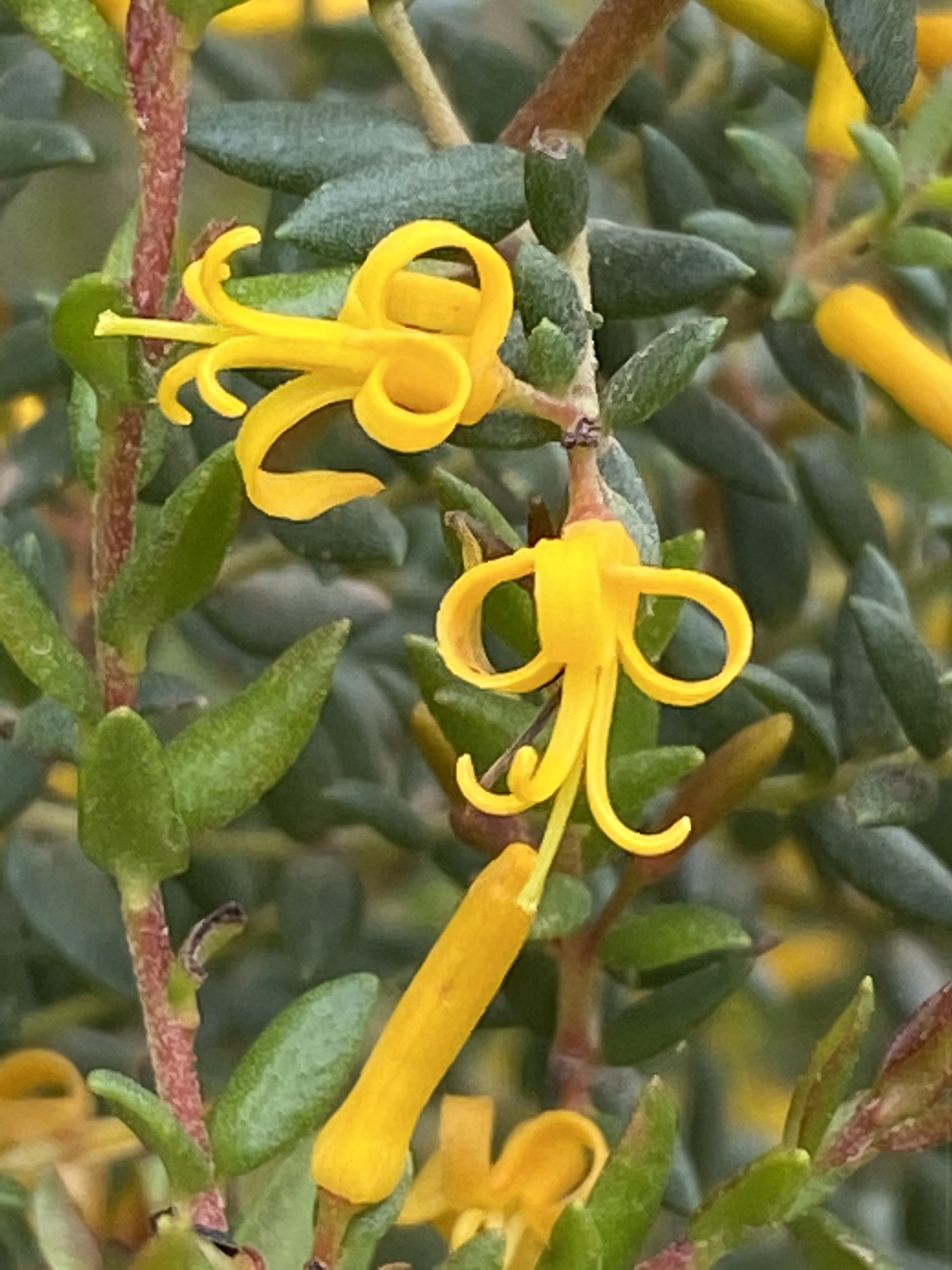
- Persoonia mollis subsp. livens Penrose National Park

Scientific classification
- Kingdom: Plantae
- Clade: Tracheophytes
- Clade: Angiosperms
- Clade: Eudicots
- Order: Proteales
- Family: Proteaceae
- Genus: Persoonia
- Species: P. mollis

Binomial name
- Persoonia mollis R.Br.

Synonyms
- Linkia mollis (R.Br.) Kuntze; Persoonia myrsinitis Meisn. nom. inval.

= Persoonia mollis =

Soft geebung

Species of flowering plant

Persoonia mollis, commonly known as soft geebung, is a plant in the family Proteaceae and is endemic to New South Wales. It is an erect to prostrate shrub with linear to oblong or spatula-shaped leaves, yellow flowers in groups of up to thirty on a rachis up to 150 mm (5.9 in) long and relatively small fruit.

== Description ==
Persoonia mollis is an erect to prostrate shrub that typically grows to a height of 0.2–5 m (7.9 in – 16 ft 4.9 in) and has smooth bark and young branchlets that are covered with greyish to rust-coloured hairs. The leaves are linear, oblong to lance-shaped or spatula-shaped, 15–120 mm (0.59–4.72 in) long, 0.8–17 mm (0.031–0.669 in) wide and much paler on the lower surface. The flowers are arranged in groups of up to thirty along a rachis up to 150 mm (5.9 in) long that grows into a leafy shoot after flowering, each flower on a pedicel about 1–3 mm (0.039–0.118 in) long, usually with a leaf at the base. The tepals are yellow, 8–11.5 mm (0.31–0.45 in) long and hairy on the outside. Flowering mostly occurs from late December to May and the fruit is a green drupe about 8 mm (0.31 in) long and 7 mm (0.28 in) wide.

== Taxonomy ==
Persoonia mollis was first formally described in 1810 by Robert Brown in Transactions of the Linnean Society of London.

In 1991, Siegfried Krauss and Lawrie Johnson described nine subspecies of P. mollis in the journal Telopea, and the names are accepted by the Australian Plant Census:

- Persoonia mollis subsp. budawangensis S.Krauss & L.A.S.Johnson is an erect shrub, 1.2–4 m (3 ft 11 in – 13 ft 1 in) tall with small, oblong leaves mostly 15–60 mm (0.59–2.36 in) long and 0.8–6 mm (0.031–0.236 in) wide and is endemic to the Budawang Range;
- Persoonia mollis subsp. caleyi (R.Br.) S.Krauss & L.A.S.Johnson is an erect shrub, 1.2–4 m (3 ft 11 in – 13 ft 1 in) tall with small, linear to narrow lance-shaped leaves 30–60 mm (1.2–2.4 in) long and less than 6 mm (0.24 in) wide;
- Persoonia mollis subsp. ledifolia (A.Cunn. ex Meisn.) S.Krauss & L.A.S.Johnson is an erect shrub, 1.2–4 m (3 ft 11 in – 13 ft 1 in) tall with small, oblong leaves mostly 20–40 mm (0.79–1.57 in) long and 0.8–6 mm (0.031–0.236 in) wide and is found between Fitzroy Falls and Kangaroo Valley;
- Persoonia mollis subsp. leptophylla S.Krauss & L.A.S.Johnson is a dense, compact shrub 0.8–1.5 m (2 ft 7 in – 4 ft 11 in) high with bright green, linear to thread-like leaves 0.8–1.5 mm (0.031–0.059 in) wide that are sparsely hairy on the lower surface;
- Persoonia mollis subsp. livens S.Krauss & L.A.S.Johnson is a dense, compact shrub 0.8–1.5 m (2 ft 7 in – 4 ft 11 in) high with green to greyish, linear to thread-like leaves 0.8–1.5 mm (0.031–0.059 in) wide that are densely hairy on the lower surface;
- Persoonia mollis subsp. maxima S.Krauss & L.A.S.Johnson has large, soft, lance-shaped leaves 40–80 mm (1.6–3.1 in) long and 6–17 mm (0.24–0.67 in) wide, the flower buds covered with copper-coloured hairs about 2–3 mm (0.079–0.118 in) long;
- Persoonia mollis R.Br. subsp. mollis has large, soft, lance-shaped leaves 40–80 mm (1.6–3.1 in) long and 6–17 mm (0.24–0.67 in) wide, the flower buds densely covered with whitish hairs about 1 mm (0.039 in) long;
- Persoonia mollis subsp. nectens S.Krauss & L.A.S.Johnson has large, pliable but not soft, lance-shaped leaves 40–80 mm (1.6–3.1 in) long and 6–17 mm (0.24–0.67 in) wide, and flower buds sparsely covered with whitish hairs about 0.5 mm (0.020 in) long;
- Persoonia mollis subsp. revoluta S.Krauss & L.A.S.Johnson is a prostrate, spreading shrub, 0.1–0.5 m (3.9 in – 1 ft 7.7 in) tall and up to 4 m (13 ft) wide, with oblong to egg-shaped leaves 30–60 mm (1.2–2.4 in) long and more than 6 mm (0.24 in) wide.

== Distribution and habitat ==
Soft geebung grows from heath to forest, usually on sandstone, from the Blue Mountains and Hawkesbury River south to the Clyde River.

- Subspecies budawangensis grows from woodland to forest and is endemic to the Budawang Range;
- Subspecies caleyi grows in forest between Jervis Bay and Durras Lake on the South Coast;
- Subspecies ledifolia occurs between Kangaloon, the Shoalhaven River, Jamberoo and Wingello where it grows from heath to forest on Hawkesbury Sandstone;
- Subspecies leptophylla is found between the Shoalhaven River, Budawang Range, Nerriga and Nowra and on the Beecroft Peninsula where it grows in heath and forest on Nowra and Conjola sandstones;
- Subspecies livens is found between Penrose, Goulburn and Braidwood, growing in woodland on metasedimentary rock and conglomerate;
- Subspecies maxima grows in forest on Hawkesbury sandstone in the Cowan-Hornsby area;
- Subspecies mollis is found in forest on sandstone in the Blue Mountains;
- Subspecies nectens occurs between Oakdale, Hill Top and the Illawarra Escarpment where it grows in forest;
- Subspecies revoluta grows in forest on Hawkesbury sandstone between Nattai Gorge, Bullio, Berrima and Canyonleigh.
