= Yatte Yattah =

- Suburb
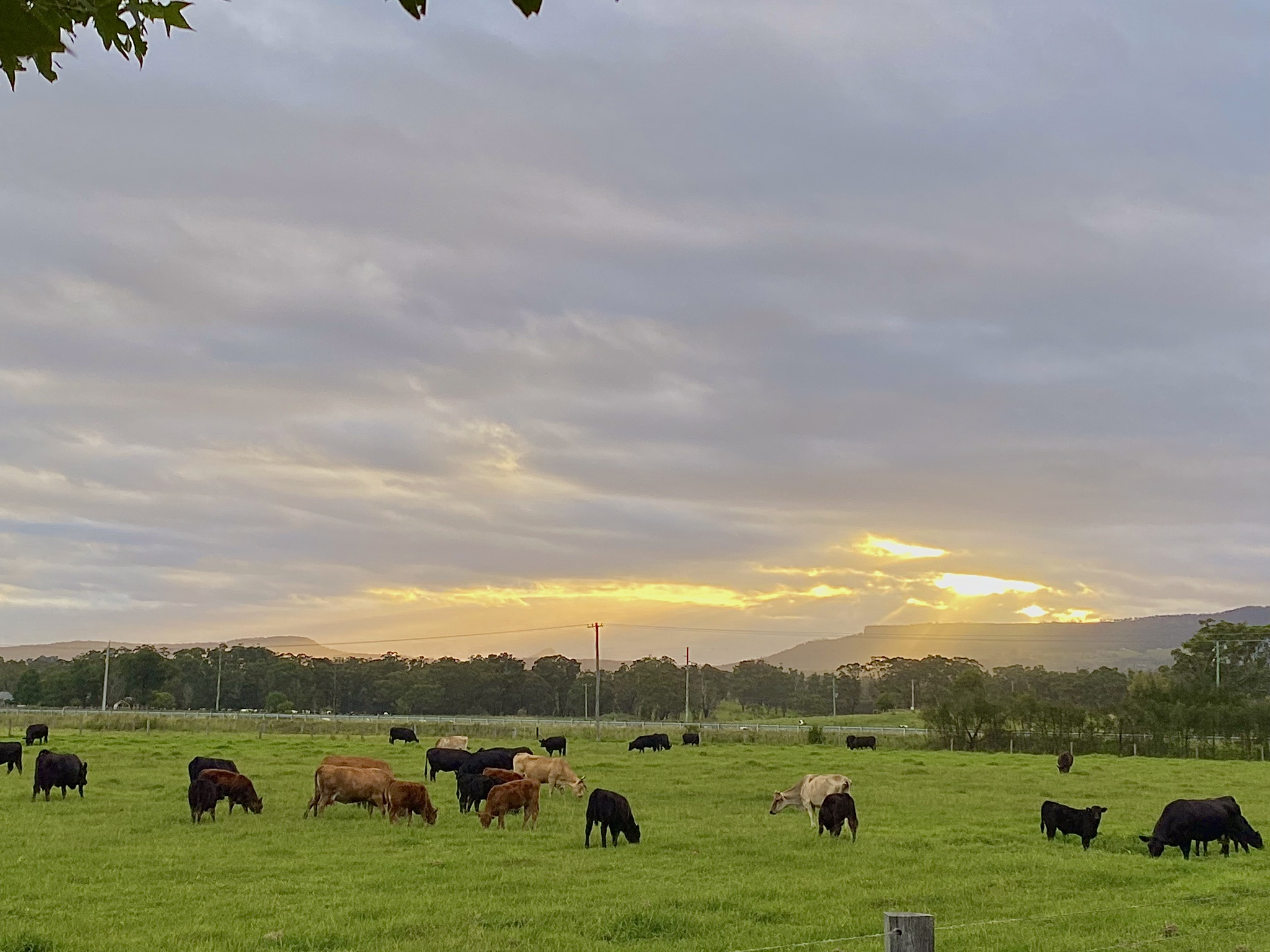
- Yatte Yattah looking towards Pigeon House Mountain

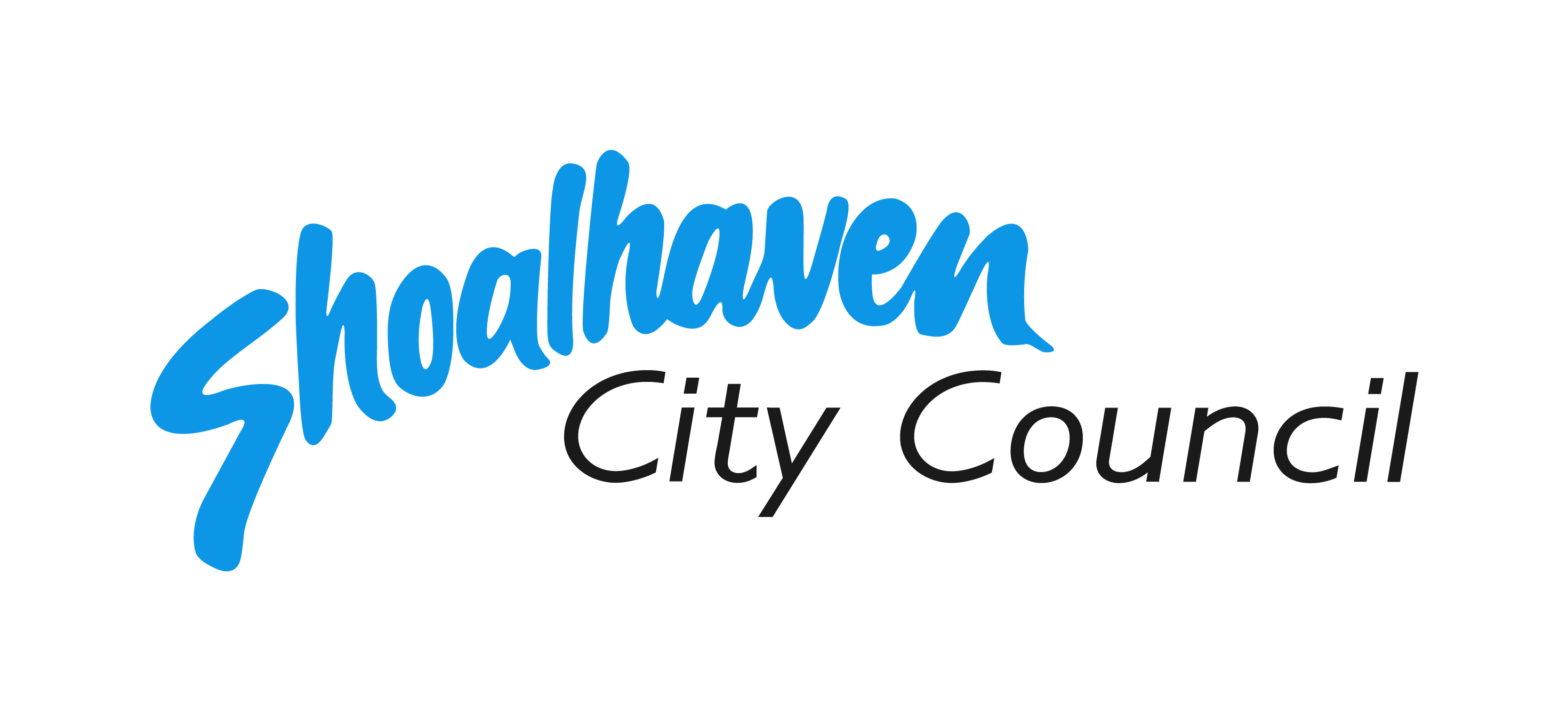

- Coordinates: 35°16′55″S 150°25′15″E
- Country: Australia
- State: New South Wales
- Region: South Coast
- LGA: City of Shoalhaven
- Location: 13 km (8.1 mi) NW of Ulladulla; 59 km (37 mi) S of Nowra; 218 km (135 mi) SSW of Sydney; 6 km (3.7 mi) NE of Lake Conjola

Government
  - Mayor: Amanda Findley
  - State electorate: South Coast
  - Federal division: Gilmore
- Elevation: 15 m (49 ft)

Population
  - Total: 189 (SAL 2021)
- Postcode: 2539
- County: St Vincent
- Parish: Conjola
Suburbs around Yatte Yattah
Conjola	Conjola	Conjola Park
Pointer Mountain	Yatte Yattah	Lake Conjola
Little Forest	Milton	Lake Conjola

Yatte Yattah (pronounced 'Yadda Yadda') is a historically significant suburb on the South Coast of New South Wales. It is located on the Princes Highway about 4 km north of Milton and 2 km south of Conjola Lake. At the 2021 Census, the population was 189.

Settled in 1827, Yatte Yattah was a pioneer town in the decades preceding the establishment of nearby Milton and Ulladulla. Selected at the time for its highly fertile soils and lucrative red cedar, the first settlers in Yatte Yattah used convicts to procure timber, build roads and dig extensive drains along Narrawallee Creek. In 1827 a local aboriginal man helped Thomas Kendall cut a track from his land grant in Yatte Yattah to a natural bay in the south. Kendall turned the bay into a boat harbour so he could ship cedar and produce from Yatte Yattah to Sydney and Illawarra. Eventually this makeshift port would become known as Ulladulla Harbour. During this boom period Yatte Yattah had a functioning school, church and post office.

Today, Yatte Yattah is characterised by picturesque farming estates and private rural retreats. There are views of Pigeon House Mountain and the Budawang Ranges. There are many surfing beaches near Yatte Yattah and with increasing popularity the highway is known to become congested during peak holiday season.

== History ==
Yatte Yattah was the first area settled by Europeans in the Milton-Ulladulla district. The first land grant of 1,280 acres (5.2 km^{2}) in the region was issued in 1827 to Reverend Thomas Kendall (1778–1832). The land he settled upon would later be named Yatte Yattah, words derived from local aboriginal language thought by some to mean 'waterfall'. On this land he built his residence ‘Kendall Dale’. There he ran cattle and felled timber including Australian red cedar, utilising ticket-of-leave men for labour. Kendall travelled often from Ulladulla to Sydney but was drowned when his cargo ship, the Brisbane, was wrecked off Jervis Bay.

Yatte Yattah was designated as the site for a new and prosperous township on the South Coast. A schoolhouse, post office and church were erected near current day Tierney Road above Currowar Creek.

Decades later when the private township of Milton was incorporated by timbergetters 4 km to the south, plans to develop Yatte Yattah into a fully fledged town were abandoned.

== Agriculture ==
The stretch of land between Yatte Yattah and Milton has been described as having some of the finest pastoral land in the state.

Yatte Yattah was recognised by early colonial settlers for its highly productive farmland, particularly in Boolgatta Flat where James Warden used ticket-of-leave convict labour to build an extensive network of drains along the freshwater portion of Narrawallee Creek, to make better use of the alluvial soils.

Crops of oat and corn were grown in the 19th and early 20th century. Beef and dairy cattle grazing now make up the majority of farms in Yatte Yattah. The number of dairy farms in the area has been declining over the past few decades, with beef taking its place.

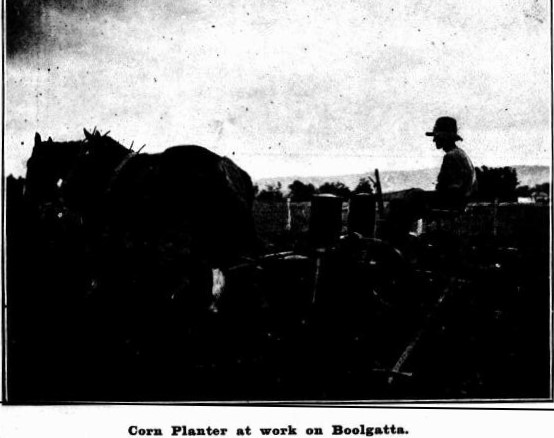
Corn planter at work on Boolgatta Flat, 1908

== Biodiversity ==
Although large swathes of rainforest were cleared by early settlers, Yatte Yattah remains rich in biodiversity and is surrounded by numerous nature reserves. Morton National Park and Little Forest Plateau are nearby to the west, Conjola National Park and Yatteyattah Nature Reserve are in the north and Narrawallee Nature Reserve is to the east. Yatte Yattah has a diverse range of habitats including remnant Milton Rainforest, several freshwater creeks and tidal mangrove flats to the east. Yatte Yattah is part of the Budawang Atlas of Life Project which seeks to document biodiversity in the region.

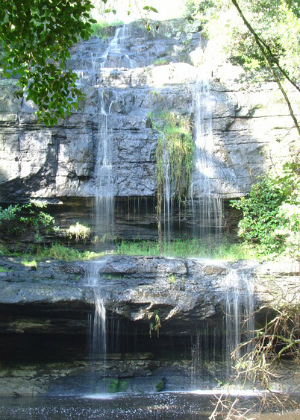
A waterfall in Yatteyattah Nature Reserve

== Geography ==
Yatte Yattah is located in a fertile stretch of hills and valleys between the Pacific Ocean to the East and the steep escarpment of Little Forest Plateau to the west. Lake Conjola is to the North and Milton, Mollymook and Ulladlla are to the South. The Princes Highway runs north to south through Yatte Yattah. The Milton Ulladulla Bypass has been planned for completion in Late 2029.

=== Creeks ===
Yatte Yattah sits within two water catchments with the vast majority flowing into Narrawallee Inlet. The area north of Lake Conjola Entrance Road flows into Lake Conjola.

There are four named creeks running through Yatte Yattah.

- Currowar Creek
- Yackungarrah Creek
- Narrawallee Creek
- Myrtle Gully

== Geology ==
Yatte Yattah is primarily composed of Milton Monzonite and Permian sediments formed in the Early Triassic period. The flat stretch of land along Boolgatta Flat featuring deep alluvial soils was formed from ancient glacial infilling during the last ice age.

== Notable people ==
=== Reverend Thomas Kendall (1778–1832). ===
From his large estate in Yatte Yattah, Thomas Kendall played a pivotal role in the early development of the Milton-Ulladulla area. He died at sea when his merchant ship carrying red cedar sank off Jervis Bay.

=== Henry Kendall ===
Acclaimed Australian poet Henry Kendall and grandson of Thomas Kendall was born in a shack on the banks of Yackungarrah Creek. He wrote poems inspired by the scenery of Yatte Yattah.

=== James Warden ===
Labelled as a 'South Coast Pioneer', James Warden was a shipwright, Australian politician in the NSW Legislative Assembly and purchaser of Boolgatta Estate, Yatte Yattah. Warden Head, the location of Ulladulla Lighthouse is named after Warden and his rival brother.

=== Max Atkins ===
Max Atkins was mayor of Shoalhaven from 1987 until 1999 and an award-winning breeder of stud French Limousin beef cattle at former Willowbank Estate, Yatte Yattah. Atkins' historic house was destroyed in the Currowan fire.

== Historic buildings ==
Yatte Yattah has several heritage listed homes dating from early settlement in the 1830s.

=== Kendall Dale ===
One of the oldest residences on the South Coast. A heritage listed Victorian Georgian house constructed from rendered rubble. It was built by convicts in 1848 after the original homestead burned down. It is located on the Princes Highway.

=== Boolgatta House ===
Boolgatta is one of the finest homesteads in the Shoalhaven. The Victorian Georgian Mansion was constructed by James Poole for pioneer James Warden. Warden designed the house to rival the prestige of Airlie House owned by his brother and bitter rival, David Warden. It is located on the Princes Highway.

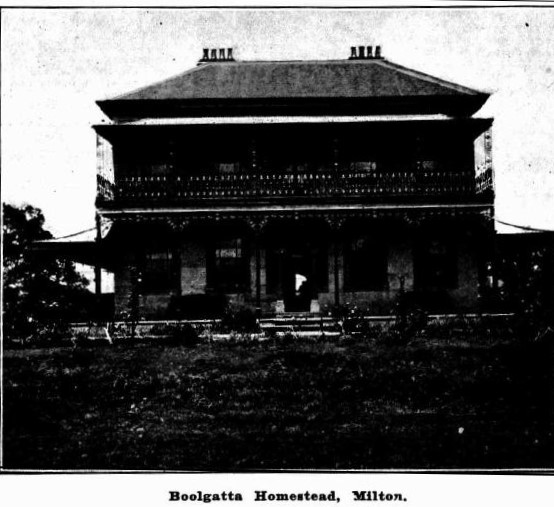
Boolgatta Homestead

=== Kirmington ===
Kirmington is a Victorian Georgian residence listed on the Register of the National Estate for its historical significance. It is located on the Kendall Dale estate on the Princes Highway.

=== Whoppindally House ===
Whoppindally is a heritage listed farmhouse constructed in 1867 for Thomas Robert and Margaret Kendall. It is located on the Princes Highway.

=== Yatte Yattah Cheese Factory ===
The Yatte Yattah Cheese Factory was built by the Yatteyattah Co-operative Dairy Company in 1907 with the objective to produce butter. The location for the building was chosen for its proximity to the 'rich loamy soils' of Boolgatta Flat which produced high quality dairy. As of 2023 the building has been repurposed but remains highly visible at E380 Princes Highway.

=== Former Yatte Yattah Public School and schoolmaster's residence ===
In the 19th century and before the establishment of Milton just to the north, Yatte Yattah had been the designated site for a new town. A school and post office were built. Both heritage listed buildings were destroyed in the Currowan fire. The location was at 8A Tierney Road. Images of the formerly heritage listed buildings are scarce.

== Cemeteries ==
- "Hillview" private cemetery located at 8B Tierney Road, Princes Highway (Lot 6, DP 32380)
- Roman Catholic Church and cemetery located at Princes Highway (Lot 138, DP 755923)
- The Sheaffe Family Cemetery located at Pointer Road (Lot 17, DP 847482)

== Public transport ==
There is a bus stop at the Lake Conjola turn off in Yatte Yattah. Premier Motor Service operate two daily services in each direction between Sydney and Eden as well as two services from Bomaderry railway station that connect with NSW TrainLink services.

== Black Summer ==
Parts of Yatte Yattah were impacted by the large Currowan fire during the 2019–20 Black Summer fire season. A number of businesses, properties and homes were destroyed on New Year's Eve including the Eagleview Farm Piggery and the Yatte Yattah Nursery. Two bodies were located inside burned out vehicles near the Princes Highway the following day. The Currowan fire predominantly impacted the elevated topography of Yatte Yattah with the low-lying alluvial flats mostly unaffected. The cleared grazing land at Boolgatta Flat acted as a protective buffer.

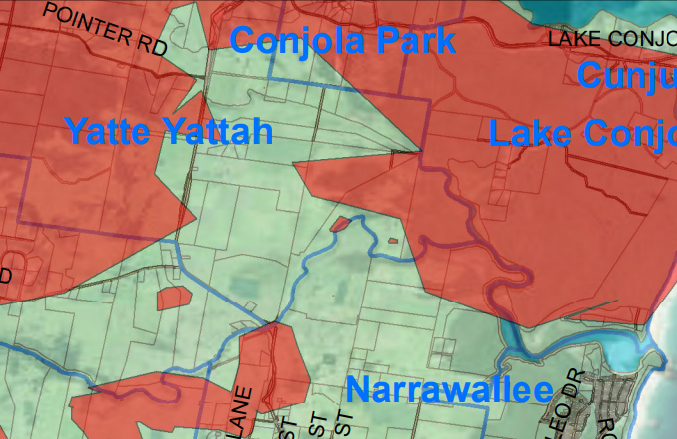
Scar map of the 2019/2020 Currowan Fire at Yatte Yattah (South)

== Localities ==
- Boolgatta Flat
- Big Hole - A historical landmark and freshwater swimming hole at the junction of Currowar and Yackungarrah Creeks. It was a culturally significant meeting place for the local indigenous people prior to european settlement.

== See also ==
- Yatteyattah Nature Reserve
- Milton Monzonite
