= Conjola Formation =

Geological formation in eastern Australia

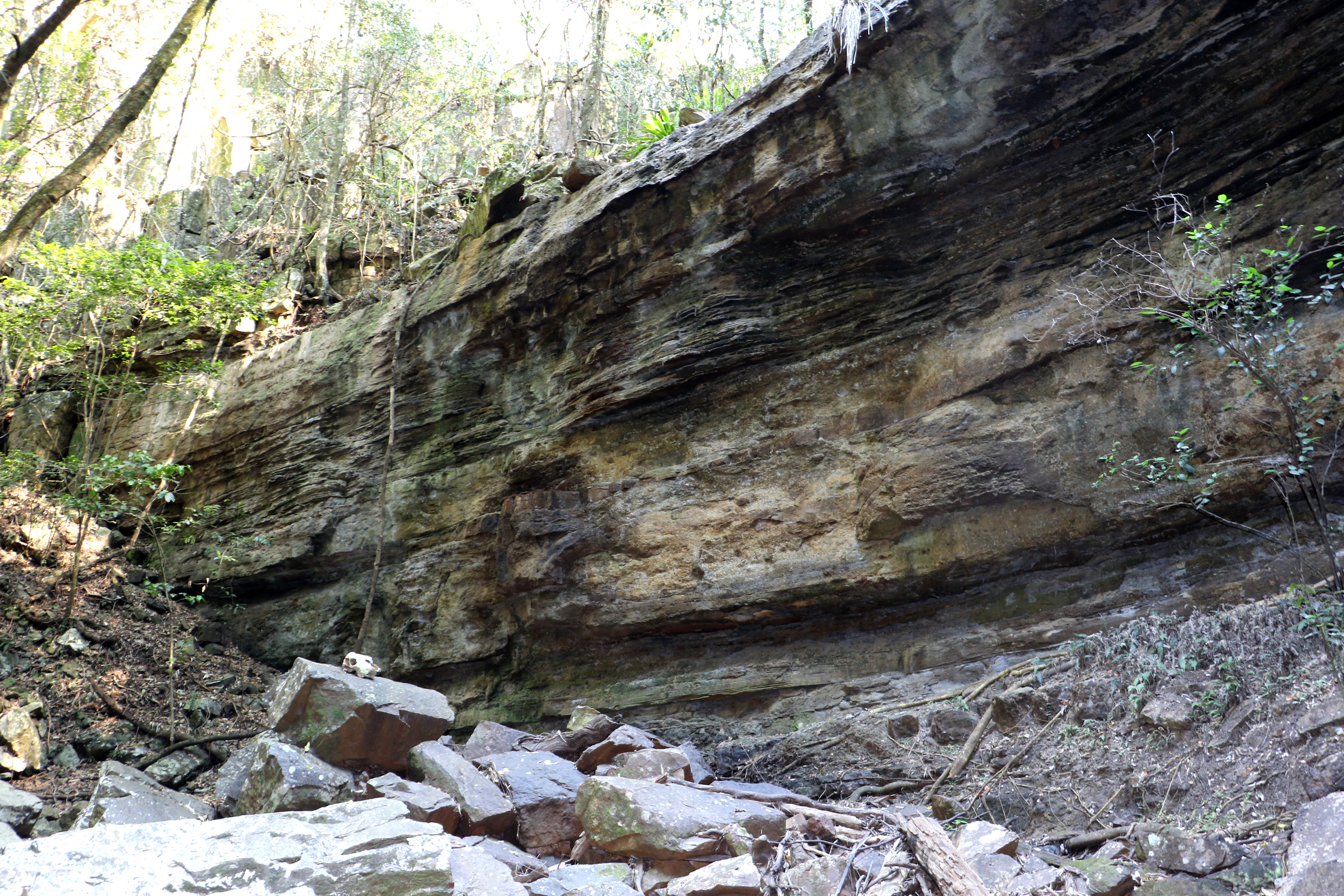
Yatteyattah Nature Reserve, Australia

The Conjola Formation is a geologic formation in the south of the Sydney Basin in eastern Australia. Formed in the late Permian, when the Wagonga Beds sank below sea level, and were subsequently covered with eroded sediments. A member of the Shoalhaven Group, the maximum depth is 550 metres, the age is between 264 and 265 million years. Within this formation the rocks contain mid to dark-grey siltstone of an indistinct bedding to flat-bedding. With very fine feldspathic lithic sandstone, and thin layers of lenses of fine-grained sandstone.

The Conjola Formation dominates the geology in areas such as Pebbly Beach in Murramarang National Park and Turmeil on the Princes Highway, where spotted gum forests occur. Milton Monzonite is an igneous intrusion through the formation.

== See also ==
- Sydney Basin
- Nowra Sandstone
- Milton Monzonite
