= Conjola Park =

- Town
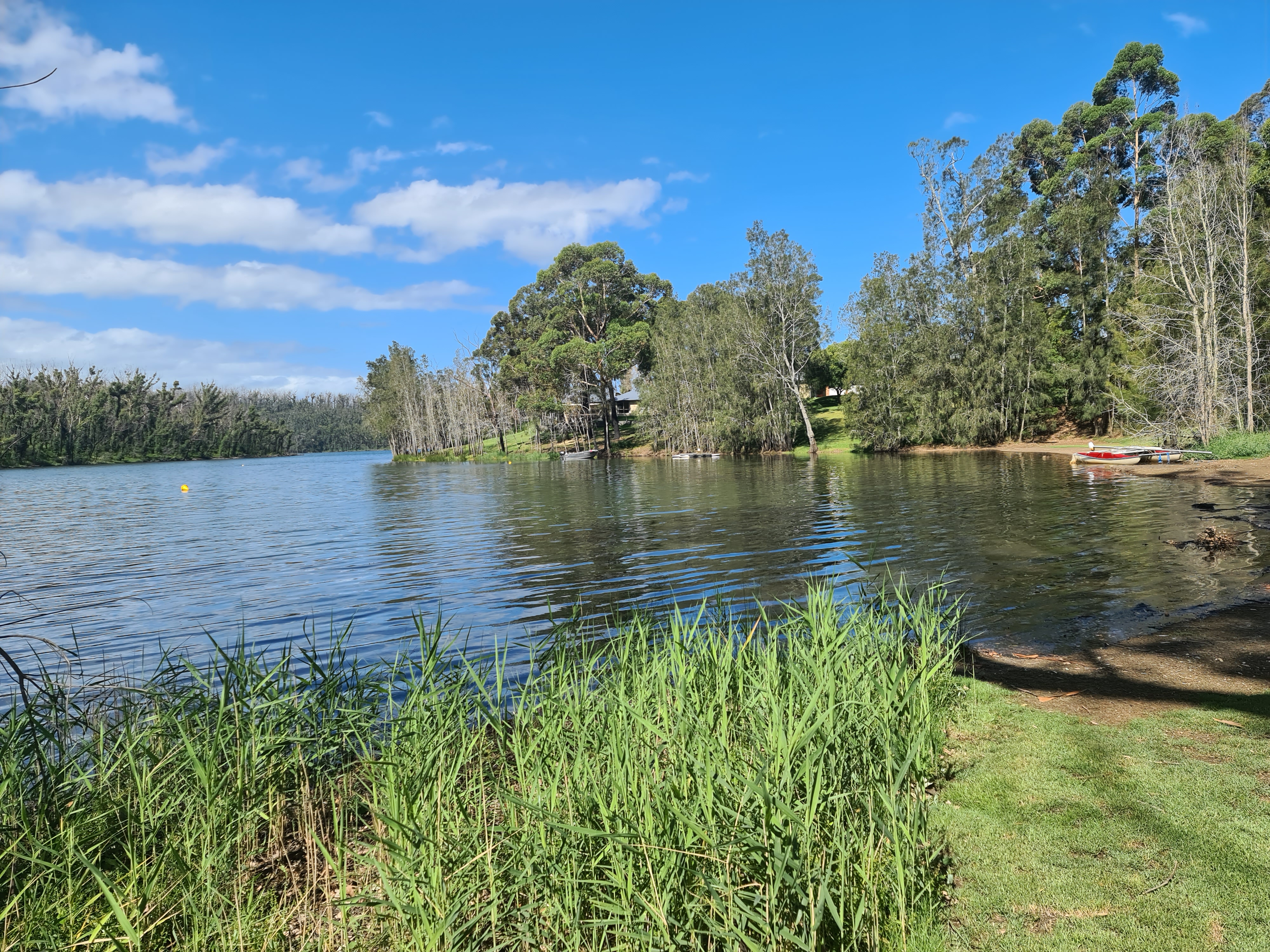
- Lake Conjola at Conjola Park

- Coordinates: 35°15′48″S 150°26′35″E
- Country: Australia
- State: New South Wales
- Region: South Coast
- LGA: City of Shoalhaven
- Location: 15 km (9.3 mi) N of Ulladulla; 215 km (134 mi) S of Sydney; 50 km (31 mi) S of Nowra

Government
  - State electorate: South Coast
  - Federal division: Gilmore
- Elevation: 28 m (92 ft)

Population
  - Total: 298 (2021 census)
- Postcode: 2539
- County: St Vincent
- Parish: Conjola
Localities around Conjola Park
Yatte Yattah	Conjola	Conjola
Yatte Yattah	Conjola Park	Lake Conjola
Yatte Yattah	Yatte Yattah	Lake Conjola

Conjola Park is a village in the City of Shoalhaven, New South Wales, Australia. It lies on the south shore of a lagoon called Conjola Lake, just to the east of the Princes Highway on Lake Conjola Entrance Road, which connects to the town of Lake Conjola. It lies about 15 km north of Ulladulla and 215 km south of Sydney. At the 2021 census, it had a population of 298.

It was badly affected by a bushfire on 31 December 2019, when 89 homes were lost.

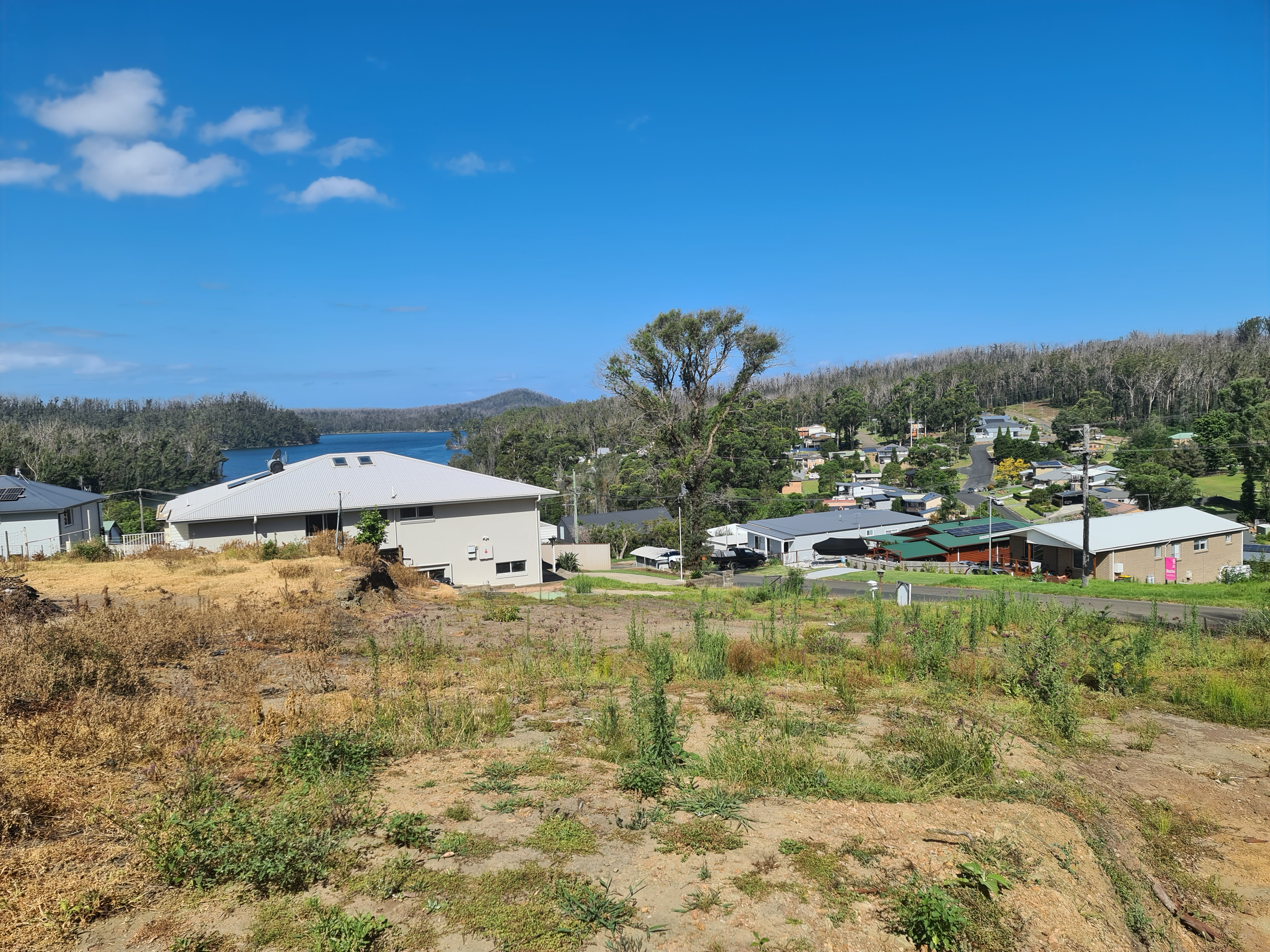
A year after the fire on New Year's Eve, 2019, many houses have been rebuilt.
