= Pterostylis hians =

Opera house greenhood

Scientific classification
- Kingdom: Plantae
- Clade: Tracheophytes
- Clade: Angiosperms
- Clade: Monocots
- Order: Asparagales
- Family: Orchidaceae
- Subfamily: Orchidoideae
- Tribe: Cranichideae
- Genus: Pterostylis
- Species: P. hians

Binomial name
- Pterostylis hians D.L.Jones

Synonyms
- Diplodium hians (D.L.Jones) D.L.Jones & M.A.Clem.

Species of orchid

Pterostylis hians, commonly known as opera house greenhood, is a species of orchid endemic to New South Wales. Non-flowering plants have a rosette of leaves flat on the ground but flowering plants have a single shiny white and green flower. This greenhood is only known from a single location near Ulladulla.

== Description ==
Pterostylis hians is a terrestrial, perennial, deciduous, herb with an underground tuber and when not flowering, a rosette of dark green, more or less round leaves, each leaf 8–12 mm (0.3–0.5 in) long and 9–13 mm (0.4–0.5 in) wide. Flowering plants have a single bright green and white flower 13–16 mm (0.5–0.6 in) long and 10–16 mm (0.4–0.6 in) wide on a stem 100–300 mm (4–10 in) tall. The dorsal sepal and petals are fused, forming a hood or "galea" over the column and the dorsal sepal has a short, sharply pointed tip. The lateral sepals are held closely against the galea, have erect thread-like tips 9–12 mm (0.4–0.5 in) long and a protruding, platform-like sinus between their bases. The labellum is about 5 mm (0.2 in) long and 3 mm (0.1 in) wide, just visible above the sinus. Flowering occurs from March to May.

== Taxonomy and naming ==
Pterostylis hians was first formally described in 1997 by David Jones from a specimen collected near Manyana and the description was published in The Orchadian. The specific epithet (hians) is a Latin word meaning "gaping" or "yawning".

== Distribution and habitat ==
Opera house greenhood grows in shrubby forest in a small area near Ulladulla.
