= Little Forest, New South Wales =

Coordinates: 35°17′31″S 150°22′38″E

Little Forest
- Suburb
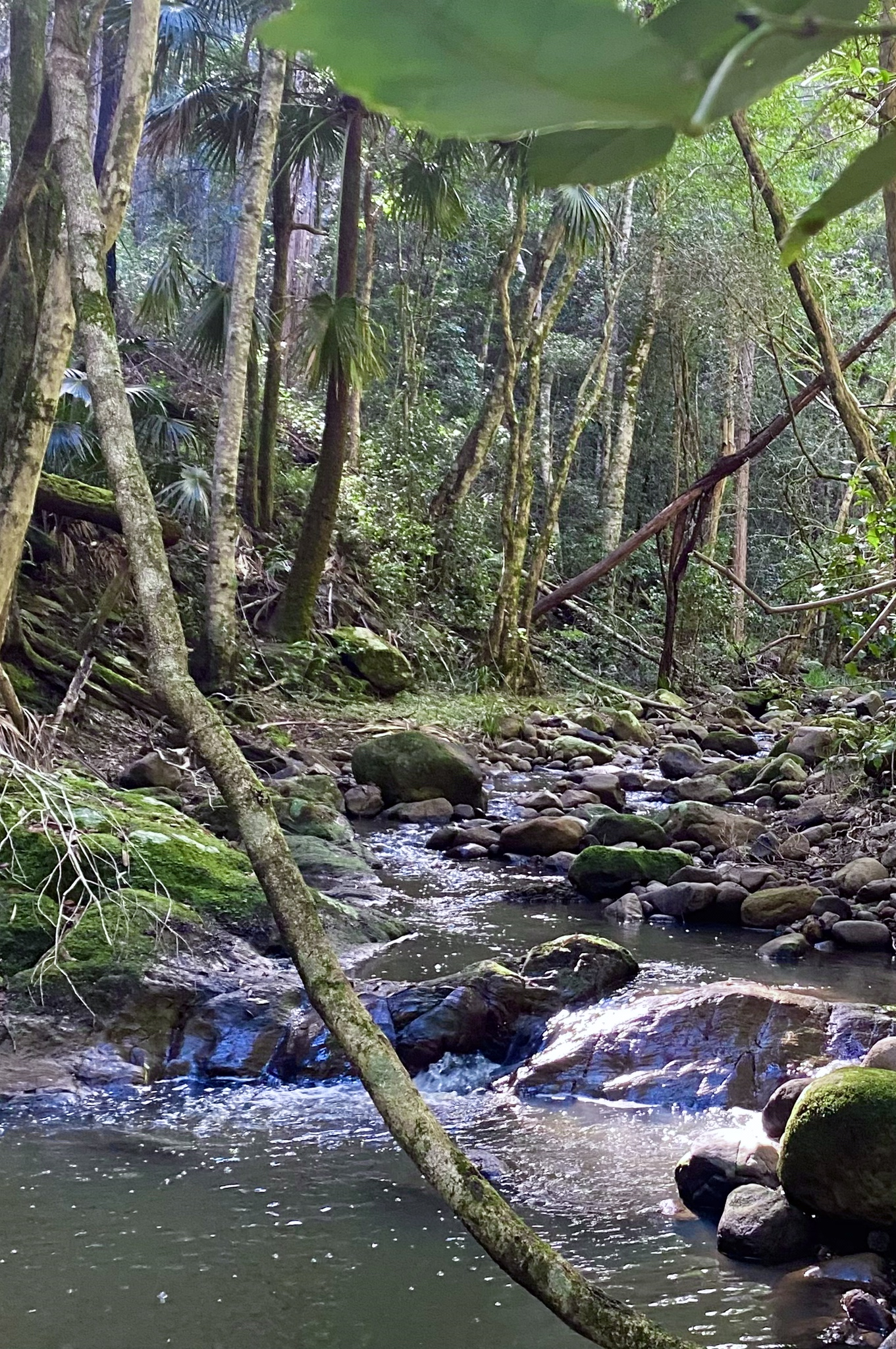
- Subtropical rainforest at Little Forest Creek, Little Forest, NSW, Australia.
- Country: Australia
- State: New South Wales
- LGA: Shoalhaven
- Location: 62 km (39 mi) S of Nowra; 16 km (9.9 mi) WNW of Ulladulla; 224 km (139 mi) SSW of Sydney
- Established: 1827

Government
  - Federal division: Gilmore
- Elevation: 96 m (315 ft)

Population
  - Total: 185 (SAL 2021)
- Postcode: 2538
Suburbs around Little Forest
Porters Creek	Pointer Mountain	Yatte Yattah
Porters Creek	Little Forest	Yatte Yattah
Endrick	Croobyar Mount Kingiman	Milton

Little Forest is a rural suburb of the City of Shoalhaven on the south coast of New South Wales, Australia. Little Forest is to the north or Milton and the west of Yatte Yattah below the escarpment of Little Forest Plateau part of Morton National Park. It lies to the west of the Princes Highway.

== History ==
Little Forest had the southern most distribution for Australian red cedar and as such the species in the area was heavily exploited in the 19th century during the "red gold" rush. The land was claimed by Thomas Kendall in 1827 as part of Kendall's original Yatte Yattah land grant. Convicts and timbergetters carted lumber from Little Forest and Yatte Yattah to Ulladulla Harbour where it was shipped to markets. By the 1900s most of the red cedar had become locally extinct and Little Forest became a cattle farming area.
