= Manyana =

- Town
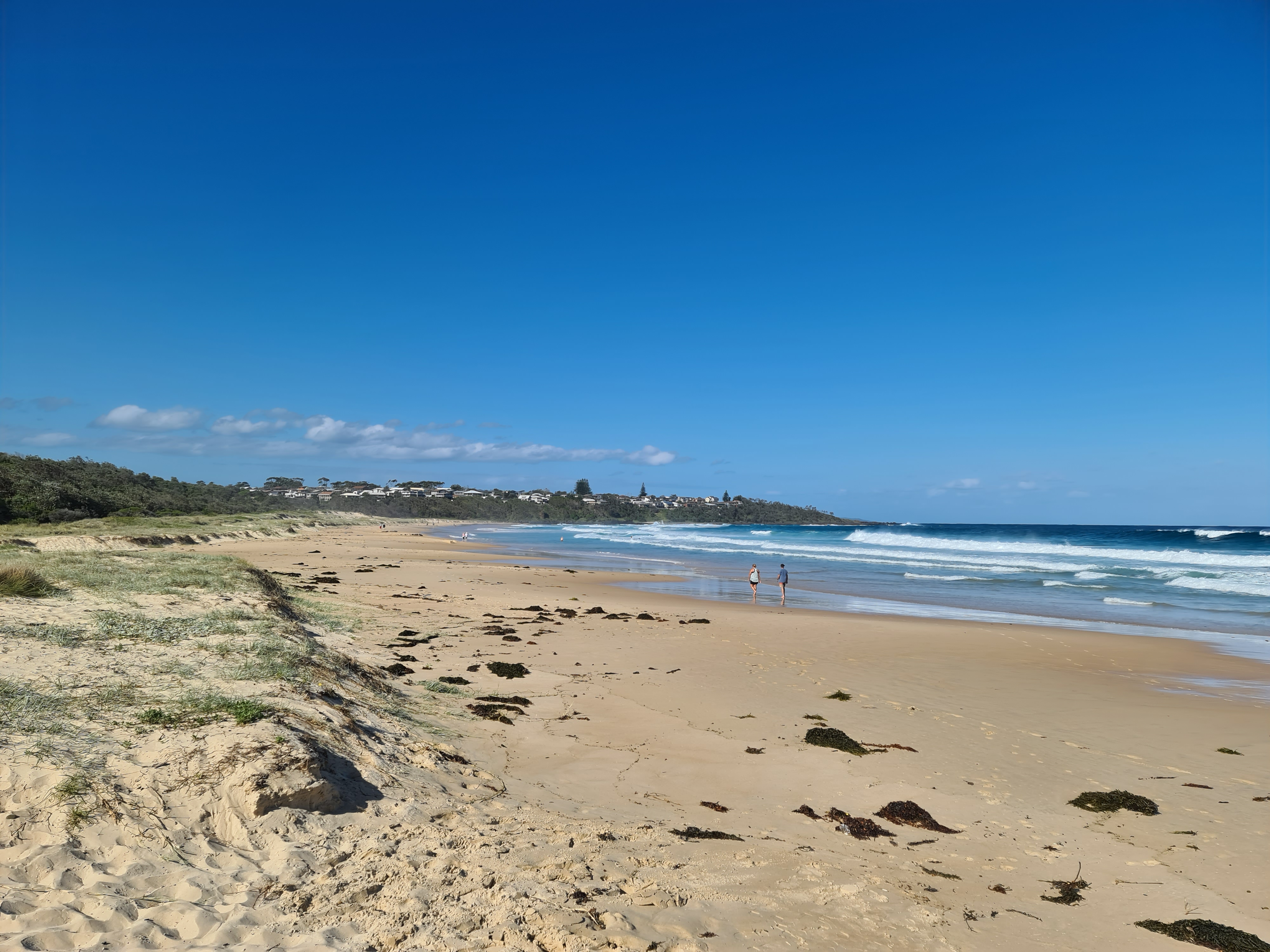
- Manyana Beach and Manyana from Cunjurong Point

- Coordinates: 35°15′S 150°31′E
- Country: Australia
- State: New South Wales
- LGA: City of Shoalhaven
- Location: 215 km (134 mi) S of Sydney; 35 km (22 mi) N of Ulladulla; 55 km (34 mi) S of Nowra

Government
  - State electorate: South Coast
  - Federal division: Gilmore
- Elevation: 14 m (46 ft)

Population
  - Total: 521 (2021 census)
- Postcode: 2539
- County: St Vincent
- Parish: Conjola
Localities around Manyana
Conjola	Bendalong
Conjola	Manyana	Tasman Sea
Lake Conjola	Cunjurong Point

Manyana is a small town on the South Coast of New South Wales, Australia in the City of Shoalhaven. At the 2016 census, it had a population of 521. Manyana is bordered by Bendalong and Cunjurong Point.

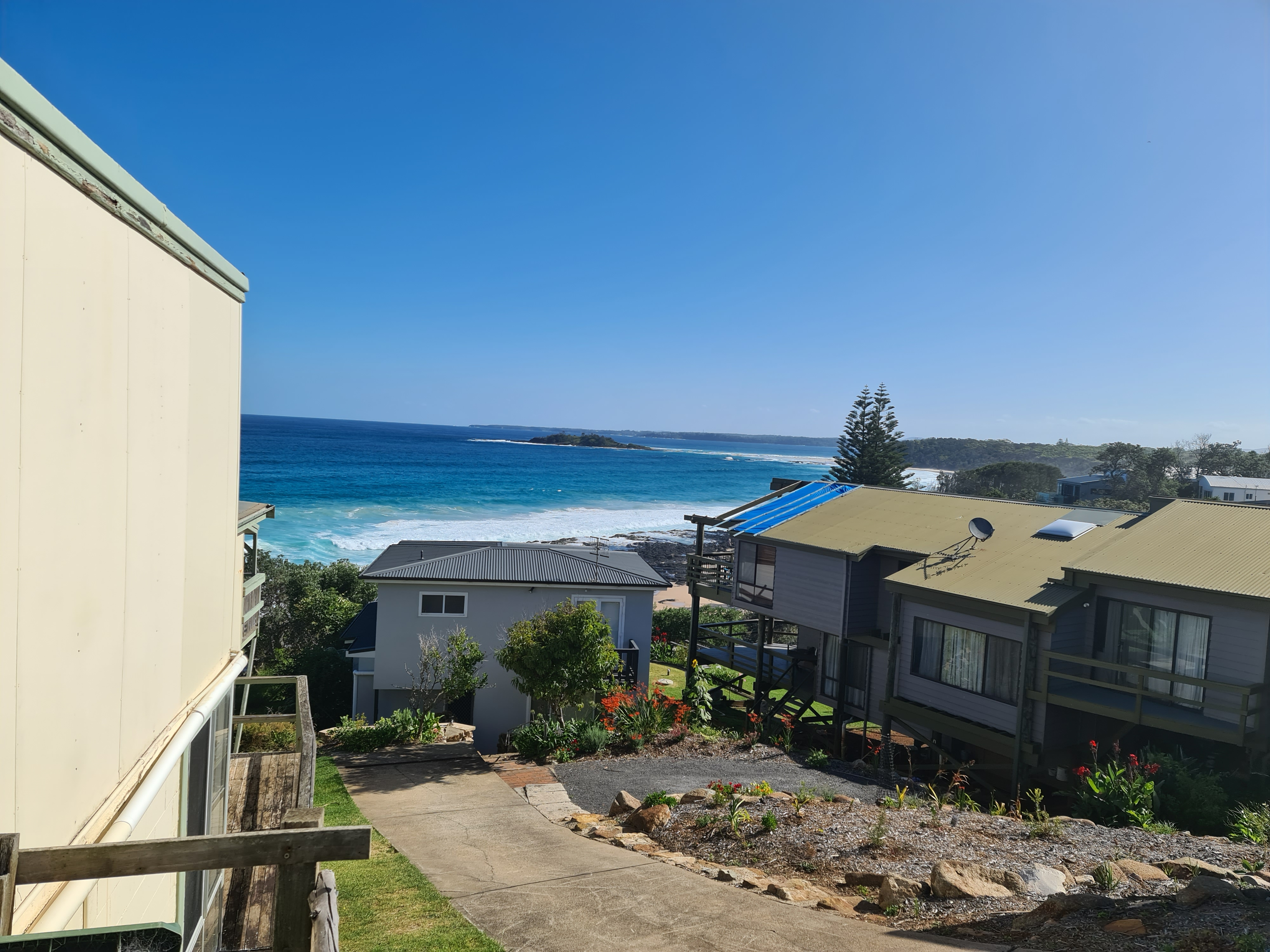
Manyana
