= Croobyar =

- Town
- Coordinates: 35°19′15″S 150°24′0″E
- Country: Australia
- State: New South Wales
- Region: South Coast
- LGA: City of Shoalhaven
- Location: 9 km (5.6 mi) NW of Ulladulla; 63 km (39 mi) S of Nowra; 223 km (139 mi) SSW of Sydney

Government
  - State electorate: South Coast
  - Federal division: Gilmore
- Elevation: 108 m (354 ft)

Population
  - Total: 174 (2021 census)
- Postcode: 2539
- County: St Vincent
- Parish: Croobyar
Localities around Croobyar
Little Forest	Little Forest	Milton
	Croobyar	Milton
	Woodstock	Milton

Croobyar is a rural suburb of the Milton-Ulladulla district within the City of Shoalhaven on the New South Wales South Coast in Australia. It is located immediately west of Milton and in 2021 the population was 174. The main industry in Croobyar is dairy farming.

== History ==
The first European settlement in Croobyar occurred in the late 1840s, when prominent local shipbuilder and future mayor of Ulladulla, David Warden purchased 2,650 square metres (28,500 sq ft) of land and between 3-400 cattle from the estate of Alexander Macleay, the former Colonial Secretary. Warden built a stone cottage and dairy by Croobyar Creek and later, the heritage listed Mount Airlie homestead at nearby Woodstock in 1868. Following Warden's death, the Croobyar estate was subdivided between his four sons. By 1881, the Warden family had built a school to educate children of farm workers, which became a hub for community activities. The school would eventually close during World War II, although the schoolmaster's cottage was preserved and remains today as a boutique guest house.

Croobyar Farm was still operating as a commercial dairy in 2022.
