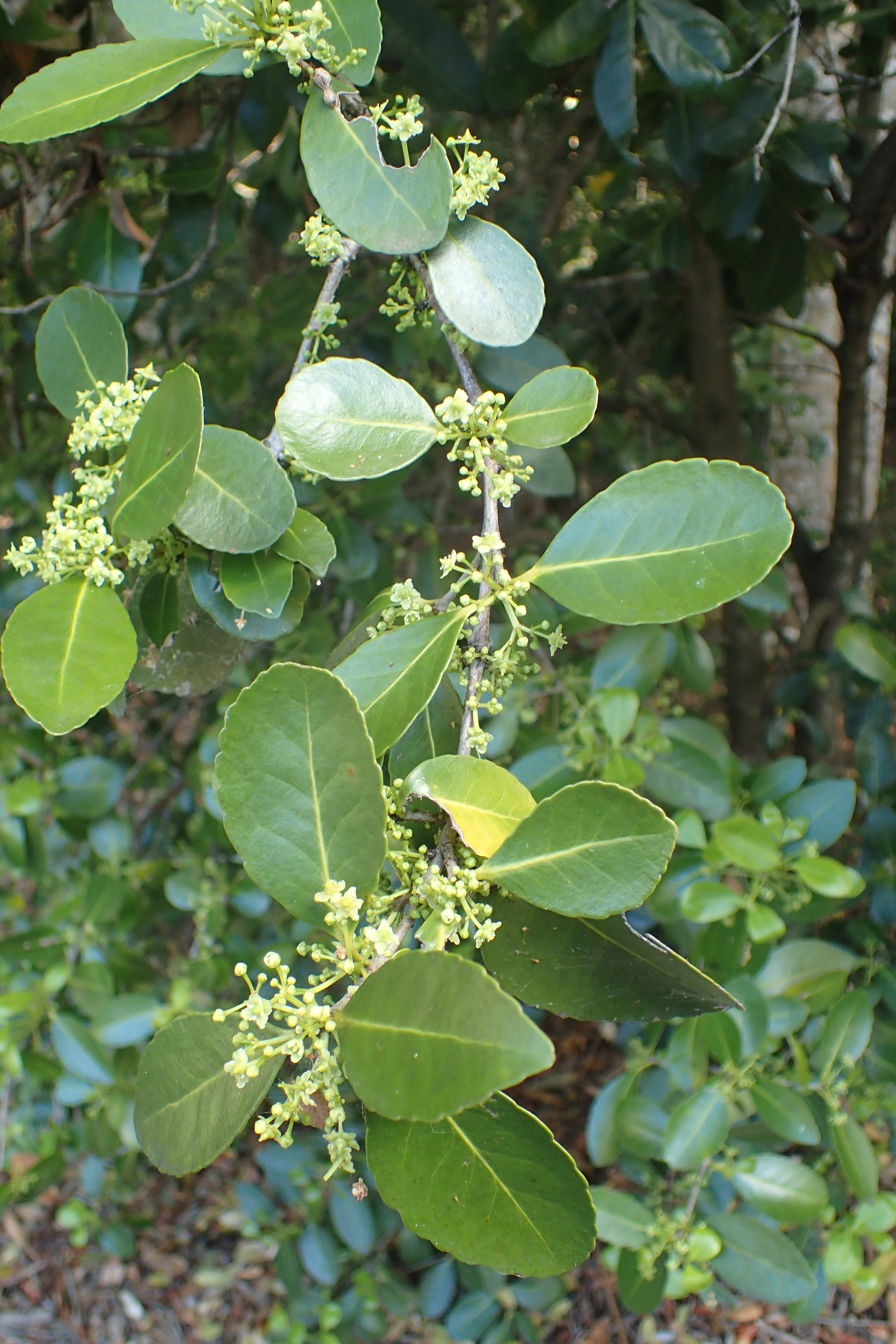
- Leaves and female flowers in Coffs Harbour Botanic Garden

Scientific classification
- Kingdom: Plantae
- Clade: Tracheophytes
- Clade: Angiosperms
- Clade: Eudicots
- Clade: Rosids
- Order: Celastrales
- Family: Celastraceae
- Genus: Elaeodendron
- Species: E. australe

Binomial name
- Elaeodendron australe Vent.

Synonyms
- Cassine australis (Vent.) Kuntze; Portenschlagia australis (Vent.) Tratt.

= Elaeodendron australe =

Red olive-berry

Species of flowering plant

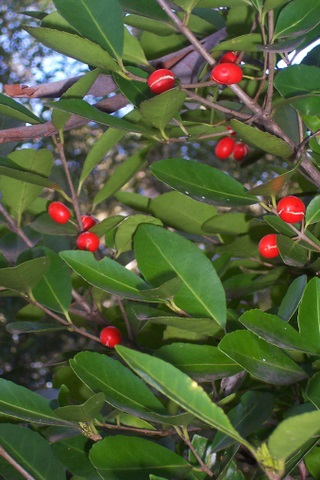
In Yatteyattah Nature Reserve

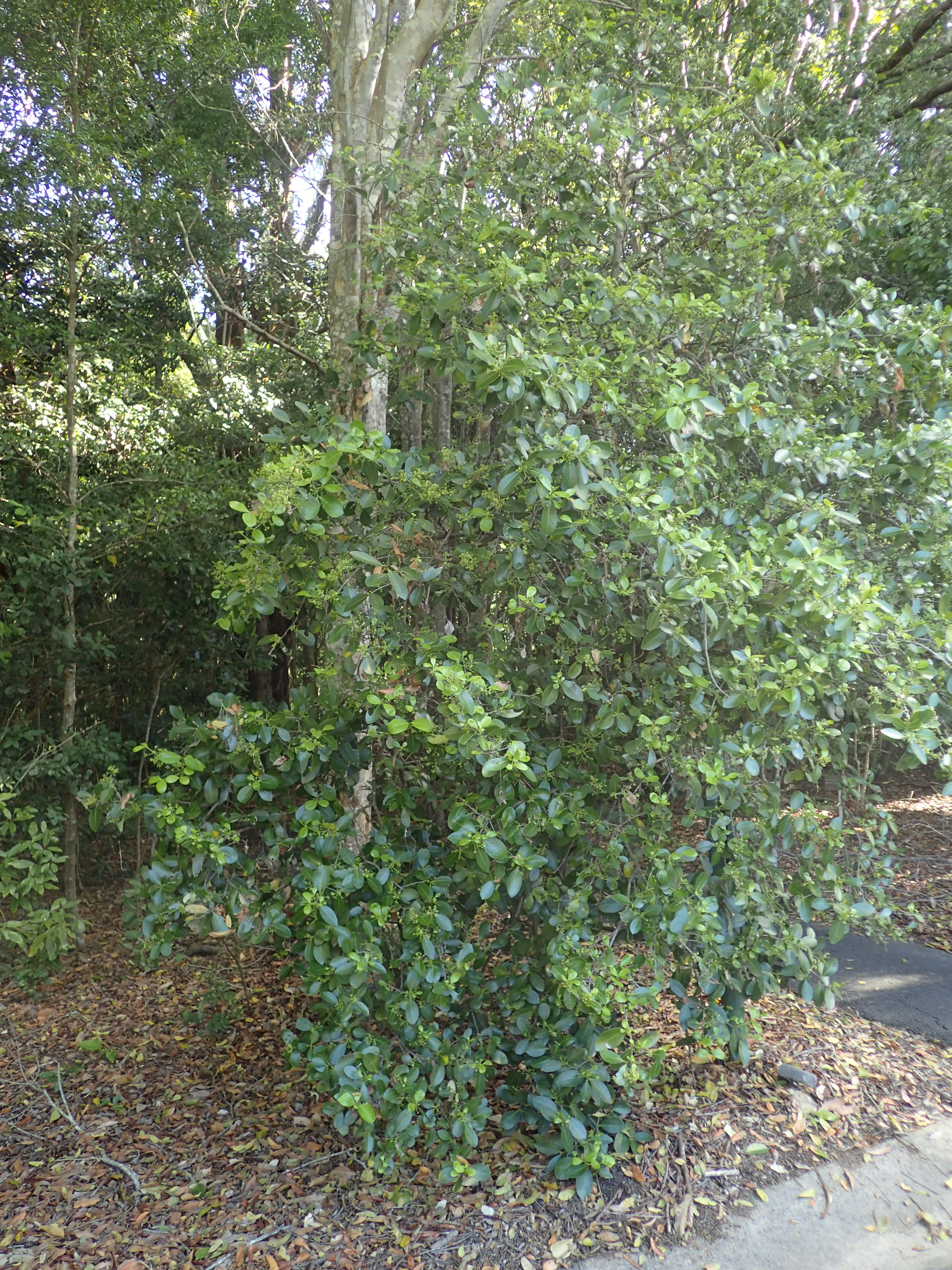
Habit in Coffs Harbour Botanic Garden

Elaeodendron australe, commonly known as red olive-berry, red-fruited olive plum, or blush boxwood, is a species of flowering plant in the family Celastraceae and is endemic to eastern Australia. It is a shrub or small tree with egg-shaped to oblong leaves with a wavy margin, yellowish green male and female flowers on separate plants and fleshy orange-red fruit.

== Description ==
Elaeodendron australe is a shrub or small tree that typically grows to a height of 8 m (26 ft) and has separate male and female plants. The leaves are mostly arranged in opposite pairs and are egg-shaped to elliptic or oblong with a wavy edge, 27–150 mm (1.1–5.9 in) long and 4–70 mm (0.16–2.76 in) wide on a petiole 4–10 mm (0.16–0.39 in) long. Elaeodendron australe is dioecious; that is, male and female flowers are borne on separate plants. The flowers are arranged in cymes in leaf axils, on a peduncle up to 12 mm (0.47 in) long, each flower on a pedicel 3–7 mm (0.12–0.28 in) long. The four petals are yellowish-green, about 4 mm (0.16 in) long. Male flowers have four stamens and female flowers have four staminodes. Flowering occurs in spring and summer and the fruit is a fleshy, oblong to oval, orange-red drupe 10–25 mm (0.39–0.98 in) long. The fruit is ripe from March to July and often persists on the tree for many months.

== Taxonomy ==
Elaeodendron australe was first formally described in 1805 by Étienne Pierre Ventenat in his book Jardin de la Malmaison.

In 1825, de Candolle described two varieties in Prodromus Systematis Naturalis Regni Vegetabilis and the names are accepted by the Australian Plant Census:

- Elaeodendron australe Vent. var. australe that has leaves less than four times as long as broad, and mostly more than 15 mm (0.59 in) wide;
- Elaeodendron australe var. integrifolium (Tratt.) DC. (previously known as Portenschlagia integrifolia) that has leaves more than four times as long as broad, and less than 15 mm (0.59 in) wide.

== Distribution and habitat ==
Red olive-berry grows in eucalypt and rainforest ecotone areas, and in littoral or dry rainforest. It is found in north-eastern and central eastern Queensland and as far south as Tuross Head in New South Wales. An unusual thick-leaved form occurs in Mount Kaputar National Park and nearby western slopes and dry tableland gorges.

== Use in horticulture ==
Seed germination is very slow, but reliable with around a 25% success rate after twelve months.
