= Cunjurong Point =

- Town
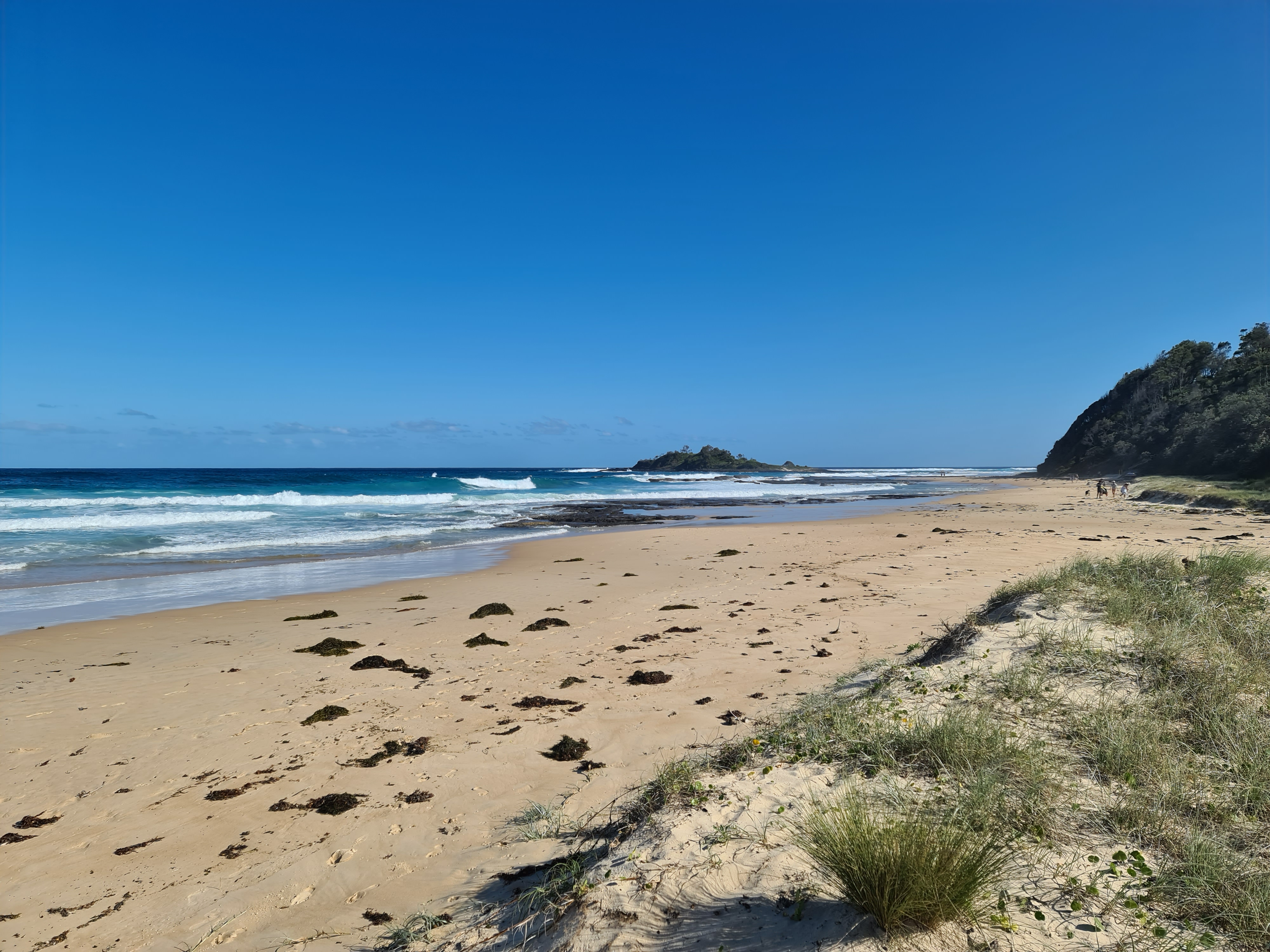
- Manyana Beach in Cunjurong Point

- Coordinates: 35°15′27″S 150°30′29″E
- Country: Australia
- State: New South Wales
- LGA: City of Shoalhaven
- Location: 215 km (134 mi) S of Sydney; 35 km (22 mi) N of Ulladulla; 55 km (34 mi) S of Nowra

Government
  - State electorate: South Coast
  - Federal division: Gilmore
- Elevation: 22 m (72 ft)

Population
  - Total: 111 (SAL 2021)
- Postcode: 2539
- County: St Vincent
- Parish: Conjola
Localities around Cunjurong Point
	Manyana	Manyana
Conjola	Cunjurong Point	Tasman Sea
Lake Conjola

Cunjurong Point is a coastal town in New South Wales, Australia in the City of Shoalhaven. At the 2016 census, it had a population of 74. Cunjurong Point borders with Manyana. Several tracks lead down from Cunjurong Point to Cunjurong Beach and Manyana Beach, including direct access to Green Island.
