= Milton Monzonite =

Geologic formation in eastern Australia

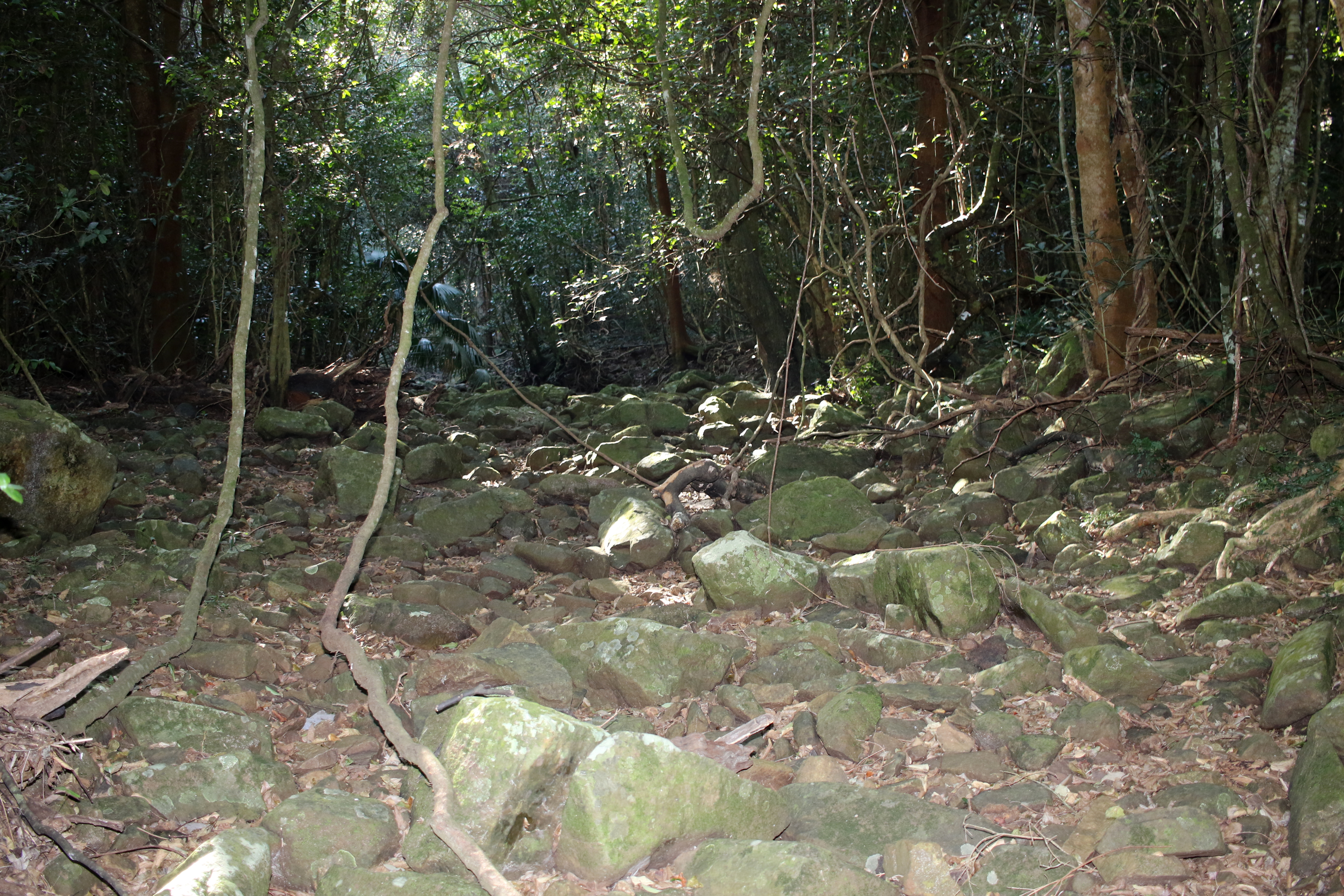
Yatteyattah Nature Reserve, Australia

Milton Monzonite is a laccolith in the Sydney Basin in eastern Australia. Formed in the early Triassic from an igneous intrusion, dated from 245 to 220 million years ago. Milton Monzonite is found in the southern coast areas of New South Wales near Milton. The soils derived from monzonite produce relatively fertile soils, and contribute to agriculture and the sub tropical rainforest at Yatteyattah, north of Milton. Surrounding and below the monzonite is the Conjola Formation, which are sedimentary rocks from the Permian.

== See also ==
- Sydney Basin
- Nowra Sandstone
