= Bendalong =

- Town
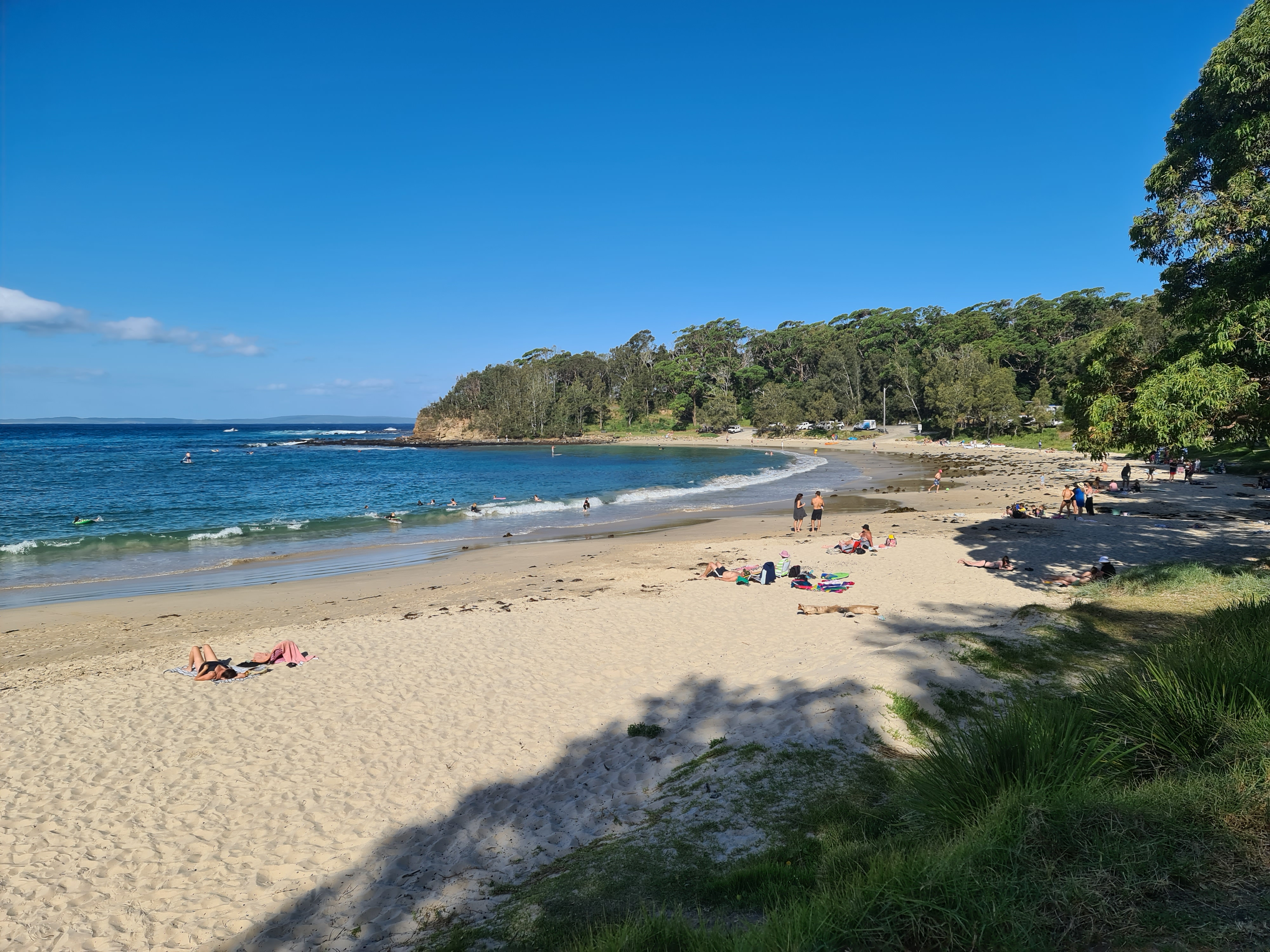
- Bendalong Beach

- Coordinates: 35°14′46″S 150°31′59″E
- Country: Australia
- State: New South Wales
- LGA: City of Shoalhaven
- Location: 210 km (130 mi) S of Sydney; 30 km (19 mi) N of Ulladulla; 50 km (31 mi) S of Nowra

Government
  - State electorate: South Coast
  - Federal division: Gilmore
- Elevation: 31 m (102 ft)

Population
  - Total: 135 (SAL 2021)
- Postcode: 2539
- County: St Vincent
- Parish: Conjola
Localities around Bendalong
	Mondayong
Conjola	Bendalong	Tasman Sea
	Manyana

Bendalong is a small town situated on the South Coast of New South Wales. It is located in the region of Ulladulla, in the City of Shoalhaven. At the 2016 census, it had a population of 95. Bendalong borders Manyana.
