= Yatteyattah Nature Reserve =

Protected area in New South Wales, Australia

- IUCN category Ia (strict nature reserve)
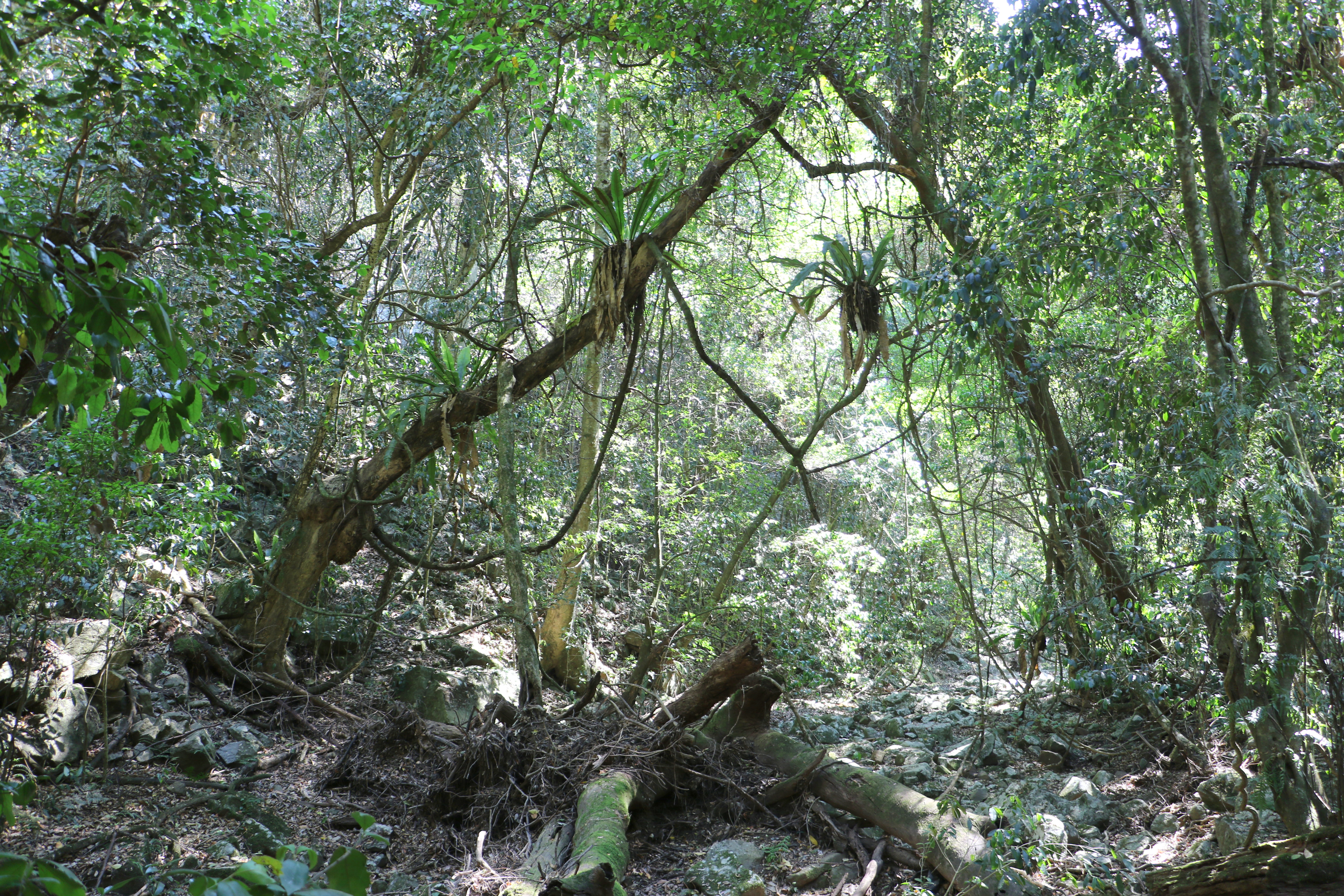
- Subtropical rainforest at Yatteyattah

- Location within New South Wales
- Location: New South Wales
- Nearest city: Milton
- Coordinates: 35°15.36′S 150°25.0571′E
- Area: 0.35 km^{2} (0.14 sq mi)
- Established: April 1996
- Governing body: NSW National Parks and Wildlife Service
- Website: Official website

The Yatteyattah Nature Reserve is a protected sub tropical rainforest in Yatte Yattah on the south coast of New South Wales, Australia. The 35-hectare (86-acre) reserve was formed from landed donated by a local farmer in the 1990s. The estimated elevation of the terrain is 546 meters.

== Features ==
The monzonite based soils, moderate climate and 1,200 millimetres (47 in) of annual rainfall produce a high quality forest red gum forest on the higher plateau. The rainforest is of scientific interest as it is the most significant southerly sub tropical rainforest remnant in Australia.

Significant tree species include red cedar, myrtle ebony, deciduous fig, citronella, silver quandong, whalebone tree and bollygum, many of which are near their southernmost limit of natural distribution. Outstanding also is the display of epiphytic ferns, such as birds nest fern and elkhorn fern.

In 1964, a broad swathe was cut through this small forest for electrical power lines, despite the area being surrounded by clear country and declared a protected area.

== Gallery ==
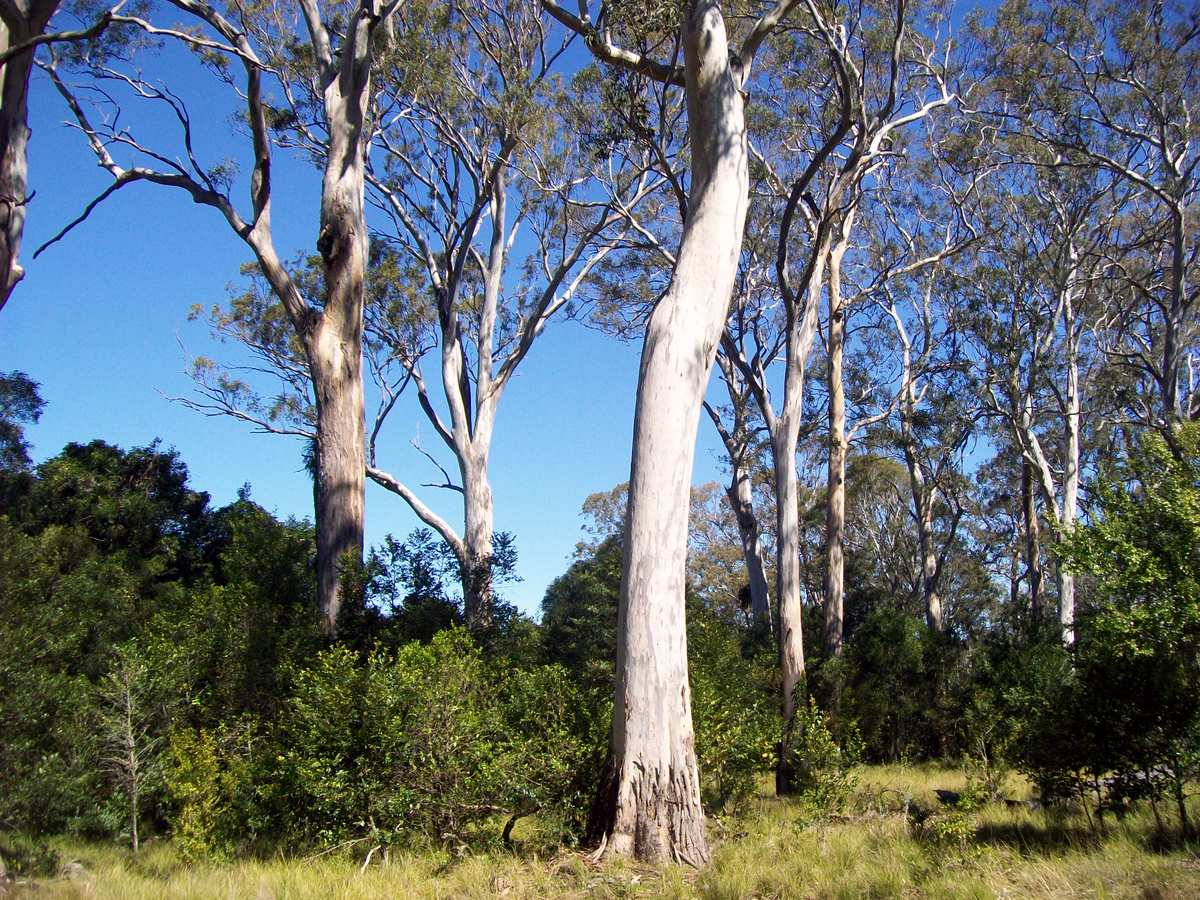
Forest red gums at Yatteyattah Nature Reserve

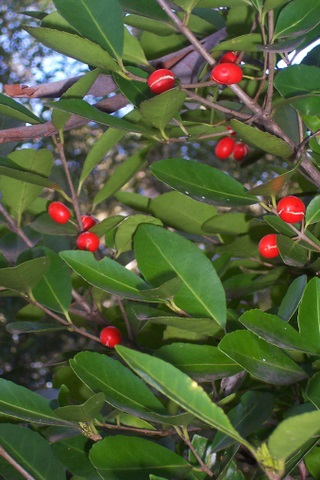
Red olive berry at Yatteyattah Nature Reserve

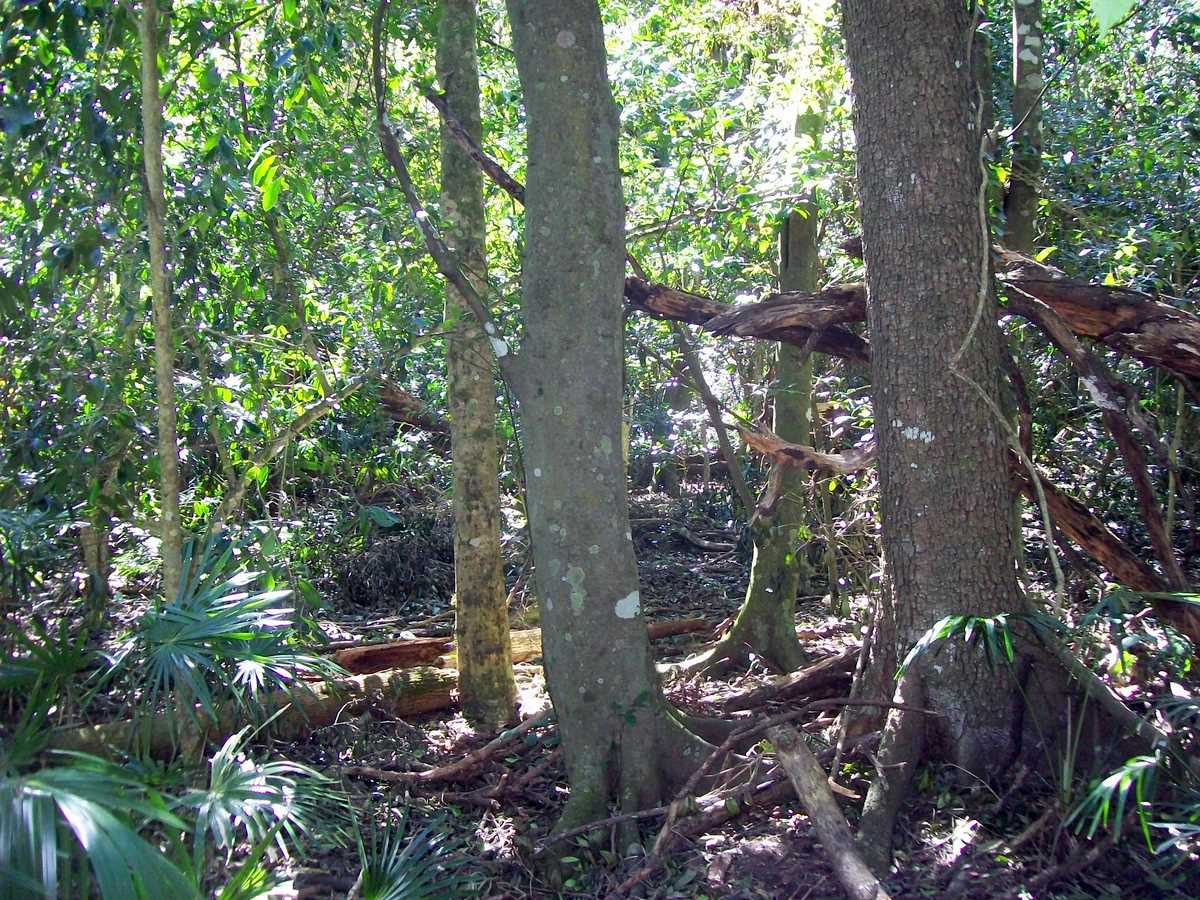
Subtropical rainforest at Yatteyattah Nature Reserve (the buttressed dark tree on right is an Australian red cedar)

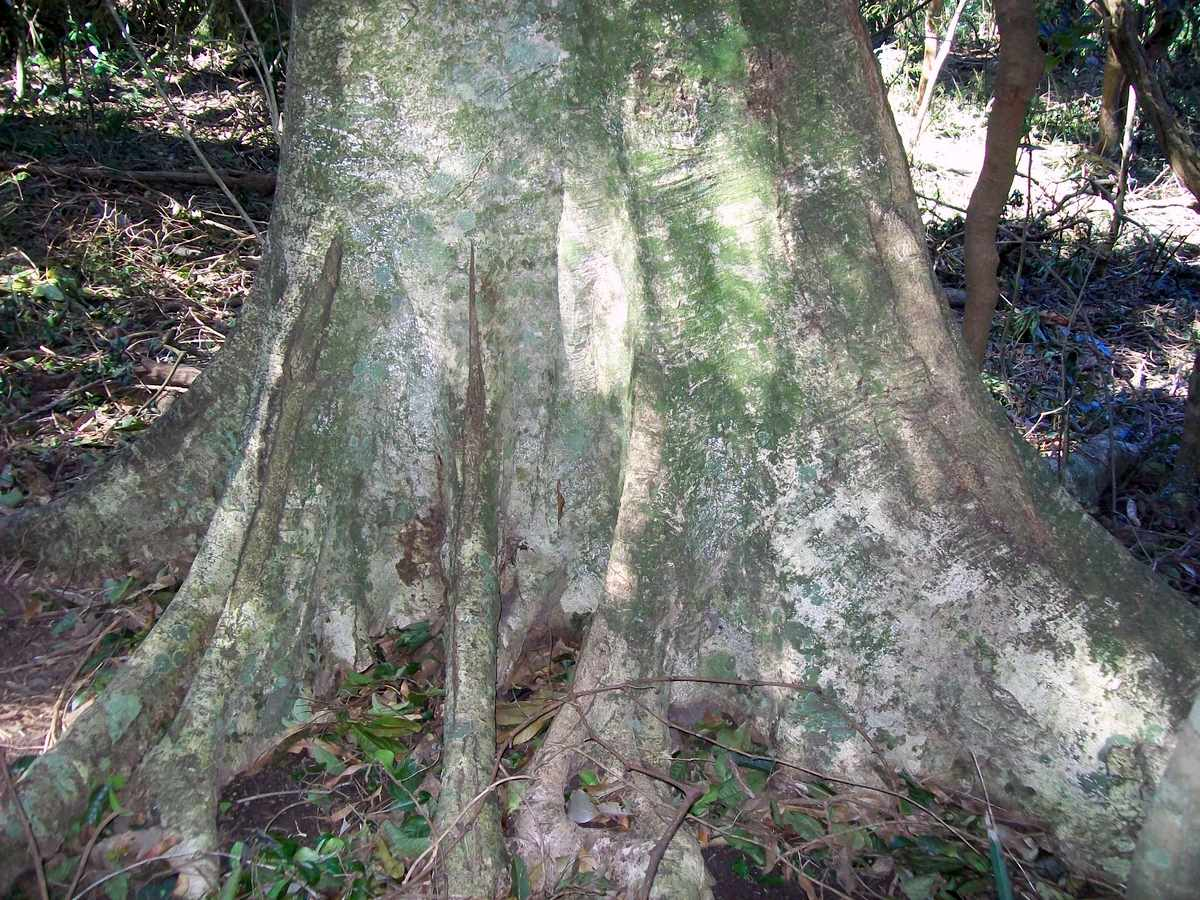
Silver quandong at its southernmost limit of natural distribution, Yatteyattah Nature Reserve

== See also ==
- Protected areas of New South Wales
