= Lake Conjola =

- Town
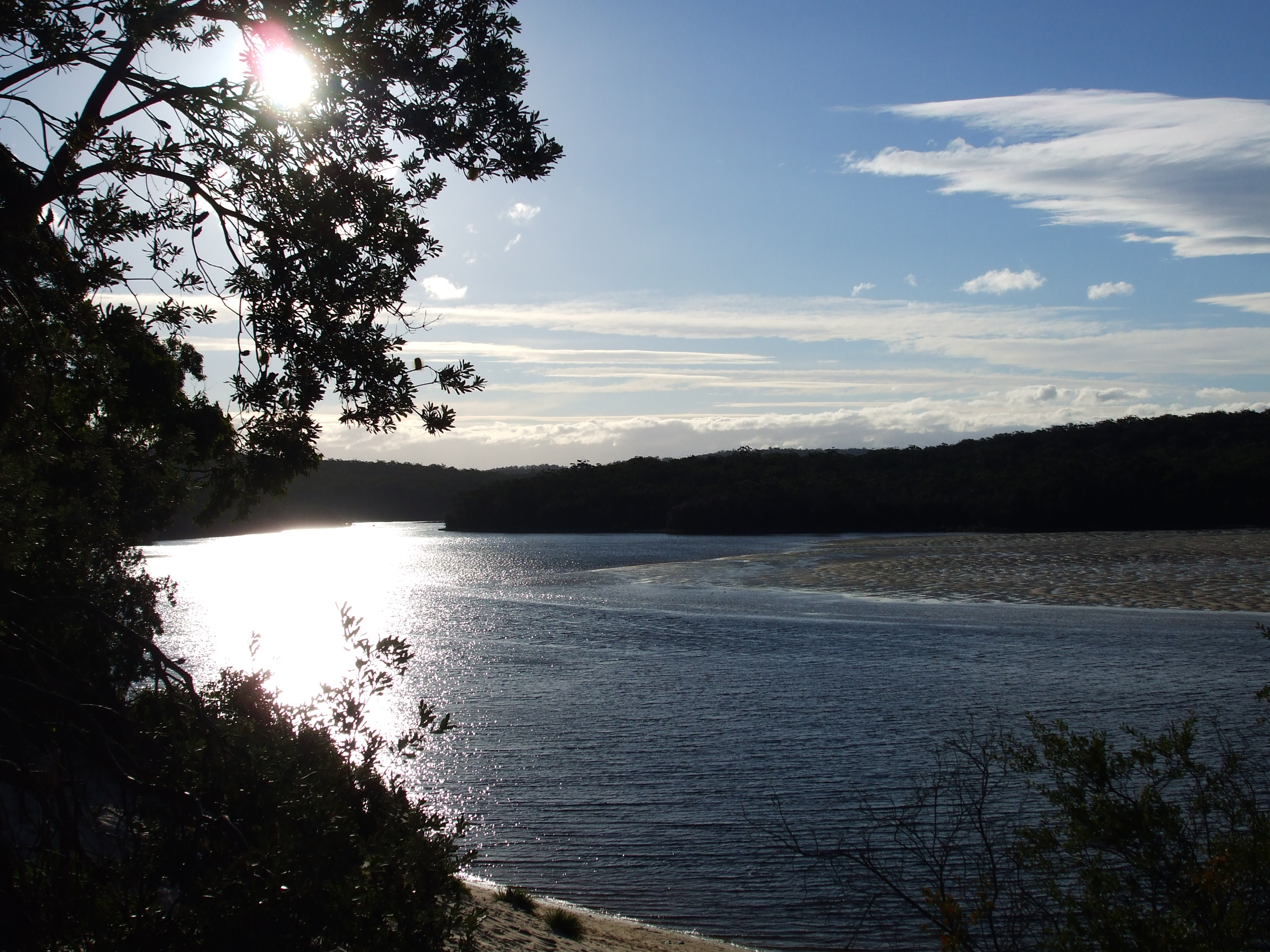
- Photo of Lake Conjola

- Coordinates: 35°16′S 150°29′E
- Country: Australia
- State: New South Wales
- Region: South Coast
- LGA: City of Shoalhaven
- Location: 19 km (12 mi) N of Ulladulla; 54 km (34 mi) S of Nowra; 219 km (136 mi) SSW of Sydney

Government
  - State electorate: South Coast
  - Federal division: Gilmore
- Elevation: 10 m (33 ft)

Population
  - Total: 687 (2021 census)
- Postcode: 2539
- County: St Vincent
- Parish: Conjola
Localities around Lake Conjola
Conjola	Conjola	Cunjurong Point
Conjola Park	Lake Conjola	Tasman Sea
Milton	Narrawallee	Tasman Sea

Lake Conjola is a small town situated on the South Coast of New South Wales, Australia. It is located in the region of Ulladulla, in the City of Shoalhaven. At the 2021 census, Lake Conjola had a population of 687. Lake Conjola is a popular tourist destination for boaters and fisherman. Fish in the lake include bream, whiting, tailor, flathead, luderick and jewfish. Lake Conjola is located on the southern side of Green Island, a renowned surf break. There are four caravan parks with cabins, caravan areas, tent areas, and waterfronts.

On New Year's Eve in 2019 the town was affected by fire during the 2019–20 Australian bushfire season. Eight-nine homes were lost in nearby Conjola Park.

== Population ==
In the 2016 Census, there were 437 people in Lake Conjola. 81.6% of people were born in Australia and 90.8% of people spoke only English at home. The most common responses for religion were Anglican 34.6% and No Religion 25.7%.

== See also ==
- Conjola National Park
