= Nowra Sandstone =

- Stratigraphic range: Late Permian
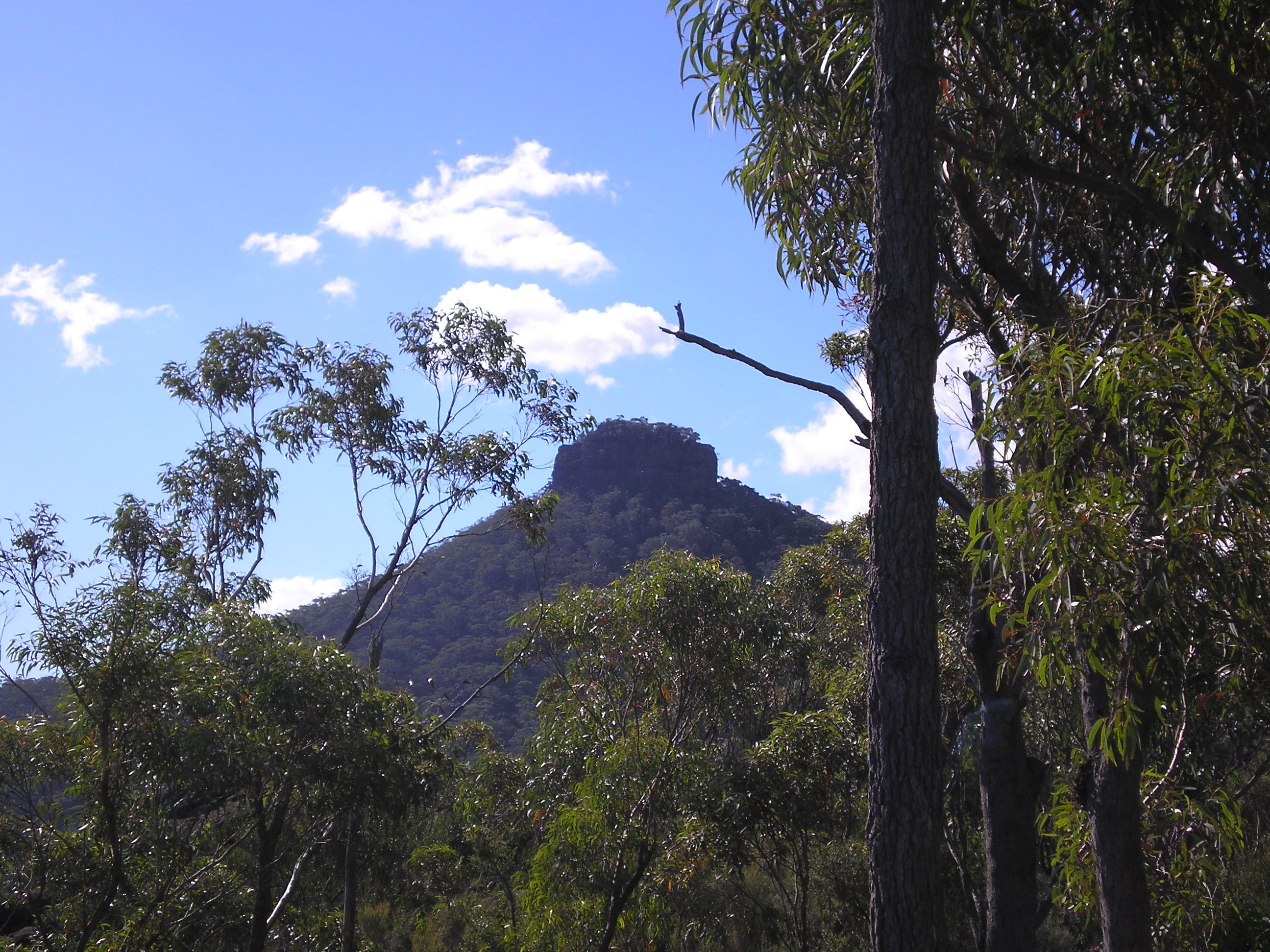
- Pigeon House Mountain, Australia
- Type: Geological formation
- Thickness: up to 90 metres (300 ft)

Lithology
- Primary: Sandstone

Location
- Country: Australia
- Extent: Sydney Basin

Nowra Sandstone occurs in the Sydney Basin in eastern Australia. Formed in the Late Permian, the rock stratum is up to 90 metres thick. The popular bushwalking areas of Pigeon House Mountain and the Budawangs feature this rock type.

== Gallery ==
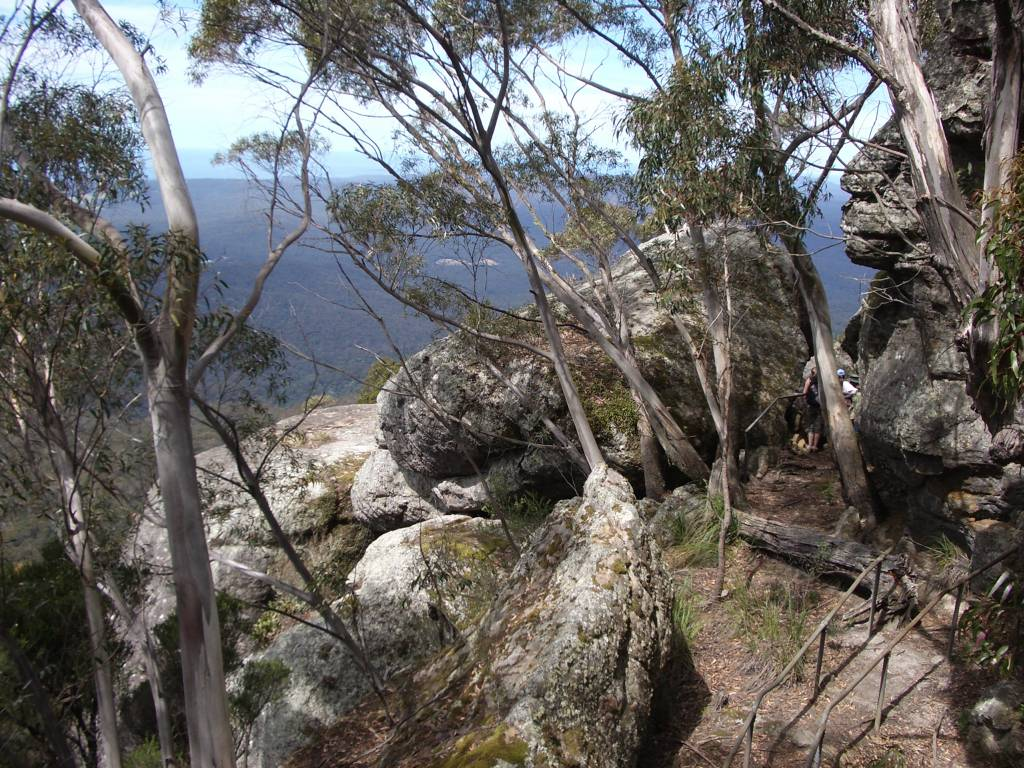
Pigeon House Mountain

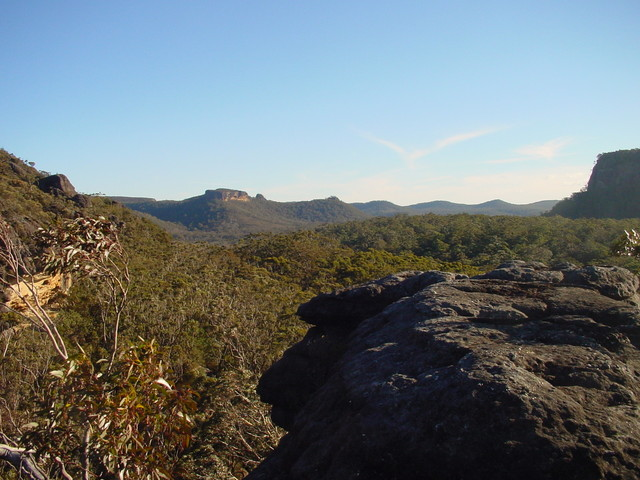
Budawang Range

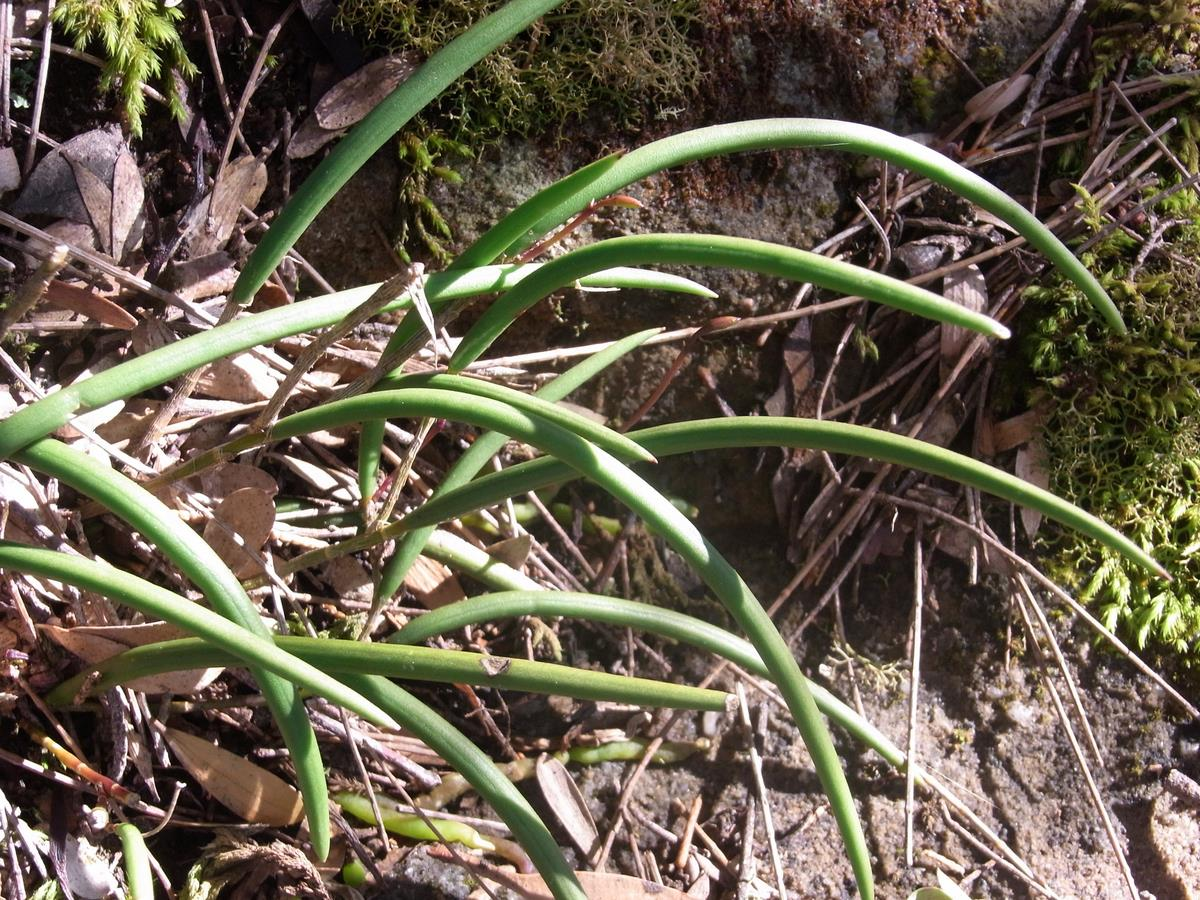
Pigeon House Mountain

== See also ==
- Sydney Basin
