= Yedikule Gasworks =

- Yedikule Gazhanesi
- Interactive map of the Yedikule Gasworks area

General information
- Status: Closed
- Type: Gasworks
- Location: Yedikule, Fatih, Istanbul, Turkey
- Coordinates: 40.99404°N 28.92334°E
- Opened: 1880
- Closed: 1993
- Owner: (1887-1888) Hasan Tahsin; (1888-1926) Ottoman Lighting Company of Istanbul; (1926-1945) Üsküdar-Kadıköy Gas Co.; (1945-1993) Istanbul Electricity, Tram and Funicular Co. (İETT)

Yedikule Gasworks (Turkish: Yedikule Gazhanesi) was a gasworks to produce coal gas in Istanbul, Turkey. It was built in 1880 and functioned until 1993.

== History ==
Yedikule Gasworks is located at Yedikule neighborhood of Fatih district in Istanbul, Turkey.

Its construction began during the Ottoman era in 1873 after the mayor of Istanbul signed a concession agreement with a French company also as the operator. The project included the building of five industrial coke furnaces, two of them in the first phase. The budgeted cost amounted to 350,000-400,000 French francs. The project dragged on for a long time, and was not completed. The construction work resumed during the first years of the reign of Sultan Abdul Hamid II (r. 1876–1909), and was completed in 1880. It was decided that the Municapity of Istanbul would take over the operation.

It was the first gasworks in Istanbul, which produced coal gas used primarily for the lighting of streets and residences. In the beginning, the coal gas was sufficient only for 400 street lamps. Later, the street lighting was extended to the neighboring districts of Eyüp, Makriköy and San Stefano.

The municipality handed over the operation concession for a period of 40 years to the merchant Hasan Tahsin on 25 August 1887. The contract included the operation of lighting 500 street lamps paid and 200 lamps free of charge. On 19 June 1888, the operation rights were transferred to İstanbul Şirket-i Tenviriye-i Osmaniye (Ottoman Lighting Company of Istanbul), which Hasan Tahsin was a partner of. The concession ended in 1926 when the Üsküdar-Kadıköy Gaz Şirketi (Üsküdar-Kadıköy Gas Co.), which operated the Hasanpaşa Gasworks on the Anatolian part of Istanbul, purchased. From 1945 on, the gasworks served under the roof of the company Istanbul Elektrik, Tramvay ve Tüne Şirketi, IETT (Istanbul Electricity, Tram and Funicular Co.).

The operation of Yedikule Gasworks ceased in 1993, along with other gasworks in Istanbul, due to the decrease in gas demand after natural gas came into use. In the time after its closing, the equipment of the gasworks, except the gas holder, was dismanteled. Its ground became a wrecking yard for the out-of-service vehicles of the İETT.

== Redevelopment project ==
Yedikule Gasworks has undergone restoration works within a redevelopment project run by the Metropolitan Municipality of Istanbul, similar of the Hasanpaşa Gasworks. It was announced that a part of the gasworks would be opened to the public before the end of 2022.

== See also ==
- Hasanpaşa Gasworks (1892-1993), a historic gasworks in Kadıköy district of Istanbul, Turkey; today a museum
- Kuzguncuk Gasworks (1865-1992), a historic gasworks in Üsküdar district of Istanbul, Turkey
