= Kuzguncuk Gasworks =

- Kuzguncuk Gazhanesi
- Former names: Beylerbeyi Palace Gasworks

General information
- Status: Closed, redeveloped
- Type: Gasworks
- Location: Kuzguncuk, Üsküdar, Istanbul, Turkey
- Coordinates: 41.0361°N 29.0350°E
- Opened: 1864
- Closed: 1940
- Owner: (1892-1926) Üsküdar-kadıköy Gas Lighting Co.; (1926-1938) Istanbul Gas and Electricity Industrial Enterprise Turkish Inc. Co.

Kuzguncuk Gasworks, also known as Beylerbeyi Palace Gasworks, (Turkish: Kuzguncuk Gazhanesi or Beylerbeyi Sarayı Gazhanesi) was a gasworks to produce coal gas in Istanbul, Turkey. It was built in 1864, and functioned until 1940. After 1992, it was redeveloped as a cultural and social facility.

== History ==
Kuzguncuk Gasworks, also known as Beylerbeyi Palace Gasworks, is located at Kuzguncuk neighborhood of Üsküdar district on the Anatolian part of Istanbul, Turkey.

The gasworks was built in 1865 during the Ottoman Empire to meet the need of coal gas to illuminate and heat the Beylerbeyi Palace in first instance, and to supply street lighting. The construction of the gasworks on an area of 10 daa (10,000 m^{2}) at the shore of Bosporus began in 1862. Carried out by a French company, it was completed in 1864. Coal was brought by colliers. The street lighting on the Anatolian part of Istanbul became the first, and in Istanbul the second after it was introduced in Pera on the European part in 1856. With the establishment of Hasanpaşa Gasworks in Kadıköy, it was taken over by the company "Üsküdar-Kadıköy Gaz Şirket-i Tenviriyesi" ("Üsküdar-Kadıköy Gas Lighting Co.") in 1892. It gradually lost its function as its technology became obsolete, and electricity arrived in the Anatolian part for street lighting in the 1920s.

The gas production stopped in 1940. Machinery and metal equipment of the gasworks were dismanteled and transported for use at the Hasanpaşa Gasworks in Kadıköy. The main and auxiliary building as well as the gas holder were declared a "first grade historical work" as part of the Beylerbeyi Palace. According to the locals, the gasworks yard was used as a mushroom farm a long period after some time of closing. It is surprising that a pig farm operated there, although pork is not consumed in Turkey. The property remained derelict, and existed as a national real estate only in documents until 1992. It was even not shown in the master plans of the municipality.

== Redevelopment project ==
In 1992, "Mülkiyeliler Birliği İstanbul Şubesi" ("Istanbul Branch of the Civil Servants Union") leased the property from the National real Estate Administration for a period of 49 years. 29 shacks in the property were vacated and demolished one by one. A redevelopment project was started using the original architectural plans of the gasworks. The restoration of the property consisting of three buildings with a total area of 2,500 m^{2} (27,000 sq ft) was worked out by architect Gökhan Avcıoğlu. The restoration project was influenced by the reuse of the Vienna Gasworks in Austria while it was being carried out. After four years of the approval process by the Cultural and Natural Heritage Preservation Board of the Bosporus Zoning Directorate and District Municipality of Üsküdar, the construction works began. The Ministry of Culture and Tourism supported the project.

The ruined walls of the gasworks were restored by stone masonry. The gas holder was restored in its original form, however, with steel and glass in with up-to-date technology. The buildings are used as a culturaland social center of the Istanbul Branch of the Civil Servants Union. There are a conference hall, exhibition and seminar halls, a library in the buildings, and sports and recreation sections in the open area. The gas holder serves a cafeteria and restaurant. In May 1998, the facility was taken under the auspices of the State Presidency.
