= Maspeth Gas Holders =

Buildings in Brooklyn, New York City

Maspeth Avenue Holders
- Interactive map of the Maspeth Avenue Holders area

General information
- Location: Greenpoint, Brooklyn, New York City
- Coordinates: 40°43′7″N 73°56′2″W
- Completed: Gas Holder No. 1: 1927; Gas Holder No. 2: 1948
- Demolished: July 15, 2001
- Owner: KeySpan

Height
- Height: 400 ft (121.92 m)

Design and construction
- Main contractor: Brooklyn Union Gas

Maspeth Avenue Holders (Also known as Greenpoint Gas Holders, Keyspan Gas Holders or Brooklyn Union Gas Holders) were a pair of 400-foot tall twin natural gas holders located on Maspeth Avenue in the Greenpoint neighborhood of Brooklyn, New York City. They were the tallest of their kind when constructed, until their demolition in 2001.

== History ==
The gas holders were built by Brooklyn Union Gas, the first of them, Maspeth Gas Holder No. 1 was constructed in 1927, followed by its twin, Maspeth Gas Holder No. 2, which was constructed in 1948. The top portions of both structures had a red and white checkered paint-scheme as instructed by the FAA to prevent airplane collisions.

Both gas holders fell into disuse by the 1990s respectively, as Maspeth Gas Holder No. 1 decommissioned in 1992, and Maspeth Gas Holder No. 2 decommissioned in 1997.

== Demolition ==
In April 2001, KeySpan received a permit to implode the tanks from the city of Department of Buildings. In June 2001, company officials announced the demolition plans at a community board meeting, and met with neighborhood groups on July 11, to inform them as to what precautions were being taken to prevent lead dust in the surrounding area.

On July 15, 2001, at 7:00 am, the two gas holders were both imploded with 750 pounds of explosives, by main contractor Mercer Wrecking Recycling Corp. of Trenton, New Jersey and subcontractor Controlled Demolition, Inc.
