= Dry-seal Wiggins gasholder =

A dry-seal Wiggins gasholder is a device designed to hold gas. Designed by John Wiggins in 1936, it was first manufactured in 1940 and achieved widespread use across the USA.

== Dry-seal Wiggins type gasholder ==
A dry-seal gasholder can be designed to have a gross (geometric) volume ranging from 200 to 165,000 m^{3} (7,100 to 5,826,900 cu ft), whilst having a working pressure range between 15 and 150 millibars (1.5 and 15.0 kPa). The dry-seal gasholder is finished with an anti-corrosive treatment to counteract local climatic conditions and also any chemical attack from the stored medium. This anti-corrosive treatment is fully compatible with the sealing membrane and also the environment.

=== Foundation ===
A concrete and hardcore base designed to withstand the weight of the steel gasholder structure constructed upon it and to withstand dynamic climatic conditions acting upon the gasholder etc.

=== Main tank ===
The main tank is designed to accommodate the design requirements laid down by the customer and climatic conditions. There are three main sub-elements to the tank:

Tank bottom
The tank bottom forms a gas tight seal against the foundation and is "coned up" to facilitate drainage to the periphery. The bottom is covered with steel plates. The outer annular plates are butt welded against backing strips, whilst the infill plates are lap welded on the top side only. Welded to the bottom infill plates is the:

Piston support structure
When the piston is depressurised it rests on a steel framework which is welded to the bottom plates.

Tank shell
The shell of the tank is designed to accommodate the imposed loads and the general data supplied by the client. The shell is of butt-welded design and is gas tight for approximately 40% of its lower vertical height (known as the gas space) at which point the seal angle is located. The remaining upper 60% (known as the air space) of the shell has in it various apertures for access and ventilation. Attached to the shell are various accessories:

Staircase tower
For external access to the roof of the gasholder and also incorporates access to the inside of the gasholder via the shell access doors. A locked safety gate is usually located at the base of the staircase to prevent any unauthorised access to the gasholder.

Shell access doors
Doors located at pertinent points allowing access into the gasholder from the external staircase tower.

Shell vents
Allow air to be displaced from the inside of the gasholder as the piston rises.

Inlet nozzle
The connection nozzle allowing the stored gas to enter the gasholder from the supply gas main.

Outlet nozzle
For the export of the stored gas, this nozzle comes complete with an anti-vacuum grid to protect the sealing membrane during depressurisation. Depending on the operational process the inlet and outlet nozzles maybe a shared connection.

Shell drains
Allow condensates within the gasholder gas space to drain away in seal pots. The seal pots are designed to maintain the pressure with the gasholder.

Shell manways
Used for maintenance access into the gas space – only used whilst the gasholder is out of service.

Earthing bosses
To ensure that the gasholder is safe during electrical storms etc.

Volume relief pipes
Essential fail-safe system to protect the gasholder from over-pressurisation. Once actuated, by the piston fender, the volume relief valves allow the stored gas to escape to atmosphere at a safe height above the gasholder roof. As the volume relief valves open they actuate a limit switch.

Volume relief limit switches
Used to send signals to the control room to confirm the status of the volume relief valves.

Level weight system
A mechanical counter balance system to ensure that the pistons moments are kept in equilibrium. The level weights, which run up and down tracks located on the gasholder shell, also actuate limit switches to signal when the gasholder volume has reached pre-defined settings.

Level weight limit switches
Used to send signals to the control room to operate import and export valves etc.

Contents scale
On the gasholder shell is a painted scale displaying the volume of gas stored within the gasholder. An arrow painted on an adjacent level weight indicates the current status. Also painted on the scale is the location of the piston in relation to the shell access doors.

Seal angle
Welded to the inside of the shell this angular section is where the sealing membrane attaches to the shell.

Tank roof
The roof is designed to withstand the local climatic conditions and the possibilities of additional loads, such as snow and dust. The roof of the gasholder is of thrust rafter radial construction and has a covering of single sided lap welded steel plates. The roof has various accessories attached including:

Centre vent
Allows air to enter and exit the gasholder as the storage volume changes.

Roof vents
Small nozzle around the periphery used for the installation of the seal.

Roof manways
Allows access down to the piston fender when the gasholder is full.

Circumferential handrailing
Safety handrailing around the outside of the roof.

Radial walkway
For access from the staircase to the centre vent etc.

Volume relief valve actuators
Mechanical arms that operate the volume relief valves once the piston fender reaches a certain level.

Level weight pulley structures
Steel structures mounting the level weight rope pulleys and rope separators.

Load cell nozzles
For maintenance access to the load cell instrumentation used for volume recording purposes.

Radar nozzles
For maintenance access to the radar instrumentation used for volume recording purposes and piston level readings.

Roof interior lighting nozzles
For maintenance access to the gasholders interior lights.

=== Piston ===
The gasholder piston moves up and down the inside of the shell as gas enters and exits the gasholder. The weight of the piston (less the weight of the level weights) produces the pressure at which the gasholder will operate. The piston is designed to apply an equally distributed weight to ensure that the piston remains level at all times. The piston made up of the following sub-elements:

Piston deck
The outer annular area is formed from butt welded steel plates resting on steel section rest blocks. Lap welded steel infill plates form a dome profile to withstand the gas pressure in the gas space beneath it. For higher pressure gasholders the infill plates are lap welded on both sides, whereas, low pressure gasholders are only welded on the top side. The fully welded piston deck forms a gas tight surface, which rests on the piston support structure when the gasholder is depressurised. The following ancillary items can be found on the piston deck:

Piston manway
Used for maintenance access below the piston into the gas space – only used whilst the gasholder is out of service.

Load cell chain receptacle
A receptacle for gathering up the load cell chains as the piston rises.

Piston seal angle
Welded to the outer top side of the annular plates, this angular section is where the sealing membrane attaches to the piston.

Level weight rope anchors
Equally spaced around the periphery of the piston deck are the connections to which the level weight ropes are fixed.

Piston fender
The fender is a steel frame structure that is fixed to the piston deck annular plates and acts as a support structure for the abutment plates. Access can be gained to the top of the piston fender from either the shell access doors or roof manways depending on the gasholder volume. Attached to the piston fender are the following items:

Piston walkway
A platform around the top of the piston fender equipped with safety handrailing, used for inspection purposes.

Piston ladders
Rung ladders complete with safety loops for access to the piston deck from the piston walkway.

Radar reflector plates
Used to bounce the radar signal back to the radar instrument for volume indication recording and piston level readings.

Abutment plates
Fixed to the outside of the piston fender to form a circumferential surface for the sealing membrane to roll against whilst the piston moves during operation.

Piston torsion ring
Around the base of the piston fender is a torsion ring which helps keep the piston shape during pressurisation. Concrete ballast can be added to the torsion ring to increase the weight of the piston and subsequently be a cost-effective way to increase the pressure of the gasholder to the required level.

=== Sealing membrane ===
The seal of the gasholder is designed to operate in the conditions specified by the client and to suit the stored medium. The seal rolls from the shell to the abutment surface of the piston and vice versa providing the piston with a frictionless self-centering facility. During depressurisation the seal (Usually rubber) also provides a gas tight facility that protects the holder from vacuum damage by blocking the gas outlet nozzle. During commissioning of the gasholder the sealing membrane is set into an operating condition. This setting must be carried out every time the gasholder is depressurised, otherwise known as "popping" the seal.
