= Hasanpaşa Gasworks =

Former gas plant in Istanbul, Turkey

- Hasanpaşa Gazhanesi
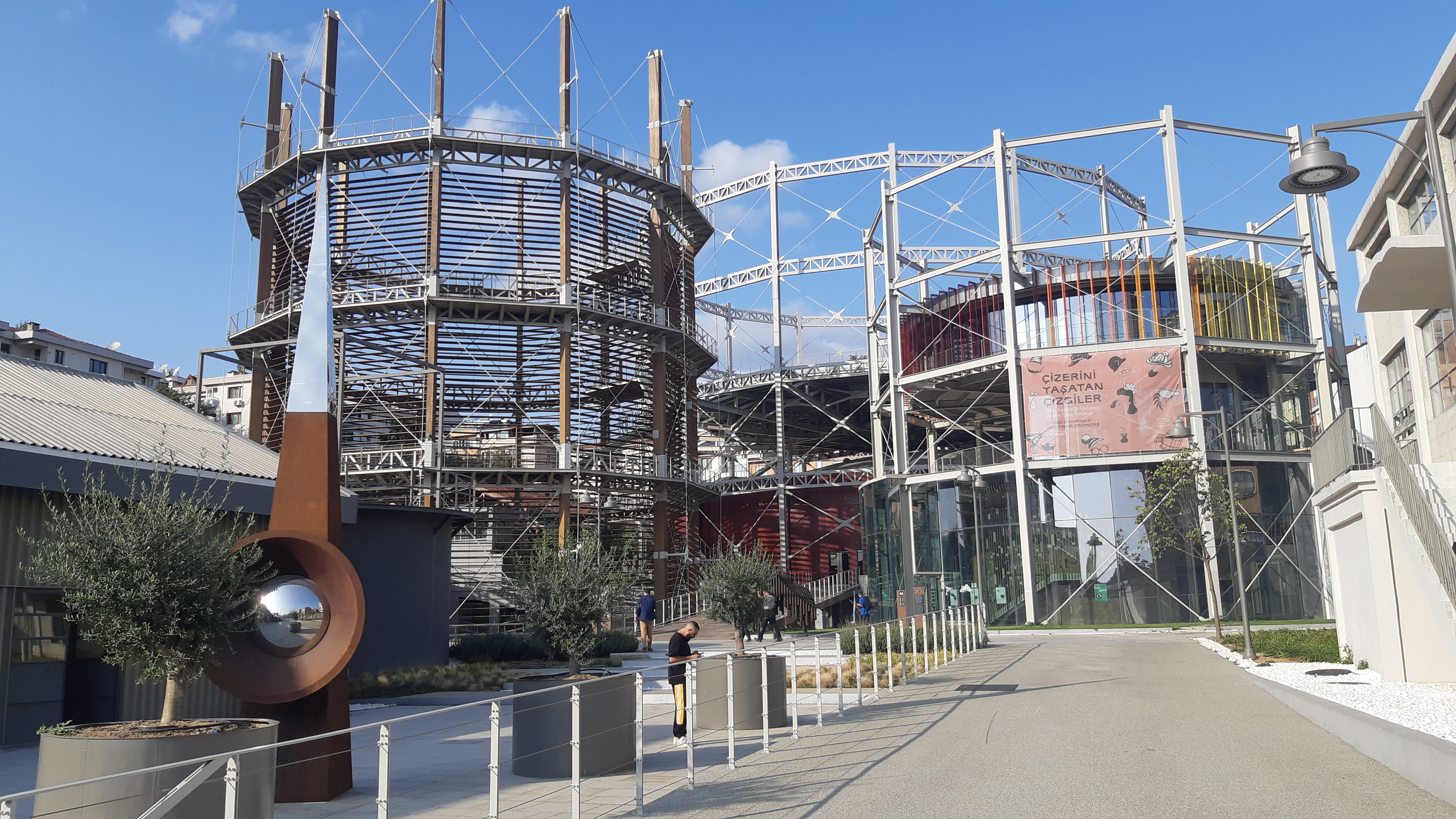
- General view of Hasanpaşa Gasworks (September 2021)
- Interactive map of the Hasanpaşa Gasworks area
- Alternative names: Kurbağalıdere Gasworks, Kadıköy Gasworks

General information
- Status: Closed
- Type: Gasworks
- Location: Hasanpaşa, Kadıköy, Istanbul, Turkey
- Coordinates: 40°59′51″N 29°02′36″E
- Groundbreaking: 1 August 1991
- Opened: 1892
- Closed: 13 June 1993
- Owner: (1892–1926) Üsküdar-kadıköy Gas Lighting Co.; (1926–1938) Istanbul Gas and Electricity Industrial Enterprise Turkish Inc. Co.; (1938–1944) Independent; (1944–1993) Istanbul Electricity, Tram and Funicular Co. (İETT)

Design and construction
- Architect: Guglielmo Semprini
- Developer: Charles Georges
Museum Gasworks
- Müze Gazhane
- Former name: Hasanpaşa Gasworks (Hasanpaşa Gazhanesi)
- Established: 9 July 2021; 5 years ago
- Location: Kurbağaşıdere Cad. 125, Hasanpaşa, Kadıköy, Istanbul, Turkey
- Type: Arts and cultural center, technology museum
- Website: <muzegazhane.istanbul

Hasanpaşa Gasworks (Turkish: Hasanpaşa Gazhanesi, also known as Kadıköy Gazhanesi or Kurbağalıdere Gazhanesi), today known as Museum Gasworks (Müze Gazhane), was a gasworks to produce coal gas in Istanbul, Turkey. Built in 1892, it was redeveloped into an arts, cultural center and technology museum in 2021.

== History ==
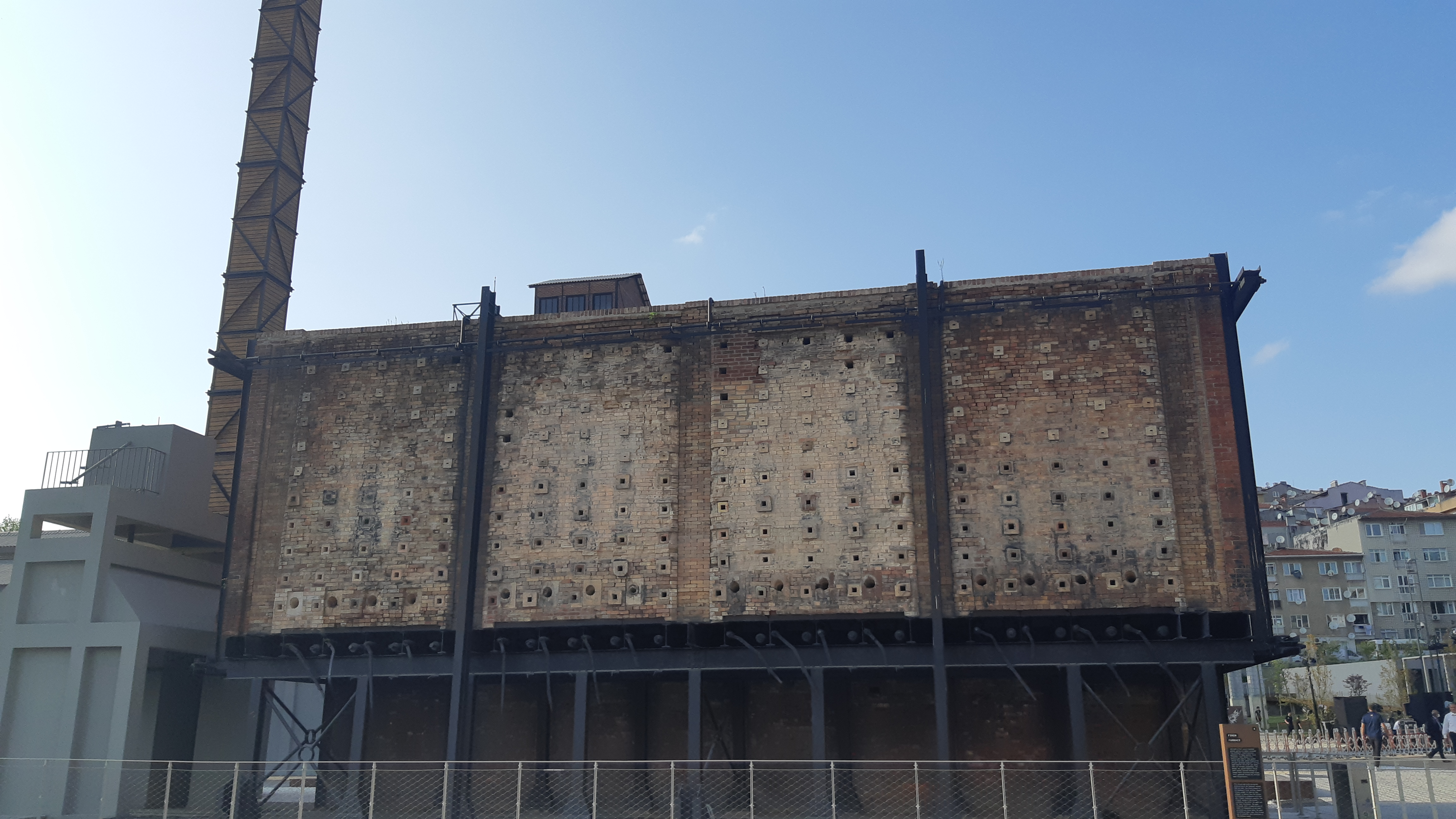
Industrial coke furnace of the Hasanpaşa Gasworks (September 2021).

Hasanpaşa Gasworks, today Museum Gasworks (Turkish: Müze Gazhane) is located at Kurbağalıdere St. 125 in Hasanpaşa neighborhood of Kadıköy district in Istanbul, Turkey.

It was built in 1892 during the Ottoman Empire to meet the need of coal gas and electric power on the Anatolian part of Istanbul. At that time, it was one of the four gasworks in Istanbul, the others were at Dolmabahçe, Yedikule and Kuzguncuk. The lighting of Istanbul's Anatolian side has been done since the 1860s by gas supplied from the Kuzguncuk Gasworks. As it became insufficient, the building of a new gasworks was projected. On 28 July 1891, a 50-years concession was granted to the Ottoman incorporated company "Lighting with Gas and Electricity" to serve the districts Kadıköy, Üsküdar and the Anatolian side with lighting and heating using coal gas. The agreement was signed between Engineer Anatoli Barcil representing Paris-based iron industrialist Charles Georges and Mayor Rıdvan Pasha representing the Ottoman State. Architect-contractor Guglielmo Semprini started the construction of the gasworks on 1 August 1891. The gasworks went into service in 1892 run by "Üsküdar-Kadıköy Gaz Şirket-i Tenviriyesi" ("Üsküdar-kadıköy Gas Lighting Company"). Located close to the stream Kurbağalıdere in Kadıköy, coal was brought over the stream, transported to the gasworks by rail, and processed to coal gas. The gasworks, named "Kurbağalıdere Gasworks" or "Kadıköy Gasworks", was called later as " Hasanpaşa Gasworks" due to its location.

The gasworks operated continuously until World War I. Its gas production discontinued from time to time shortly during and after the war. During the times of coal shortage, it fired olive pits to prevent interruption in gas supply. It continued to function during the Republican era. In October 1924, one year after the foundation of the Republic, the Turkish government extended the concession with the "Üsküdar-Kadıköy Gas Company" for another 50 years. The agreement was signed by Mayor Emin for the government and company's board member Arif Hilmet.The company, which run the Yedikule Gasworks, purchased the "Üsküdar-Kadıköy Gas Co." in 1926, and continued as "İstanbul Havagazı ve Elektrik Teşebbüsatı Sanaiye Türk Anonim Şirketi" ("Istanbul Gas and Electricity Industrial Enterprise Turkish Inc. Co.").

Between 1938 and 1944, Kadıköy Gasworks continued to exist independently. It served under the roof of the company "Istanbul Elektrik, Tramvay ve Tüne Şirketi, IETT" ("Istanbul Electricity, Tram and Funicular Co.") between 1945 and 1993.

The operation of the gasworks ceased on 13 June 1993 due to the decrease in gas demand after natural gas came into use.

== Redevelopment project ==
After the gasworks closed down, its land was used by the İETT as warehouse, garage, wrecking yard, garbage dump and coal storage. In 1994, it was decided to dismantle the remaining parts of the structure. The demolition was prevented as a result of the resistance of the residents and the support of non-governmental organizations. The gasworks was declared a protected area.

The non-profit organization "Gazhane Çevre Gönüllüleri" ("Gasworks Environmental Volunteers") started to organize in 1996, and turned into a cooperative in 1998. The volunteers requested to transform the gasworks into a cultural center. Eight festivals were held at the site until 2009. The free-of-charge festivals consisted of exhibitions, music concerts, dance and theatre shows.

A restoration project was prepared by Istanbul Technical University (İTÜ) between 1998 and 2001. After approval of the project by the Conservation Board in 2014, Istanbul Metropolitan Municipality issued invitations for tender on 8 January the same year. Responsible for the supervision and direction of the project was the History of Architecture and Restoration Deportment at İTÜ's Faculty of Architecture.

The renovation works started on 7 March 2014 and were completed in 2021 with two years delay.

== Museum Gasworks ==
The building was opened as the new culture and arts center of Istanbul on 9 July 2021, under the name of "Müze Gazhane" ("Museum Gasworks"). It is a science and technology museum with a cartoon exhibition section. The museum covers an area of 30,000 m^{2} (320,000 sq ft). It consists of a library having about 10,000 books, named after Prof. Afife Batur, the leader of the restoration project, two theater halls, one with 300 seating capacity and the other one with 130 seater, cafeteria, restaurant and social areas.

== See also ==
- Kuzguncuk Gasworks (1865–1992), a historic gasworks on the Anatolian part in Üsküdar district of Istanbul, Turkey.
- Yedikule Gasworks (1887–1993), a historic gasworks on the European part in Fatih district of Istanbul, Turkey.

== Gallery ==
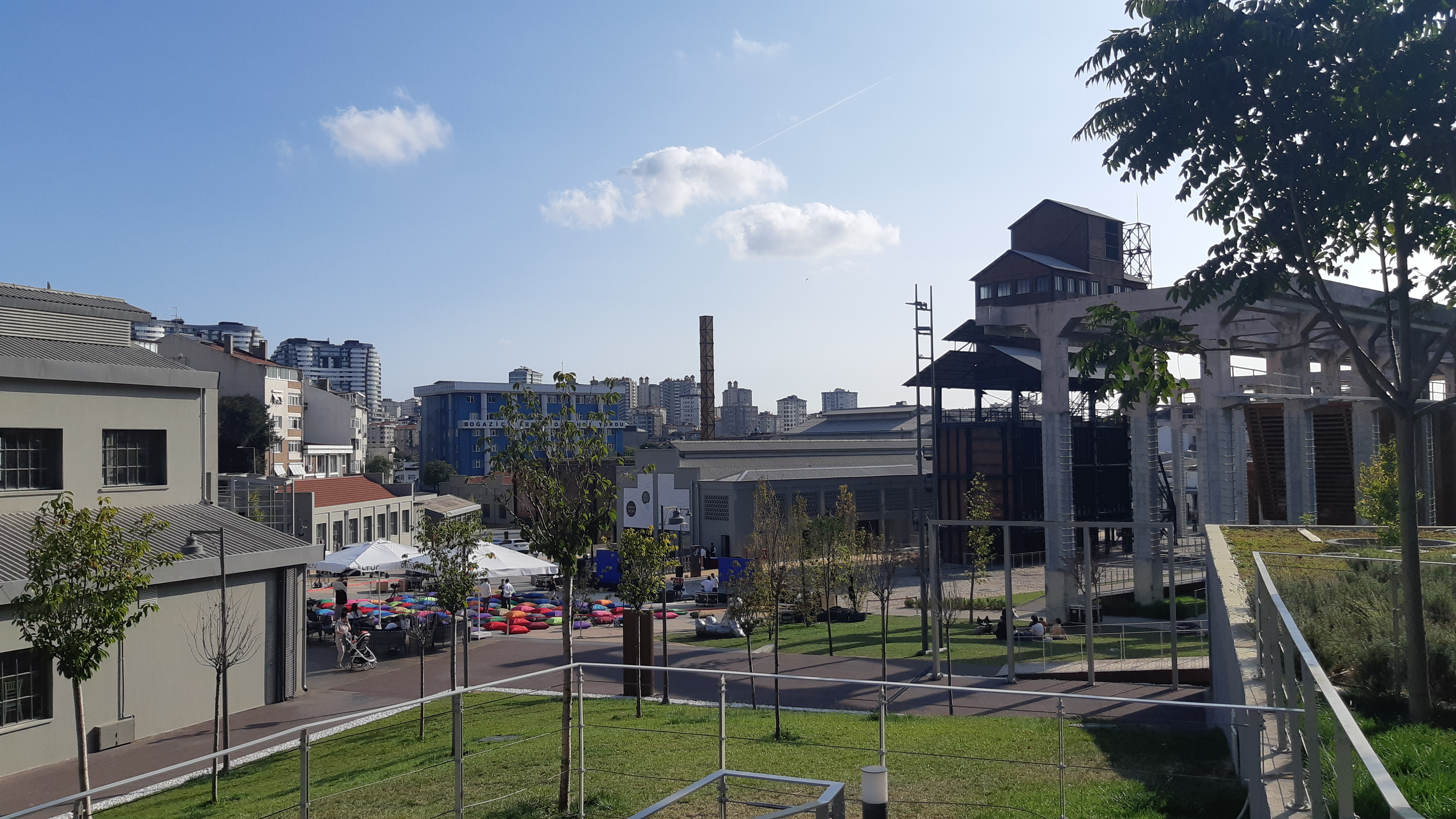
Site of the Gasworks

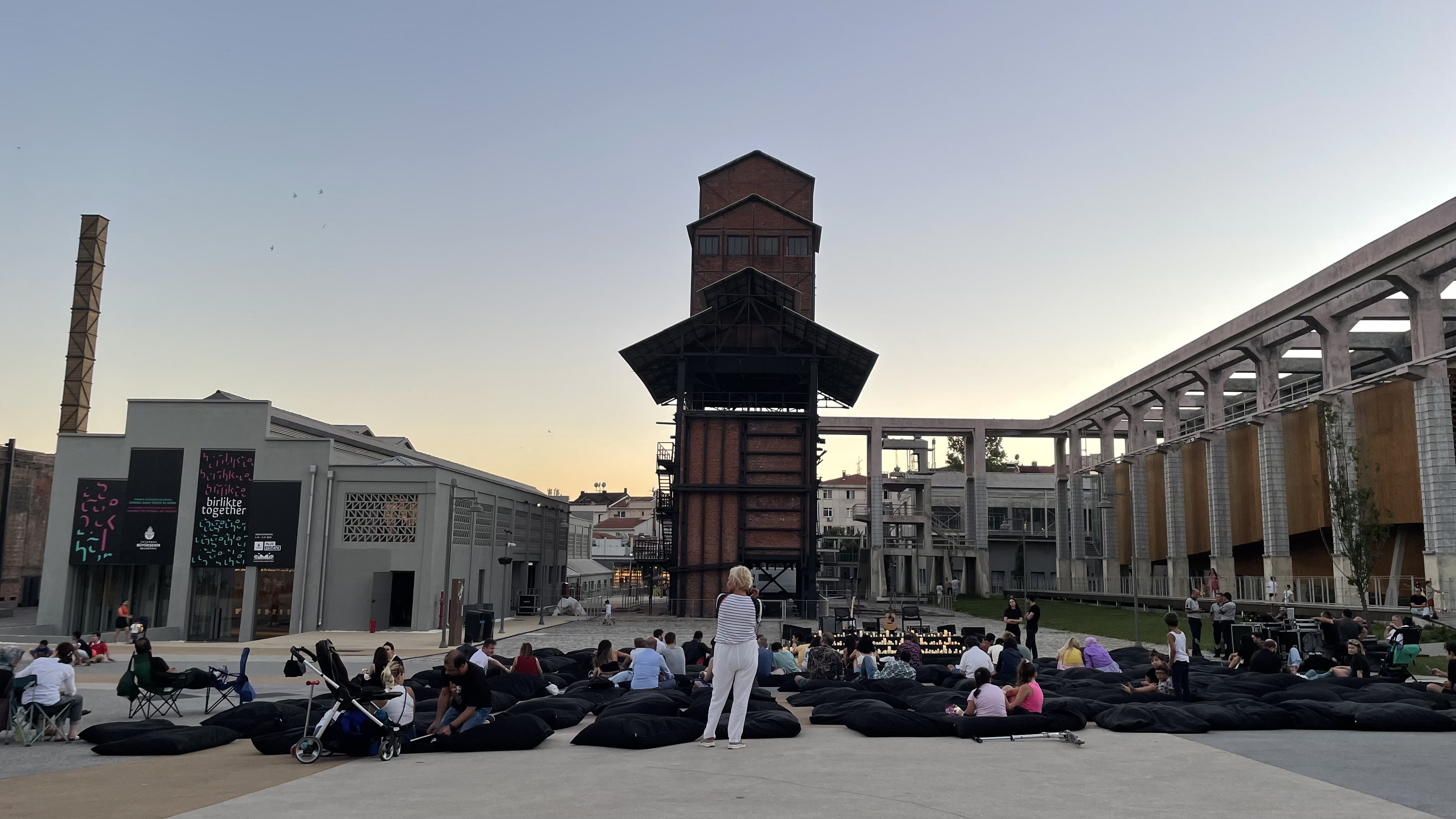
Open air concert inside the complex

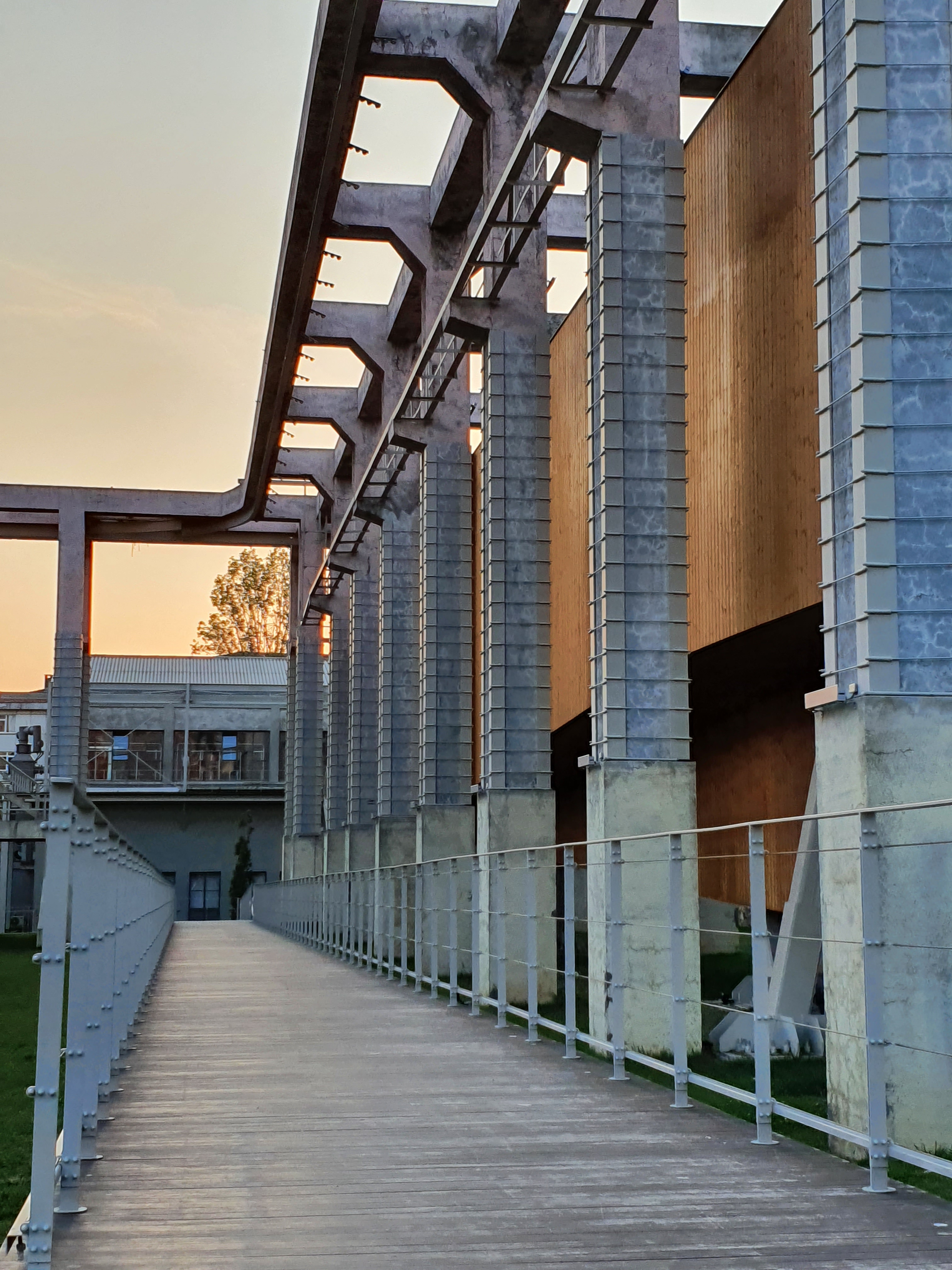
Site of the Gasworks

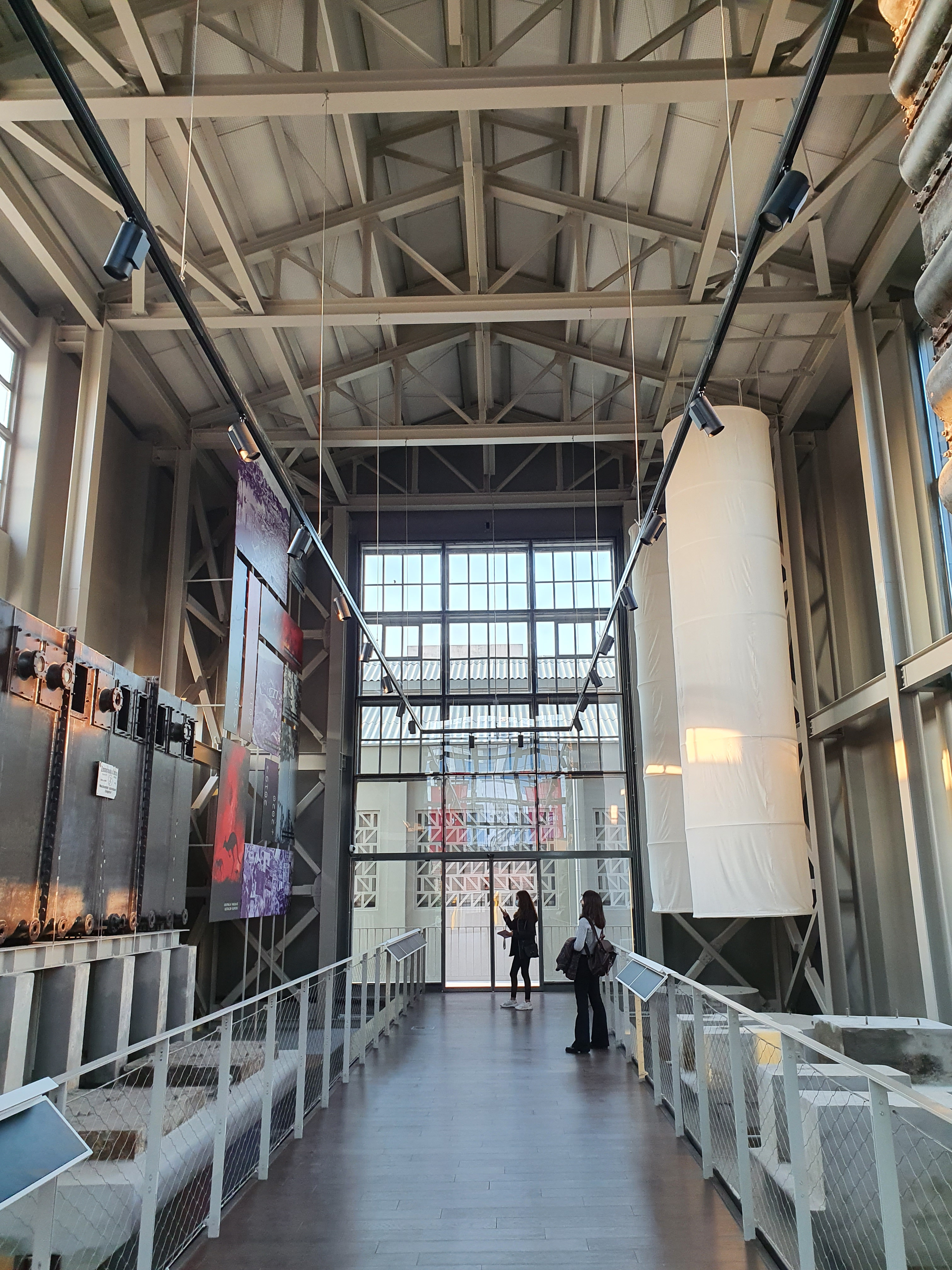
A view from the museum's interior.

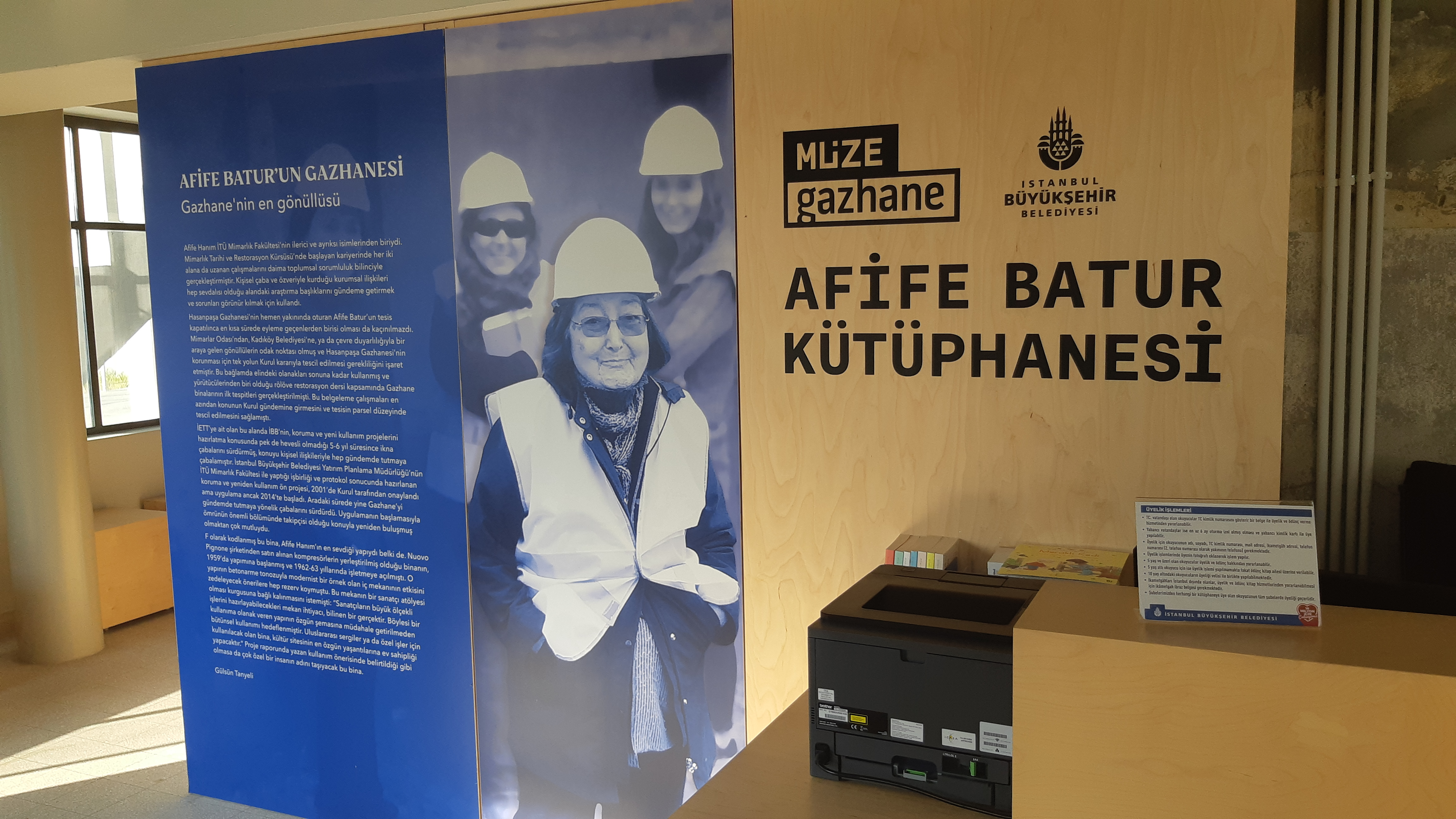
Afife Batur Library at the museum.
