= Gasworks =

Industrial plant producing flammable gas

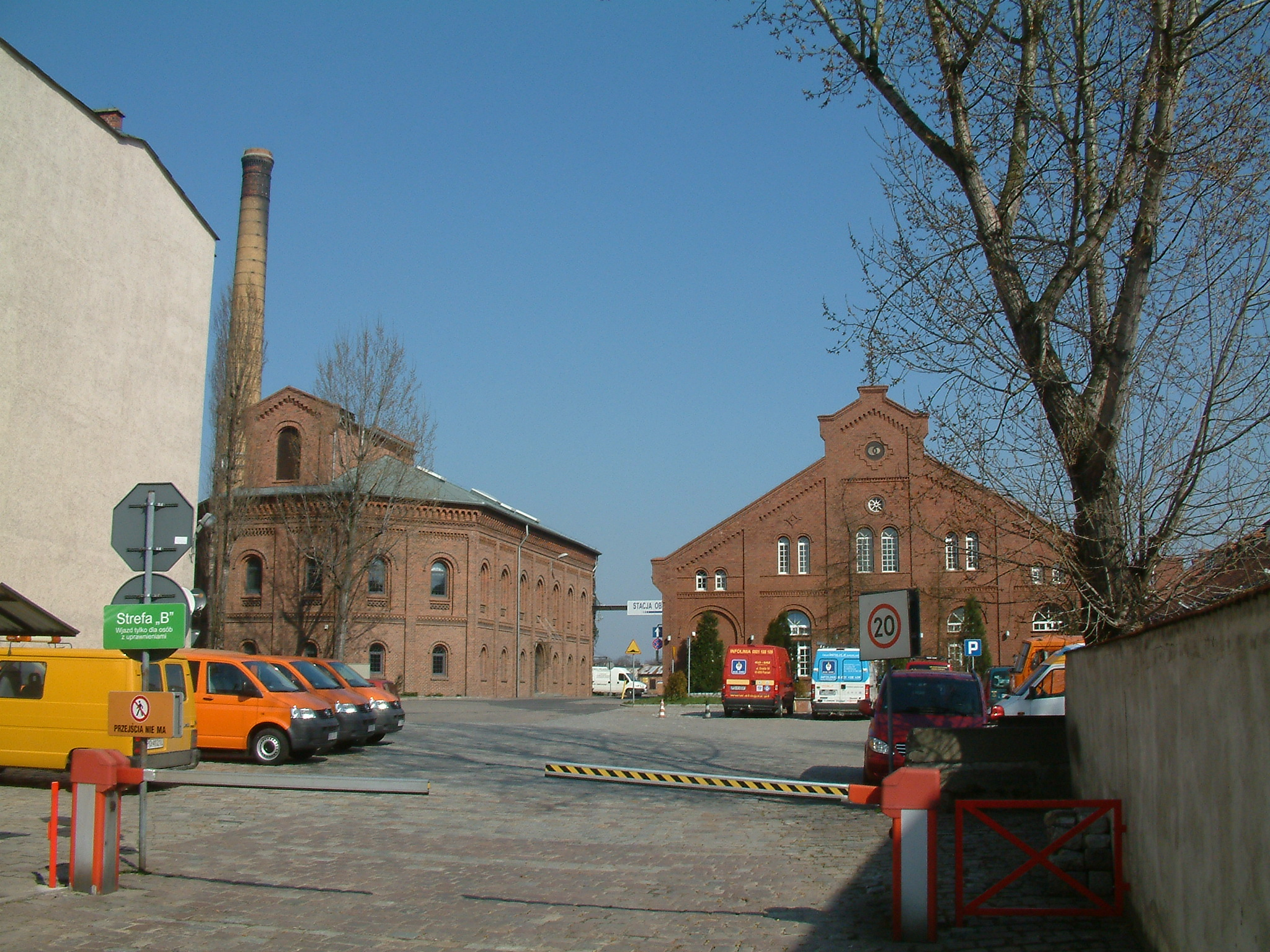
Municipal gasworks in Poznań that produced coal gas between 1856 and 1973. Currently used for distribution of natural gas.

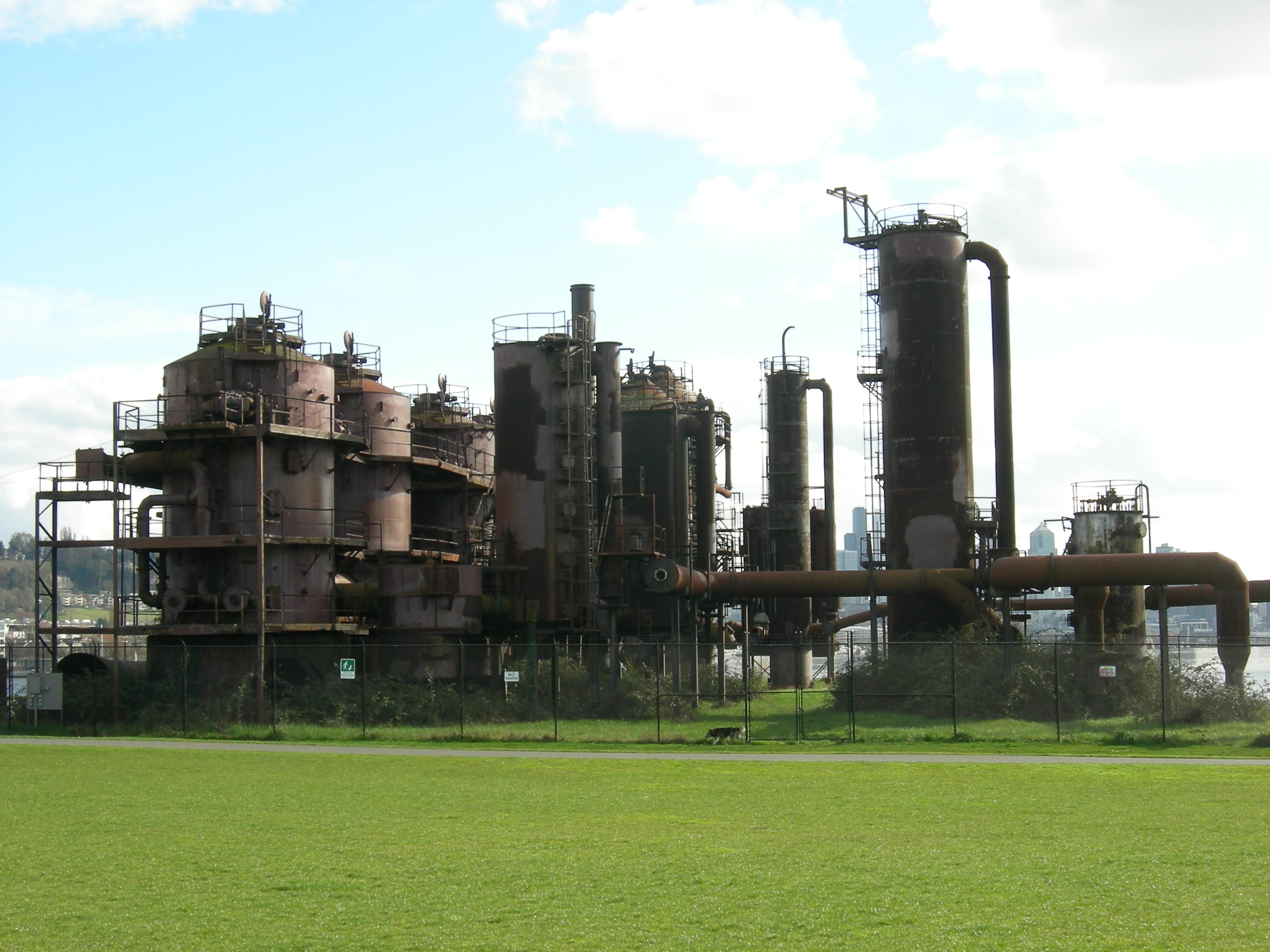
Gas Works Park, a disused gasworks that has become a public park, in Seattle, Washington

A gasworks or gas house is fundamentally a scalable (by output quantity) flammable gas producer/generator whose size depends on the scale of the gas distribution system it supports.

Coal-based town gas production was generally displaced by petroleum-based gas and natural gas. However, Great Britain continued the use of coal-based town gas until the North Sea natural gas discoveries in the 1960s and 1970s. Many of these have been made redundant in the developed world by the use of natural gas, though they are still used for storage space.

== Type ==
Infrastructure type	Primary feedstock	Gas type	Scale & logic
Normal to massive central gasworks	Bituminous coal	Town gas	Centralized "production & distribution" Utility using a "topographic reticulation (mesh network)" of pipes for street lighting, metropolitan heating, and heavy industry.
Centralized sub-plant	Coke + Air	Producer gas (Internal)	Centralized Utility: Located inside the main gasworks to heat the coal retorts.
Centralized sub-plant	Coke + steam + oil	CWG	Centralized utility: integrated into "larger works" to handle "peak shaving" of town gas demand.
Niche oil-gas works	Naphtha / shale oil	Pintsch gas	Specialized distribution of portable "bottled" gas for rail carriages and maritime buoys.
Onsite industrial to mini remote gasworks	Coke + steam + air	Semi-water gas (Halbwassergas)	Factories able to generate their own low cost "power gas" without being connected to a city gas main.
Micro remote gasworks	Anthracite / coke / charcoal	Producer gas (external)	Standalone units for isolated tasks

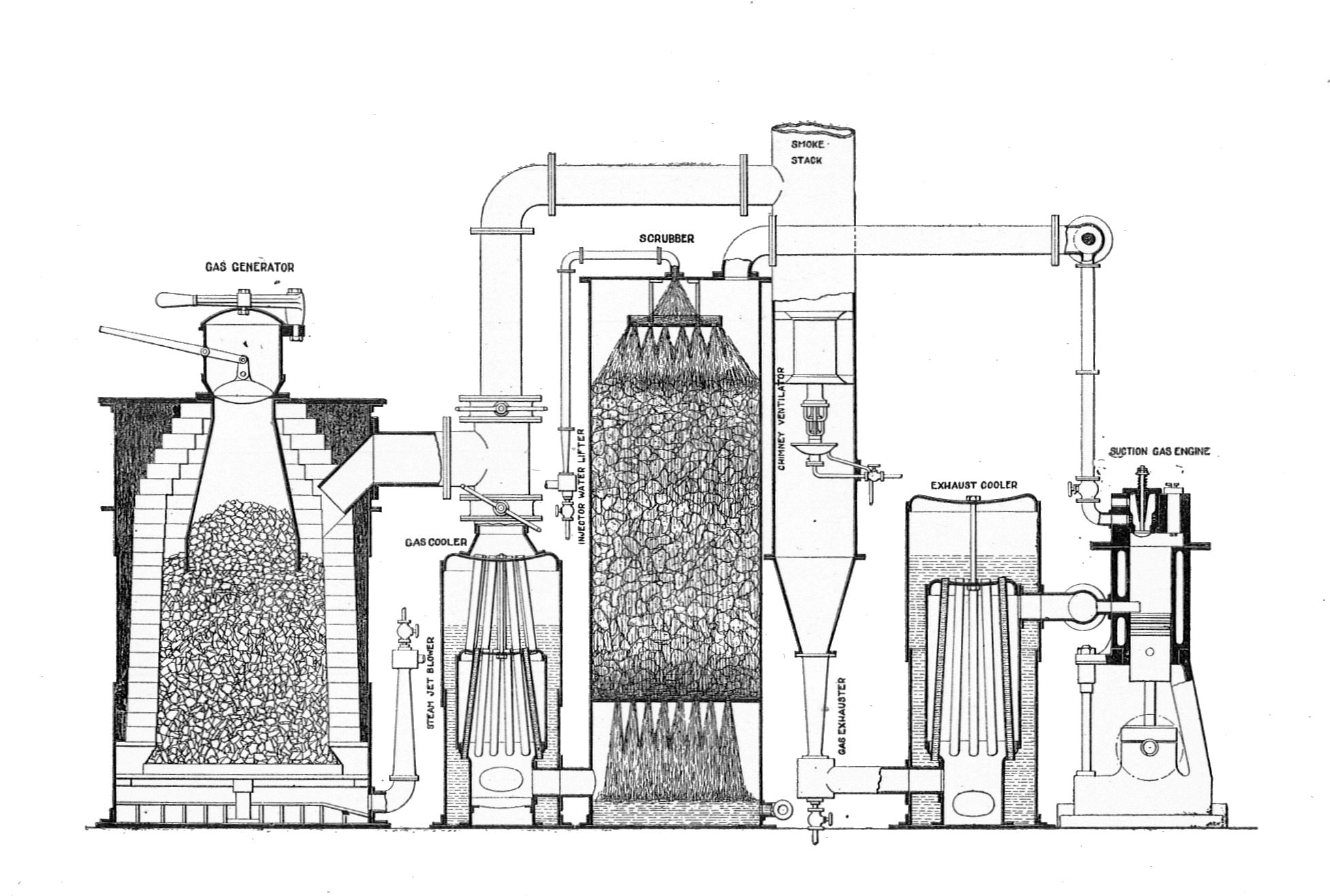
Remote System of "Suction" Aspirated Engine and Micro-Gasworks (ft. vertical generator)

=== Remote uses ===
Gasworks reliant aspirated engine type
Technical label		Fuel delivery logic
Standard	Constant volume (Otto cycle)	Constant "pushed" gas delivery from a pressurized main
Suction	Demand-variable (suction cycle)	Gas is "pulled" from an adjacent micro gasworks

Type	Primary feedstock	Scale & logic	Primary remote uses
Dowson Gas Plant	Anthracite / coke	Mini-utility: small plant with a boiler and a pressurized gasholder supporting a remote (Otto cycle) engine.	Private estate "mini-grids", remote isolated hotels
Remote gasworks	Anthracite / coke	Standalone: engine (suction cycle) "on-demand" fuel	Railway signaling, water pumping, rock pulverization (ore), small business and farm mechanization
Waste By-product producer	Sawdust, rice husks, coconut shells	Feedstock scavenger standalone: waste-to-energy conversion	Sawmills, plantations

=== Gasworks for industrial districts and remote locations ===
Gasworks, specifically for Mond gas, made low-quality gas (which was sold at low cost) on a massive scale for industrial districts. They used cheap coal slack and recovered ammonia as a byproduct, then piped the low-quality gas to nearby factories. It was a "centralized" version of a "remote" technology.

Location of gasworks	Engine type	Connection
Remote	Suction	Connected directly to an adjacent micro gasworks
Centralized	Standard	Connected to a large iron "town gas" main
Industrial (centralized)	Mond	Otto cycle gas engine featuring a non-standard, larger-bore cylinder, connected to a Mond gas industrial district main.

== Early gasworks ==
Gasified coal was introduced to Great Britain in the 1790s as an illuminating gas by the Scottish inventor William Murdoch.

Early gasworks were usually located beside a river or canal so that coal could be brought in by barge. Transport was later shifted to railways and many gasworks had internal railway systems with their own locomotives.

Early gasworks were built for factories in the Industrial Revolution from about 1805 as a light source and for industrial processes requiring gas, and for lighting in country houses from about 1845. Country house gas works are extant at Culzean Castle in Scotland and Owlpen in Gloucestershire.

=== Wood-gas process ===
1878 European towns lighted by a gaswork using forest timber for gas production:

- Bayreuth
- Coburg
- Wurtzburg
- Darmstadt
- Kempten
- Regensburg
- Aarau
- Landshut
- Zurich
- Giessen
- St. Gallen
- Ulm
- Erlangen
- Lucerne
- Salzburg
- Innsbruck
- Chur
- Passau
- Reutlingen
- Heilbronn
- Trient
- Solothurn
- Augsburg
- Munich

=== Oil-gas process ===
Early 20th century towns lighted by a gaswork using the petroleum industry's undesirable heavy oil for gas production:

- Los Angeles, CA
- San Francisco, CA
- Portland, OR
- Vancouver, BC

	Bunker C / No. 6 Fuel Oil (firing steam boilers in power plants and large vehicles)	Gasworks heavy oil (feedstock)
Type	Residual Fuel Oil (RFO), the heavy non-volatile residue left after fractional distillation	Residual Fuel Oil (RFO), often called gas oil or crude oil (if a whole, heavy crude was used)
Market	A direct-burn fuel to make steam.	Feedstock for cracking into a gaseous fuel (town gas)
Price	Generally the cheapest commercial petroleum product by volume, as it was the byproduct remaining after all other valuable cuts were distilled.	Price was determined by its cracking efficiency—a slightly cleaner heavy oil, yielding more town gas, would justify a higher price than lower yielding pure RFO/waste oil.

1. The "blast" (heating) phase: oil and air were injected into the generators and ignited.
2. The "run" (gas-making) phase: the air was shut off, and steam was injected alongside a "gas-making" spray of oil.
3. Scrubbing and washing
4. Purification

Oil-Gas Process: Pre-1915 vs. Post-1915 "Improved" process by E.C. and L.B. Jones
Pre-1915	Post-1915
High-candlepower light (illumination)	High-BTU heat (heating & power)
Waste product. Large quantities of wet, oily soot that was difficult to manage. A major disposal expense and environmental pollutant.	A revenue stream; sold as "Magic Black Briquets" for home heating.

== Equipment ==
A gasworks was divided into several sections for the production, purification and storage of gas.

=== Retort house ===
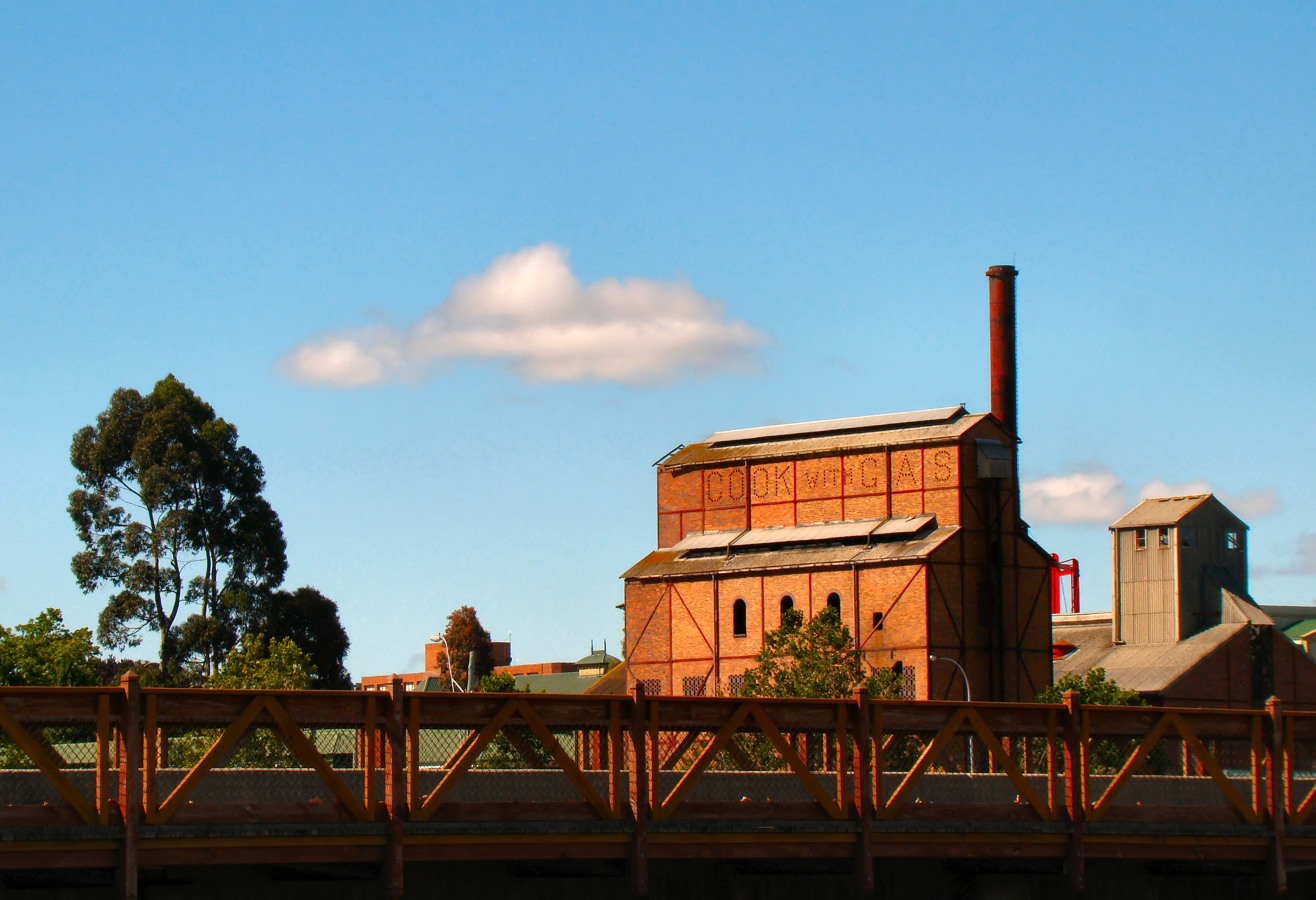
Retort house at the Launceston Gasworks, Launceston, Tasmania

This contained the retorts in which coal was heated to generate the gas. The crude gas was siphoned off and passed on to the condenser. The waste product left in the retort was coke. In many cases the coke was then burned to heat the retorts or sold as smokeless fuel.

=== Condenser ===
This consisted of a bank of air-cooled gas pipes over a water-filled sump. Its purpose was to remove tar from the gas by condensing it out as the gas was cooled. Occasionally the condenser pipes were contained in a water tank similar to a boiler but operated in the same manner as the air-cooled variant. The tar produced was then held in a tar well/tank which was also used to store liquor.

=== Exhauster ===
An impeller or pump was used to increase the gas pressure before scrubbing. Exhausters were optional components and could be placed anywhere along the purifying process but were most often placed after the condensers and immediately before the gas entered the gas holders.

=== Scrubber ===
A sealed tank containing water through which the gas was bubbled. This removed ammonia and ammonium compounds. The water often contained dissolved lime to aid the removal of ammonia. The water left behind was known as ammonical liquor. Other versions of the purifier consisted of a tower packed with coke, through which water was trickled.

=== Purifier ===
Also known as an iron sponge, this removed hydrogen sulfide from the gas by passing it over wooden trays containing moist ferric oxide. The gas then passed on to the gasholder and the iron sulfide was sold to extract the sulfur. Waste from this process often gave rise to blue billy, a ferrocyanide contaminant in the land which causes problems when trying to redevelop an old gasworks site.

=== Gasholder ===
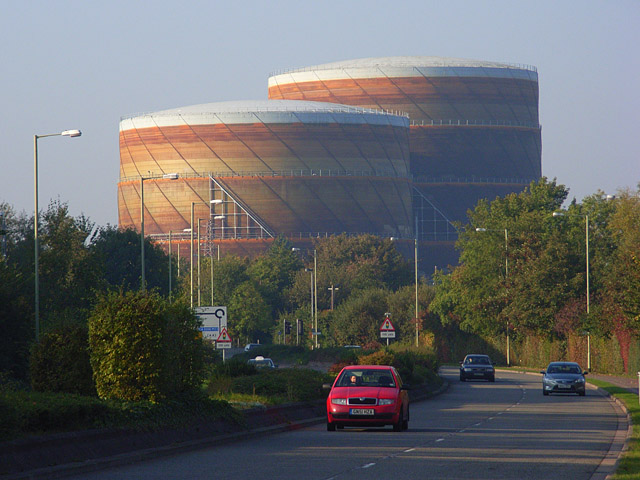
Gas-holders, Reading

The gas holder or gasometer was a tank used for storage of the gas and to maintain even pressure in distribution pipes. The gas holder usually consisted of an upturned steel bell contained within a large frame that guided it as it rose and fell depending on the amount of gas it contained.

== Types of gases produced ==
The following gases were produced in gas plants, among other things:

- Wood gas, made from wood.
- Lignite gas, instead of using hard coal (bituminous/coke), brown coal (lignite) was used.
- Coal gas - retort gas - luminous gas - city gas, coal gas shines bright as an open flame.
- Oil gas (Pintsch gas, Blau gas), produced by super-heating oil in the absence of air. This gas was bottled to be transportable. (Note: "Cracking gas" belongs to a family of fuels derived from liquid hydrocarbons ("mineral oil"/"coal oil", terms in the 1800s used interchangeably). The term "cracking" refers to using high heat to break down long, heavy oil molecules into smaller, lighter gas molecules. Gas [from] oil/oil gas/mineral oil gases: Kerosene gas: Retort-produced from kerosene (called "coal oil" or "illuminating oil" in the 1800s) [liquid to gas process]; Kerosene oil was the "middle distillate" cut of oil produced during the refining process of crude oil from Torbanite or Cannel Coal. It sits between light naphtha and heavy lubricating grease; Cleaner than coal gas (which contained sulfur and ammonia) and produced a significantly brighter, whiter light (higher candlepower).; Required mediation of kerosene gas being too rich in carbon which produced black soot (lampblack).; Pintsch gas: Crude petroleum, shale oil, naphtha; Always marketed as a "mineral oil gas"; Compressed gas (remains gaseous); Blau gas: Lignite oils, shale oils, refined gas oil; Produced in "mineral oil refineries"; Liquefied gas (stored as liquid))
- Water gas - blue water gas - BWG, a primitive Syngas, produced from hot coke and hot water vapor (300∘C /572∘F steam), that burns blue—unsuitable for lighting until enrichment to CWG.
- Coal gasification, similar to Syngas, but using air (which contains oxygen and nitrogen) instead of pure steam or oxygen. The practice of gasworks using their red-hot coke byproduct to make Producer Gas, began in the first half of the 19th century.

The historical lighting of towns relied heavily on town gas, which was primarily coal gas for much of the 19th century. Water gas (upgraded to CWG) was introduced later.

=== Benzole plant ===
- Benzole: A mixture of aromatic hydrocarbons including benzene, toluene, and xylenes (BTX).

Often only used at large gasworks sites, including those in continental Europe, a benzole plant consisted of a series of vertical tanks containing petroleum oil through which the gas was bubbled. The purpose of a benzole plant was to extract benzole from the gas. The benzole dissolved into the petroleum oil was run through a steam separating plant to be sold separately as a motor fuel and chemical feedstock.

=== Byproducts and derived hydrocarbons ===
The by-products of gas-making, such as coke, coal tar, ammonia and sulfur had many uses.

The thermal decomposition of coal and oil at gasworks produced a variety of valuable and often toxic chemical substances in addition to the manufactured Town Gas. The efficient recovery and subsequent sale of these materials—which often became feedstocks for the nascent chemical and dye industries—was crucial to the economic success of the gasworks.

Coal Tar, a complex mixture of organic compounds, was subjected to fractional distillation to extract numerous products, including:

- Naphthalene: a solid aromatic hydrocarbon that was filtered out from the gas stream.
- Creosote: a tar-derived oil used primarily as a wood preservative.
- Phenols and cresols: hydrocarbon derivatives used as disinfectants and raw materials for early plastics.
- Pitch: The final residue from tar distillation, widely used for roads and roofing.

Non-hydrocarbon and waste products

- Coke: The solid carbon residue left after heating the coal, sold as a smokeless fuel or used to create water gas.
- Ammonia: removed by scrubbing the gas with water, resulting in "ammoniacal liquor". It was processed and sold as ammonium sulfate fertilizer.
- Sulfur/spent oxide: hydrogen sulfide was removed using moist iron oxide or lime. The resulting iron sulfide ("Spent oxide") was later sold for the manufacture of sulfuric acid.
- "Blue Billy": A toxic, visible waste created when hydrogen cyanide in the crude gas reacted with iron in the purification material, forming ferrocyanide compounds (Prussian blue).

== British gasworks today ==
Coal gas is no longer made in the UK but many gasworks sites are still used for storage and metering of natural gas and some of the old gasometers are still in use. Fakenham gasworks dating from 1846 is the only complete, non-operational gasworks remaining in England. Other examples exist at Biggar in Scotland and Carrickfergus in Northern Ireland.

== Gasworks in popular culture ==
Gasworks were noted for their foul smell and generally located in the poorest metropolitan areas. Cultural remnants of gasworks include many streets named Gas Street or Gas Avenue and groups or gangs known as Gas House Gang, such as the 1934 St. Louis Cardinals baseball team. The 1946 film Gas House Kids features children from New York's Gas House District taking on a gang, and spawned two sequels. Ewan McColl's 1968 song "Dirty Old Town" (about his home town of Salford) famously begins "Found my love by the gaswork croft" (in cover versions often "I met my love by the gasworks wall")

Fans of Bristol Rovers F.C. in south west England are known as 'Gas-Heads' due to the proximity of gasometers near to their original ground at Eastville in Bristol. Bristol Rovers F.C. is also known as 'The Gas'.

== Railway gasworks ==
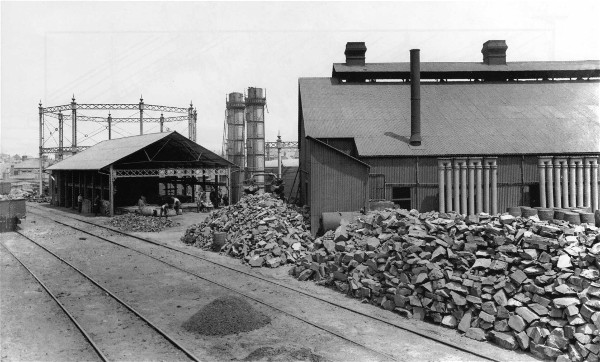
Eveleigh gasworks

Gas was used for many years to illuminate the interior of railway carriages. The New South Wales Government Railways manufactured its own oil-gas for this purpose, together with reticulated coal-gas to railway stations and associated infrastructure. Such works were established at the Macdonaldtown Carriage Sheds, Newcastle, Bathurst, Junee and Werris Creek. These plants followed on from the works of a private supplier which the railway took over in 1884.

Gas was also transported in special travelling gas reservoir wagons from the gasworks to stationary reservoirs located at a number of country stations where carriage reservoirs were replenished.

With the spreading conversion to electric power for lighting buildings and carriages during the 1920s and 1930s, the railway gasworks were progressively decommissioned.

== Gasworks being operated as industrial museums ==
=== Gasworks Brisbane, Australia ===
The Gasworks Newstead site in Brisbane Australia has been a stalwart of the river's edge since its development in 1863. By 1890, the works were supplying gas to Brisbane streets from Toowong to Hamilton and over the next 100 years, it would grow to supply Brisbane city with the latest in gas technology until it was decommissioned in 1996.

In March 1866, the Queensland Defence Force placed an official request for town gas connection, evidence of the vital role the gasworks played in the economic development of colonial Brisbane. In fact, the gasworks were considered to be of such importance, that during World War II, genuine fears of attack from Japanese air raids motivated the installation of anti aircraft guns which vigilantly watched over the plant and its employees throughout the war.

The site itself has been synonymous with economic growth and benefit to Brisbane and Queensland with the success of the gasworks facilitating further development of the Newstead/Teneriffe area to include the James Hardie fibro-cement manufacturing plant, Shell Oil plant, Brisbane Water and Sewerage Depot and even the “Brisbane Gas Company Cookery School” which operated in the 1940s. In 1954, a carbonizing plant was built, giving Brisbane the "most modern gas producing plant in Australia", consuming 100 tonnes of coal every eight hours.

During its golden years in the late 19th and early 20th centuries, the site also played a role in providing employment to aboriginal Australians and many migrant workers arriving there from Europe after the second World War.

The tradition of the Brisbane Gasworks economic and employment-based successes will not be lost or forgotten with the Teneriffe Gasworks Village Development paying homage to the sites history and integrity in its pending urban development.

The gasholder structure at this site is set to become a hub of a new property development on the site – keeping the structural integrity of the pig iron structure. It will be a reflection of urban renewal embracing its industrial past.

=== Dunedin Gasworks Museum ===
Located in South Dunedin, New Zealand, the Dunedin Gasworks Museum consists of a conserved engine house featuring a working boiler house, fitting shop and collection of five stationary steam engines. There are also displays of domestic and industrial gas appliances.

=== Technopolis (Gazi) ===
Located in Athens, Greece Technopolis (Gazi) is a gasworks converted to an exhibition space.

=== The Gas Museum, Leicester ===
The Gas Museum in Leicester, UK, is operated by The National Gas Museum Trust.

=== Gas Works Park ===
Gas Works Park is a public park in Seattle, Washington.

=== Warsaw Gasworks Museum ===
The Warsaw Gasworks Museum is a museum in Warsaw, Poland.

=== Museo dell'Acqua e del Gas ===
The Museo dell'Acqua e del Gas is a museum in Genoa, Italy. It is located in the industrial area of the IREN company, an Italian multi-utility, where coal gas has been produced till 1972. The small Museum, managed by Fondazione AMGA, hosts a rich collection of industrial finds, related to water and gas works history.

=== Hasanpaşa Gasworks ===
Hasanpaşa Gasworks is an 1892-built gasworks in Istanbul, Turkey, which was redeveloped into a museum in 2021.

== See also ==
- History of manufactured fuel gases
- British Gas plc
