= Gas House Gang (disambiguation) =

The Gas House Gang was a New York street gang during the late 19th century.

Gas House Gang may also refer to:

- Gas House Gang (quartet), a barbershop quartet
- Gashouse Gang, the 1934 St. Louis Cardinals baseball team
- The Gashouse Gang, a 2007 book by John Heidenry
