= Gas holder =

Large container for storing gaseous fuel

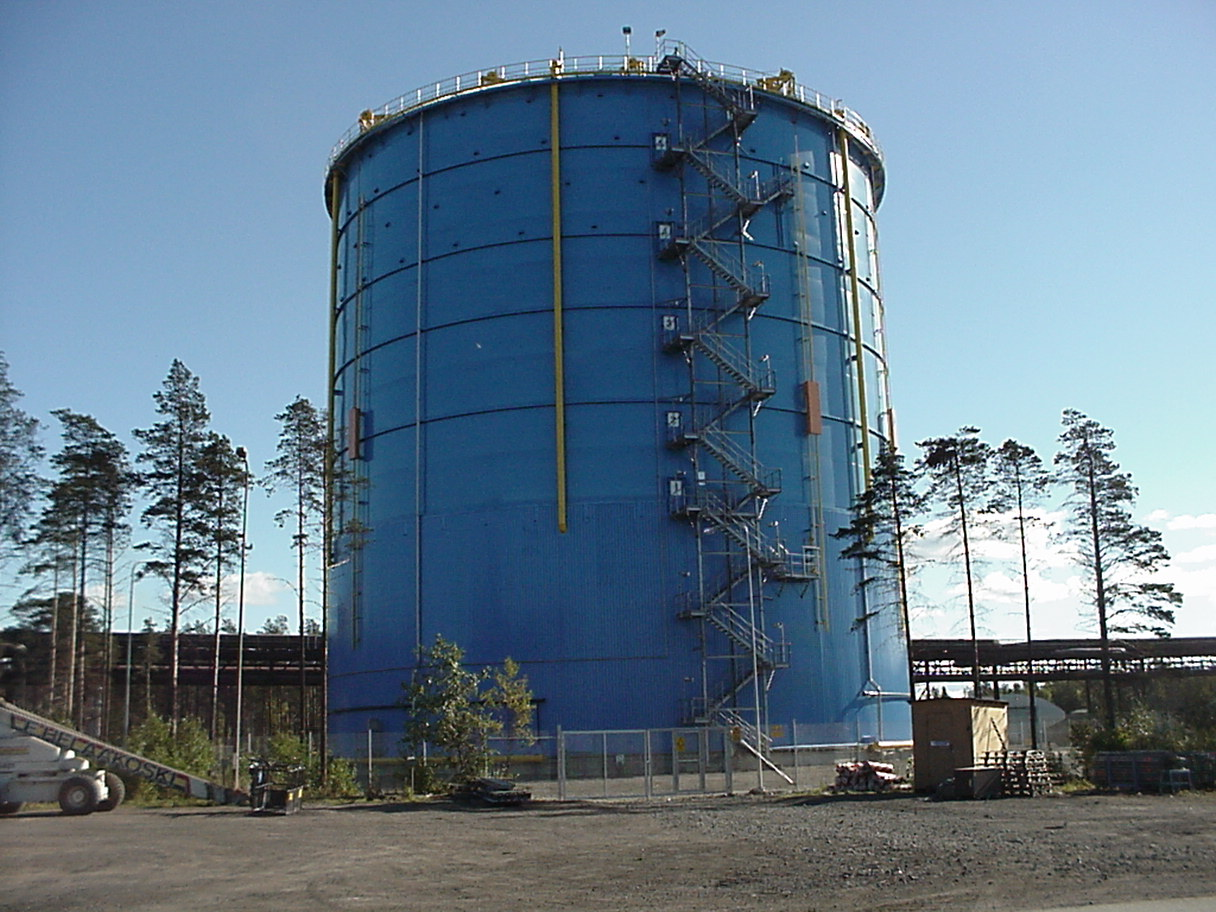
30,000 m^{3} (1,100,000 cu ft) blast furnace gas holder at Rautaruukki Steel in Finland

A gas holder or gasholder, also known as a gasometer, is a large container in which natural gas or town gas (coal gas or formerly also water gas) is stored near atmospheric pressure at ambient temperatures. The volume of the container follows the quantity of stored gas, with pressure coming from the weight of a movable cap. Typical volumes for large gas holders are about 50,000 cubic metres (1,800,000 ft^{3}), with 60-metre-diameter (200 ft) structures.

Gas holders now tend to be used for balancing purposes to ensure that gas pipes can be operated within a safe range of pressures, rather than for actually storing gas for later use.

== Etymology ==
Antoine Lavoisier devised the first gas holder, which he called a gazomètre, to assist his work in pneumatic chemistry. It enabled him to weigh the gas in a pneumatic trough with the precision he required. He published his Traité Élémentaire de Chimie in 1789. James Watt Junior collaborated with Thomas Beddoes in constructing the pneumatic apparatus, a short-lived piece of medical equipment that incorporated a gazomètre. Watt then adapted the gazomètre for coal gas storage.

The anglicisation "gasometer" was adopted by William Murdoch, the inventor of gas lighting, in 1782, as the name for his gas holders. Murdoch's associates objected that his "gasometer" was not a meter but a container, but the name was retained and came into general use. Gas holders were marked as gasometers on the large-scale maps issued by the British Ordnance Survey and the term came to be used to label gas works, even though there may be several gas holders at any one gas works. However, the term "gasometer" is still discouraged for use in technical circles, where "gas holder" is preferred.

The spelling "gas holder" is used by the BBC, among other institutions, but the variant "gasholder" is more commonly used.

== History ==
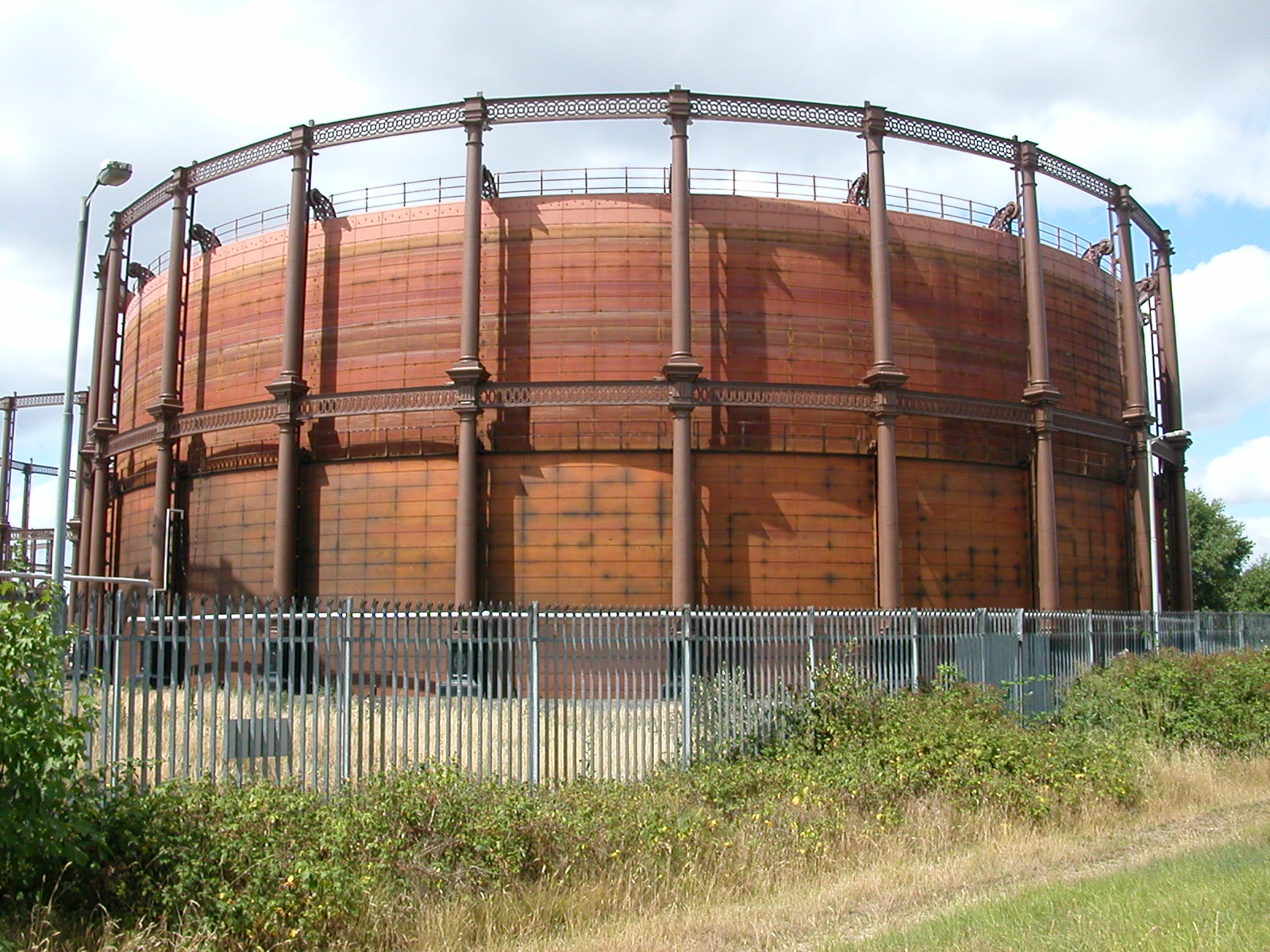
A two-lift braced column-supported gas holder in West Ham, East London

Before the mid-20th century coal gas was produced in retorts by heating coal in the absence of air, the process being known as coal gasification. Coal gas was first used for municipal lighting, the gas being passed through wooden or metal pipes from the retort to the lantern. The first public piped gas supply was to thirteen gas lamps installed along the length of Pall Mall, London, in 1807. The credit for this installation goes to the German inventor and entrepreneur Frederick Albert Winsor. Digging up streets to lay pipes required easements, and this delayed both further installation of street lighting and the installation of gas for domestic illumination, heating and cooking.

Many people experimented with coal distillation to produce a flammable gas, including Jean Tardin (1618), Clayton (1684), Jean-Pierre Minckelers, Leuven (1785) and Pickel (D)(1786). William Murdoch was successful. He joined Boulton and Watt at the Soho manufactory in Birmingham in 1777, and in 1792 he built a retort to heat coal to produce the gas that illuminated his home and office in Redruth. His system lacked a storage method until James Watt Junior adapted a Lavoisier gazomètre for this purpose. A gasometer was incorporated into the first small gasworks built for the Soho manufactory in 1798.

William Murdoch and his pupil Samuel Clegg went on to install retorts in individual factories and other workplaces. The earliest was in 1805, at Lee & Phillips, Salford Twist Mill, where eight gas holders were installed. This was shortly followed by one in Sowerby Bridge, constructed by Clegg for Henry Lodge.

The first independent commercial gas works were built by the Gas Light and Coke Company in Great Peter Street, Westminster, in 1812, with wooden pipes laid to gas lights on Westminster Bridge on New Year's Eve in 1813. Public gas lights were seen as a means to reduce crime and until the 1840s they were regulated by police authorities.

Because of safety concerns expressed by the Royal Society, the size of gas holders was limited to 6,000 cubic feet (170 m^{3}) and they were enclosed in gasometer houses. In fact any small leak from an enclosed gas holder created a potentially explosive build-up of air and gas within the enclosing house, presenting a far greater danger than the original leak did; putting houses around gas holders was discontinued in the UK. In the United States, however, where gas needed to be protected from much more extreme weather, gasometer houses continued to be built and were architecturally decorative.

The telescopic gas holder was first invented in 1824. The cup and dip (grip) seal was patented by Hutchinson in 1833, and the first working example was built in Leeds. Gas holders were then built all around the UK in great numbers starting in the 1850s. The first were the two-lift column-supported type; later ones had four lifts and were frame-guided, and they could be retrofitted with an additional flying lift. The large gas holders at Kings Cross, London, were built in the 1860s.

William Gadd of Gadd & Mason in Manchester invented the spirally guided gas holder in 1890. Instead of external columns or guide frames, his design operated with spiral rails. The first commercial design was built in Northwich, Cheshire, in the same year. By the end of the 19th century most towns in Britain had their own gas works and gas holders.

The years between the two world wars were marked by improvements in storage, especially the waterless gas holder, and in distribution, with the advent of 2-to-4-inch (50 to 100 mm) steel pipes to convey gas at up to 50 psi (340 kPa) as feeder mains to the traditional cast iron pipes. Municipal gas works became superfluous in the later 20th century, but gas holders and production plants were still in use in steel works in 2016.

== Function ==
A gas holder provides storage for purified, metered gas. It acts as a buffer, removing the need for continuous gas production. The weight of the gas holder lift (cap) controlled the pressure of the gas in the mains and provided back pressure for the gas-making plant.

They are the only storage method that keeps gas at district pressure (the pressure required in local gas mains).

== Types ==
There are two basic types of gas holder: the water-sealed and the rigid waterless.

The water-sealed gas holder consists of a tank of water that rises and falls to take the gas. A watered gas holder consisted of two parts: a deep tank of water used to provide a seal, and a closed vessel (the lift) that rises above the water as the gas volume increased.

Rigid waterless gas holders were a very early design that neither expanded or contracted. There are modern versions of the waterless gas holder, e.g. oil-sealed, grease-sealed and "dry seal" (membrane) types. They consist of a fixed cylinder capped by a moving piston.

=== Water-sealed gas holders ===
Gas holder schematic

The tank with an internal cone, or dumpling

The earliest Boulton and Watt gas holders had a single lift. The tank was above ground and was lined with wood; the lift was guided by tripods and cables. Pulleys and weights were supplied to regulate the gas pressure. Brick tanks were introduced in 1818, when a gas holder could have a capacity of 20,000 cubic feet (570 m^{3}). The engineer John Malam devised a tank with a central rod-and-tube guide system.

Telescoping holders fall into two subcategories. The earlier of the telescoping variety were column-guided variations and were built starting in 1824. To guide the telescoping walls, or "lifts", they have an external frame, visible at a fixed height at all times. A refinement was the guide frame gas holder, where the heavy columns were replaced by a lighter and more extensive framework. Vertical girders (standards) were intersected by horizontal girders and cross-braced. This could be bolted onto an underground or above-ground tank. The Cutler patented guide frame dispensed with the horizontal girders, using diagonal triangulated framing instead. Cable-guided gas holders, invented by Pease in 1880, had a limited use, but were useful on unstable ground where the rigid systems could buckle and jam the lift.

Spiral-guided gas holders were built in the UK from 1890 until 1983. These have no frame, and each lift is guided by the one below, rotating as it goes up as dictated by helical runners.

Both telescoping types use the manometric property of water to provide a seal. The whole tank floats in a circular or annular water reservoir, held up by the roughly constant pressure of a varying volume of gas, the pressure determined by the weight of the structure, and the water providing the seal for the gas within the moving walls. Besides storing the gas, the tank's design serves to establish the pressure of the gas system. With telescoping (multiple-lift) tanks, the innermost tank has an approximately 1 ft × 2 ft (30 cm × 61 cm) lip around the outside of the bottom edge, called a cup, which picks up water as it rises above the reservoir water level. This immediately engages a downward lip on the inner rim of the next outer lift, called a dip or grip, and as this grip sinks into the cup, it preserves the water seal as the inner tank continues to rise until the grip grounds on the cup, whereupon further injection of gas will start to raise that lift as well. Holders were built with as many as four lifts. An extra flying lift could be retrofitted into column or frame gas holders. This was an additional inner tank that extended above the standards, when the infrastructure would support the extra shear forces and weight. Though not exclusively, spiral guides were used.

A two-lift telescopic gas holder, half raised

When the lift is engaged, it carries up with it a gas-tight seal of water.

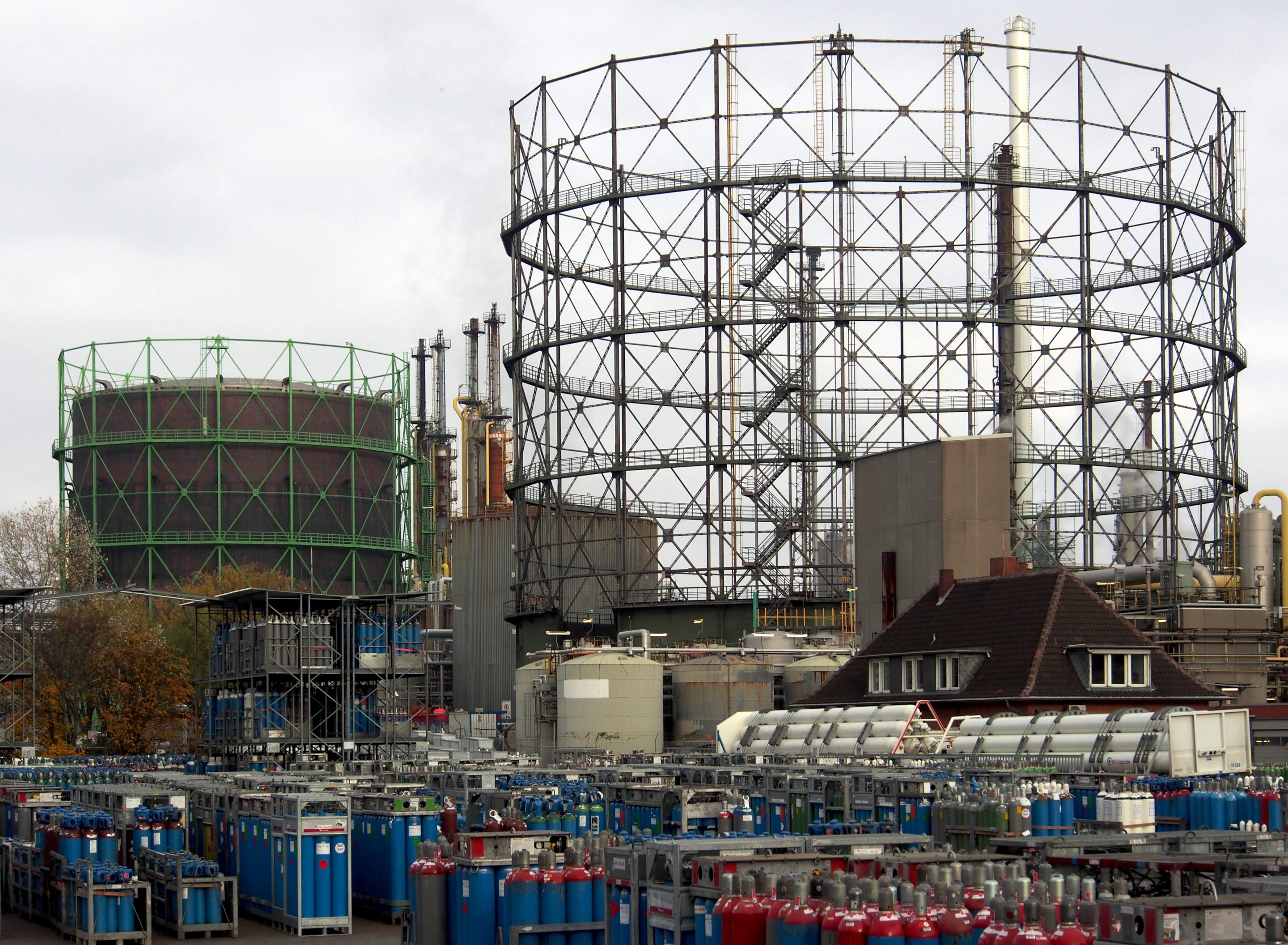
Two column-guided gas holders at BASF, Germany

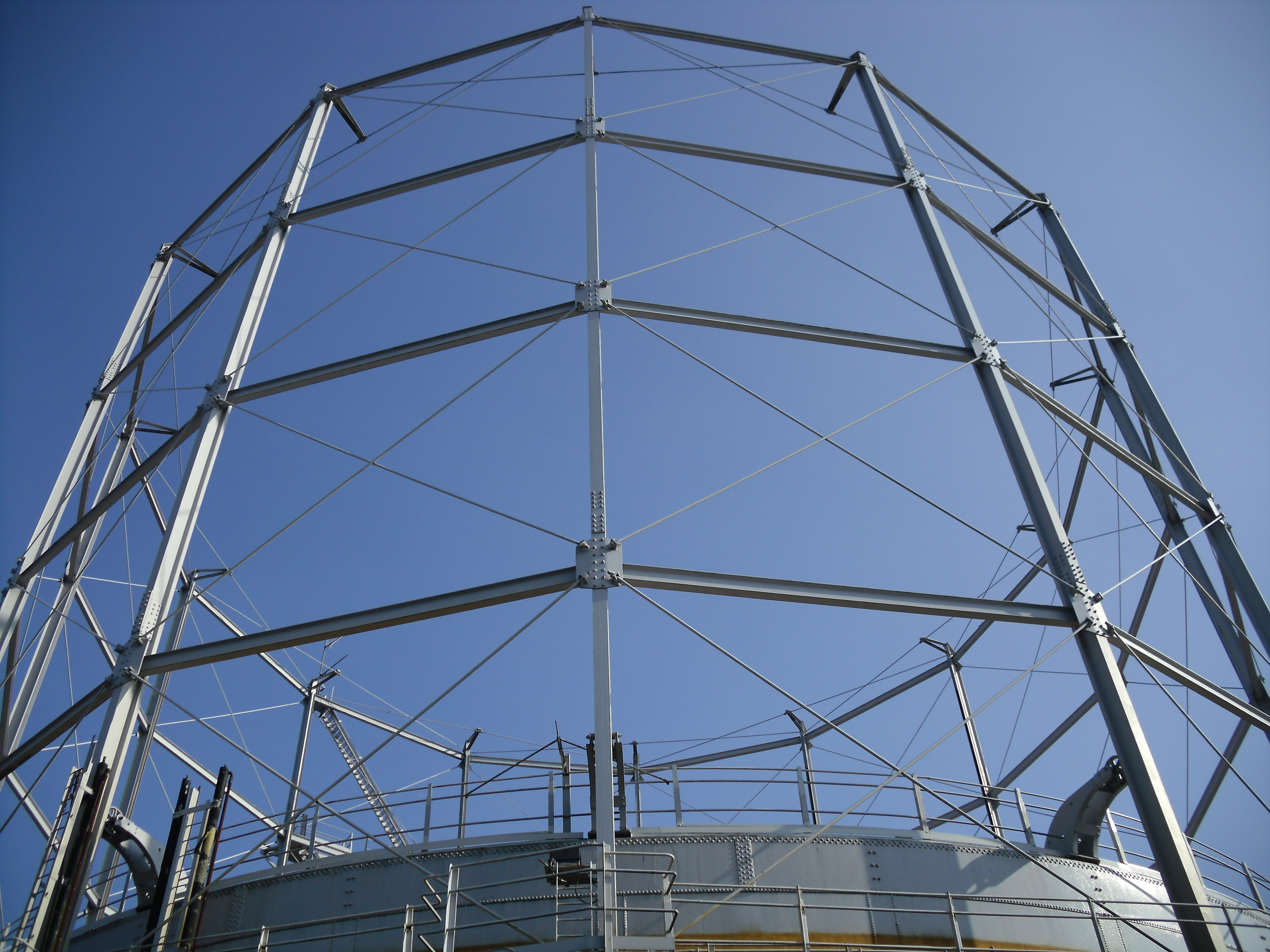
Gas holder at Cross Gates, Leeds, first of a former twin holder station built around 1900

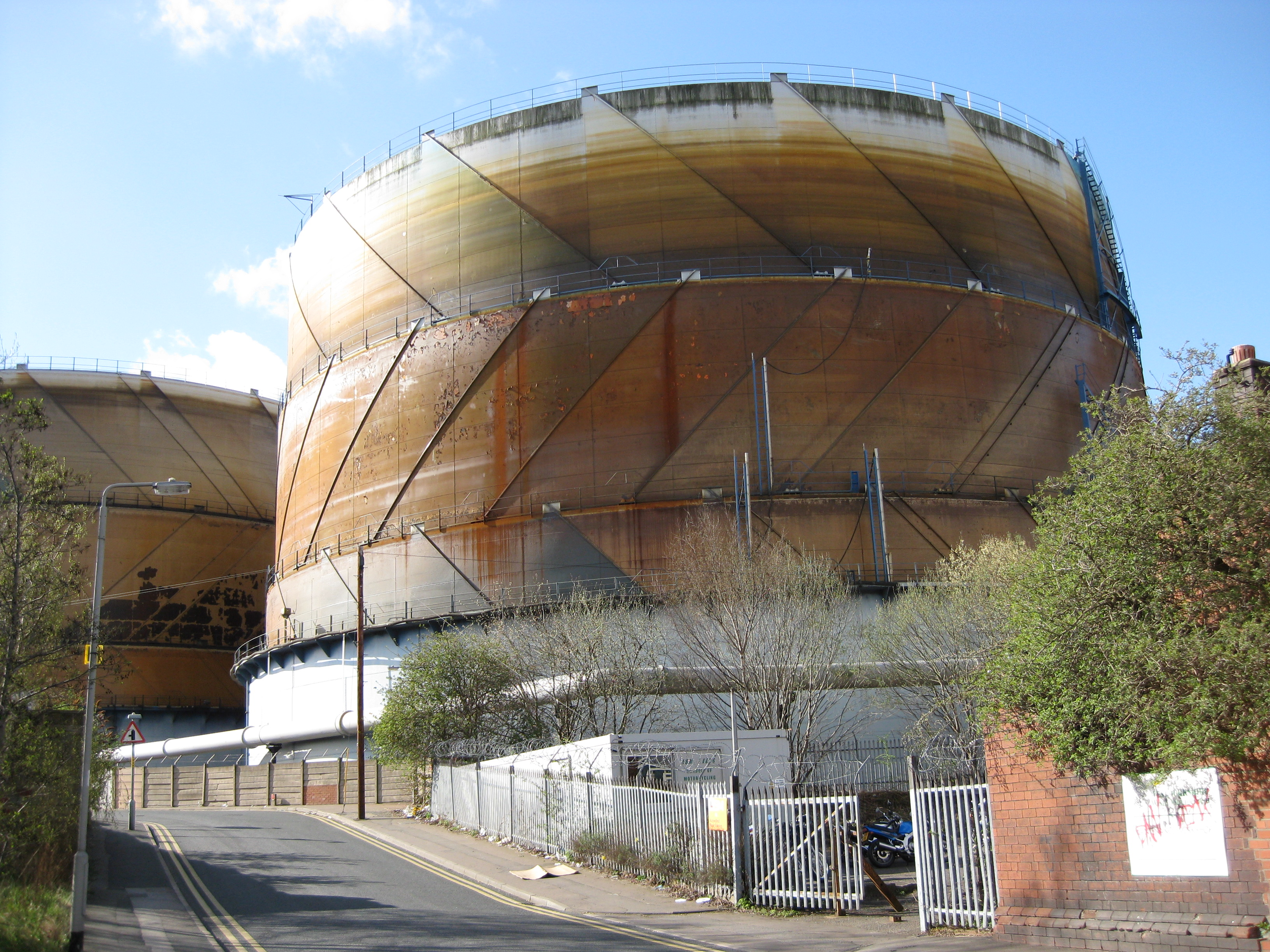
Spiral-guided gas holders at the former Meadow Lane Gas Works in Hunslet, Leeds. These were constructed around 1965.

=== Dry-seal-type gas holder ===
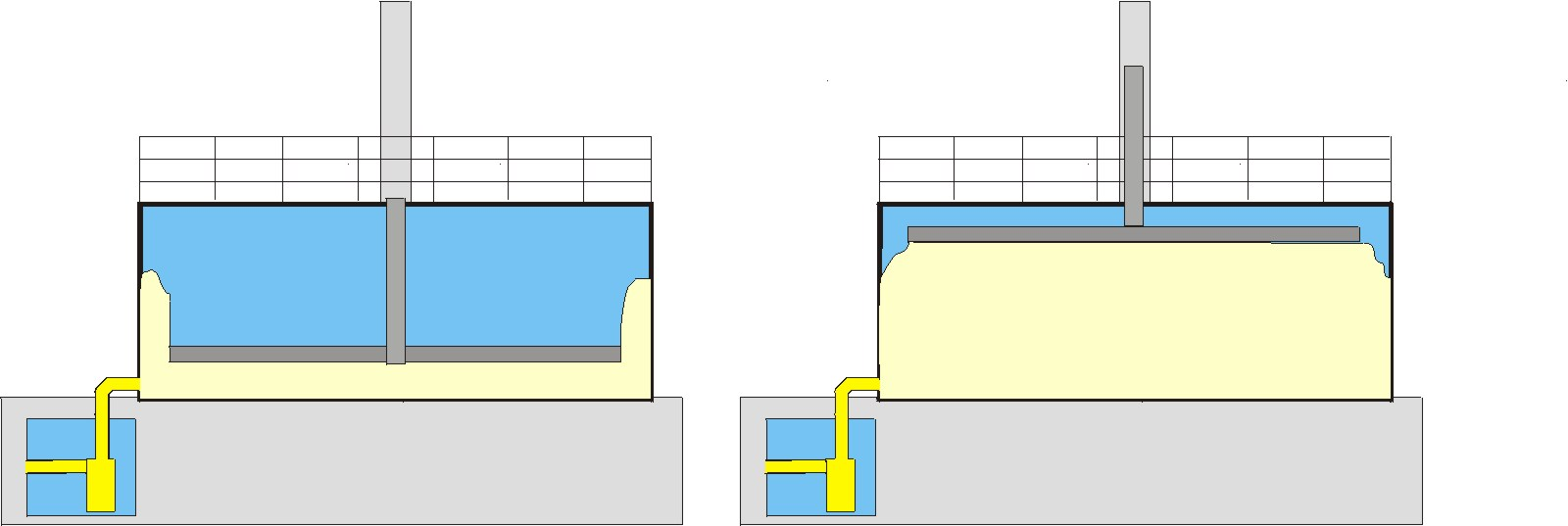
A dry-seal Wiggins-type gas holder

Dry-seal gas holders have a static cylindrical shell, within which a piston rises and falls. As it moves, a grease seal, tar/oil seal or a sealing membrane which is rolled out and in from the piston keeps the gas from escaping. The MAN type (by Maschinenfabrik Augsburg-Nürnberg AG) was introduced in 1915: it was polygonal and used a tar/oil seal. The Klonne dry seal gas holder was circular and used a grease seal. The dry-seal Wiggins gasholder was patented in 1952: it used a flexible curtain that was suspended from the piston. The largest low-pressure gas holder built was the Klonne gas holder built in 1938 in Gelsenkirchen. It was 147 metres (482 ft) high and 80 metres (260 ft) in diameter, which gave it a capacity of 594,000 cubic metres (21,000,000 ft^{3}). There was a MAN type, built in 1934 in Chicago with a capacity of 566,000 cubic metres (20,000,000 ft^{3}).

== By location ==
=== Europe ===
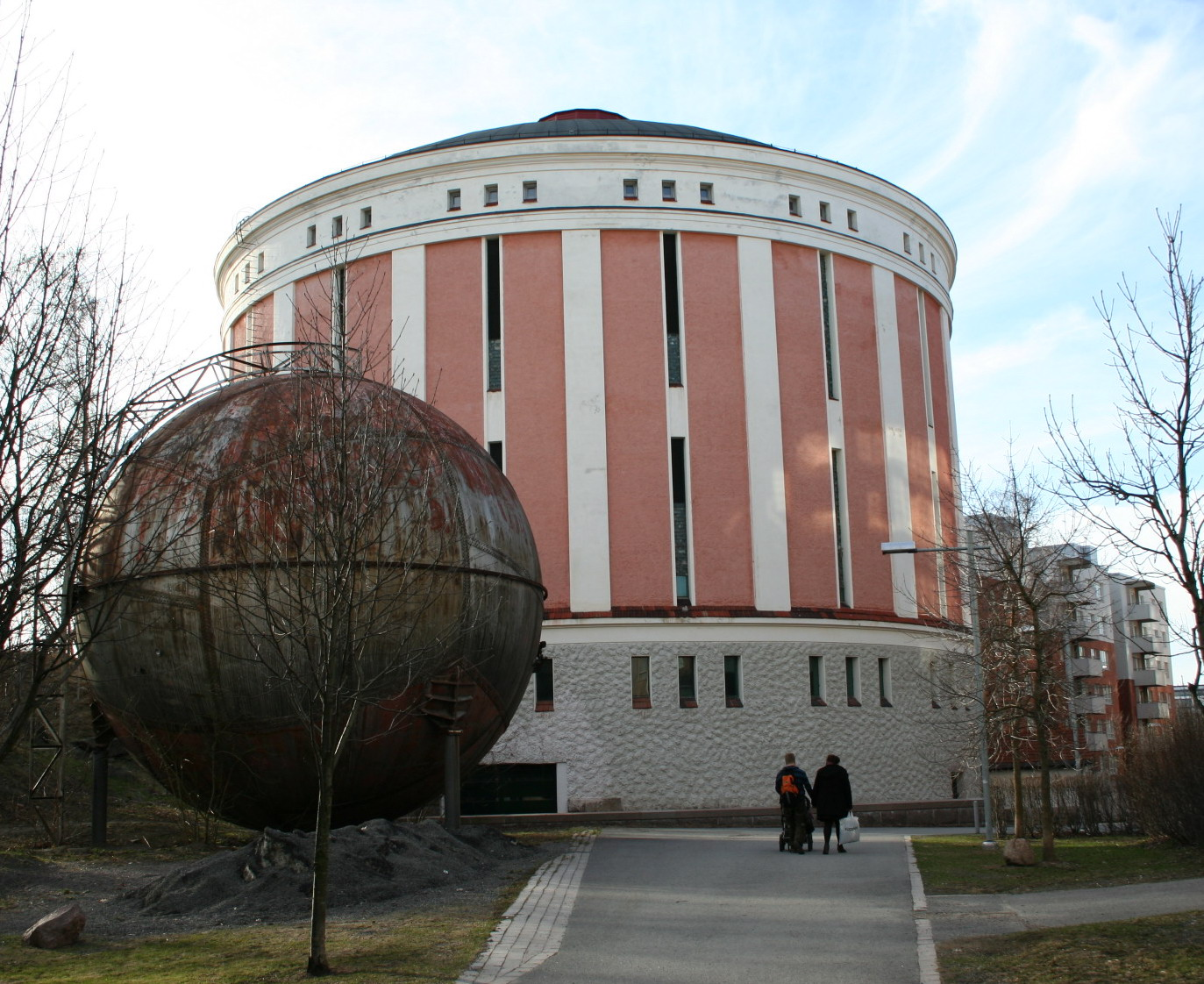
A gas holder from 1912, located in Turku, Finland

In the past, holder stations would have an operator living on site controlling their movement. However, with the process control systems now used on these sites, such an operator is obsolete. The tallest gasometer in Europe is 117 metres (384 ft) tall and is located in Oberhausen.

The pollution associated with gasworks and gas storage makes the land difficult to reclaim for other purposes, but some gas holders, such as the Vienna Gasometers, have been converted into other uses such as living space and a shopping mall and historical archives for the city. Many sites, however, were never used for the production of 'town gas', so the land contamination is relatively low.

A gasworks in South Lotts, Dublin, Ireland, was converted into apartments.

The gas holder in Amsterdam has hosted the Awakenings techno parties.

==== Great Britain ====
Gas holders have been a major part of the skylines of low-rise British cities for up to 200 years, due to their large distinctive shape and central location. They were originally used for balancing daily demand and generation of town gas. With the move to natural gas and construction of the national grid pipework, their use steadily diminished as the pipe network could both store gas under pressure, and eventually satisfy peak demand directly. London, Manchester, Sheffield, Birmingham, Leeds, Newcastle, Salisbury, and Glasgow (which has the largest gasometers in the UK) are noted for having many gas holders.

Some of these gas holders have become listed buildings. The gas holders behind King's Cross station in London were specially dismantled when the new Channel Tunnel Rail Link was being created, with Gas holder No 8 being re-erected on a nearby site behind St Pancras station as part of a housing development. It has been fashioned into a park. Most gas holders are no longer used, and a program of dismantling is underway to release the land for reuse.

One of the largest remaining groups of gas holders is at Bromley-by-Bow in East London, believed to be the largest in Europe.

In the UK as well as other European countries, a movement to preserve classic gasometers has emerged in recent years, especially after Britain's National Grid announced in 2013 their plans to remove 76 gas holders, and soon afterwards, Southern and Scottish Gas networks announced that they would demolish 111 others. Christopher Costelloe, director of the Victorian Society, a leader in the campaign to preserve gasometers, has said that "Gasometers, by their very size and structure, cannot help but become landmarks. [They] are singularly dramatic structures for all their emptiness."

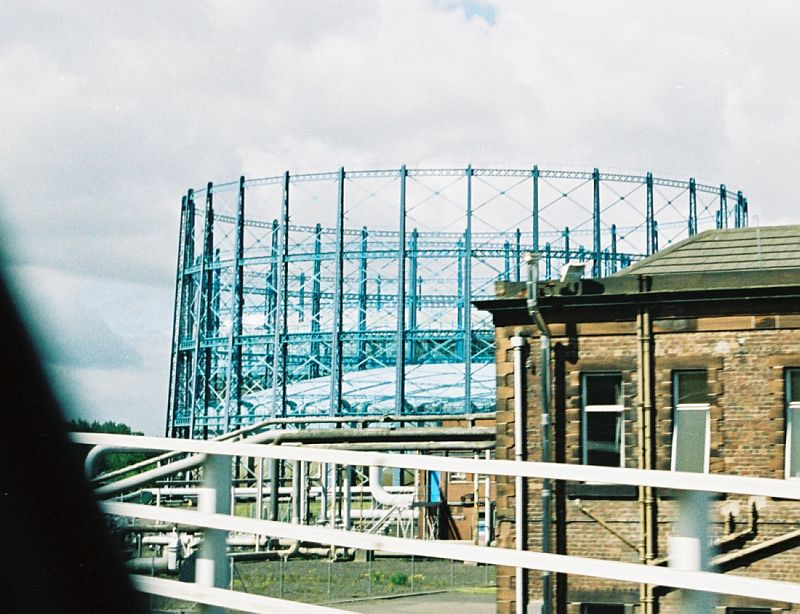
The gas holders of Provan Gas Works, on the skyline in Glasgow; pipework and the booster house can also be seen.

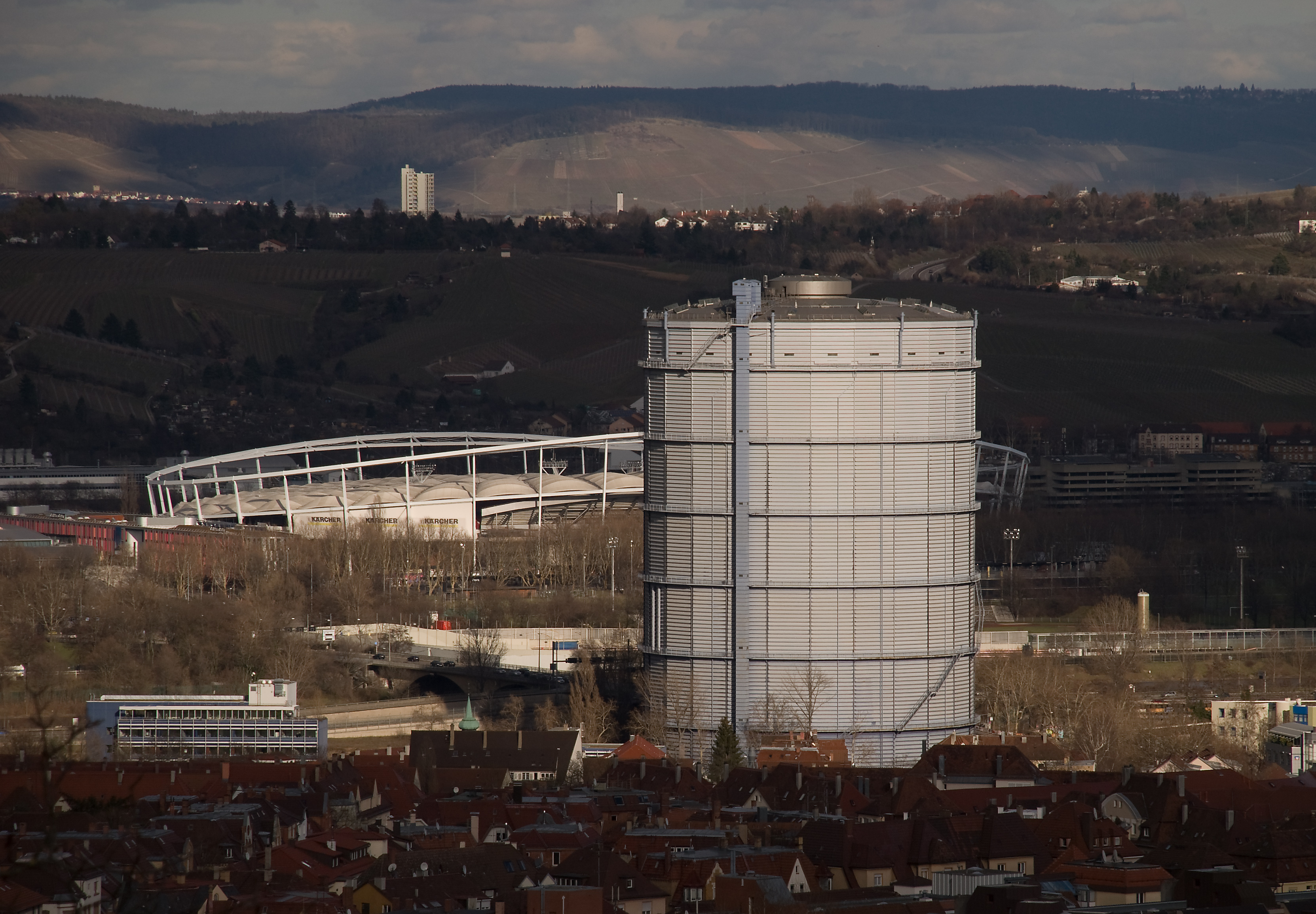
Gasometer of the MAN type in Stuttgart, Germany

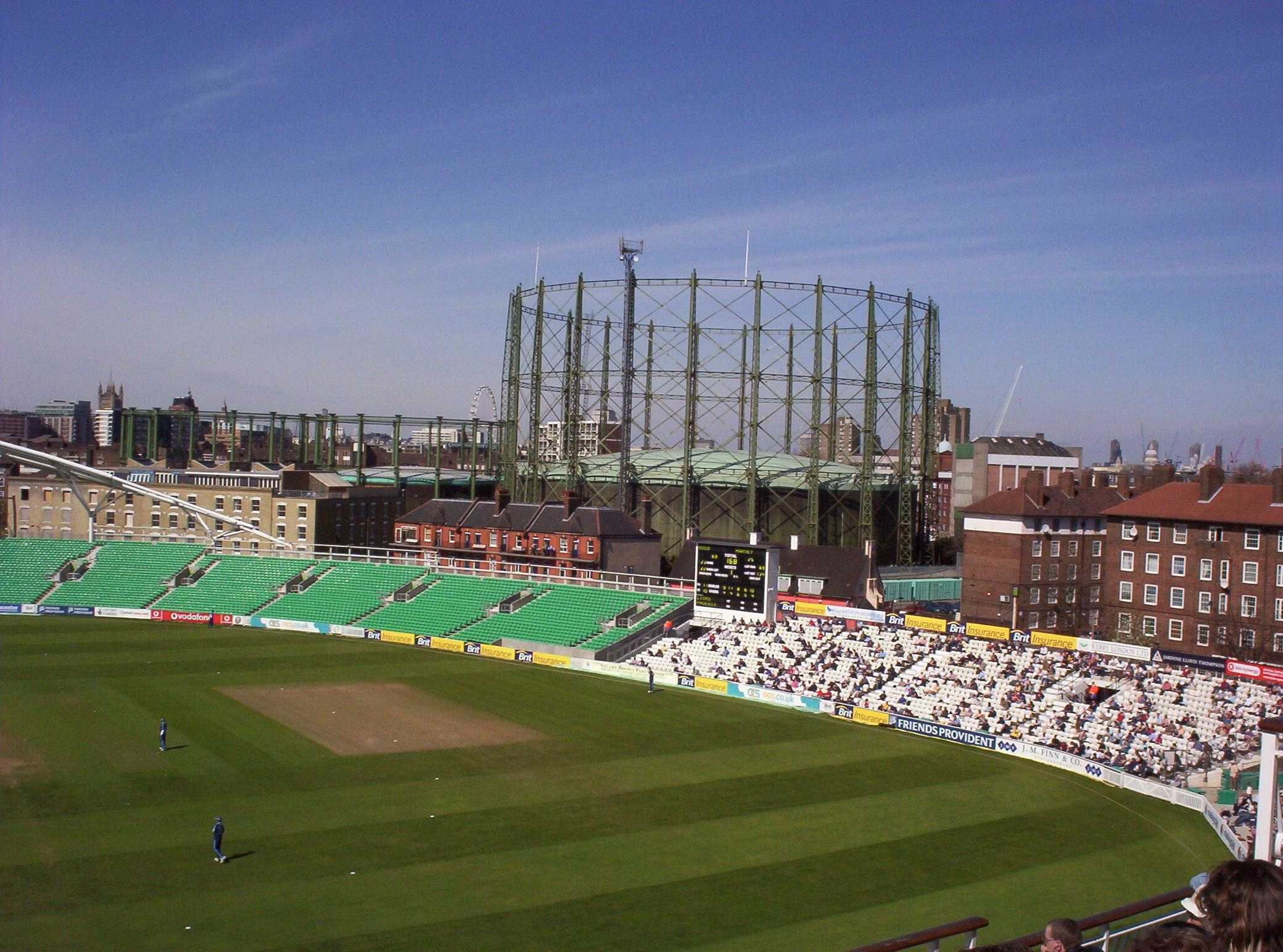
The Oval Gasholders just outside The Oval cricket ground in London

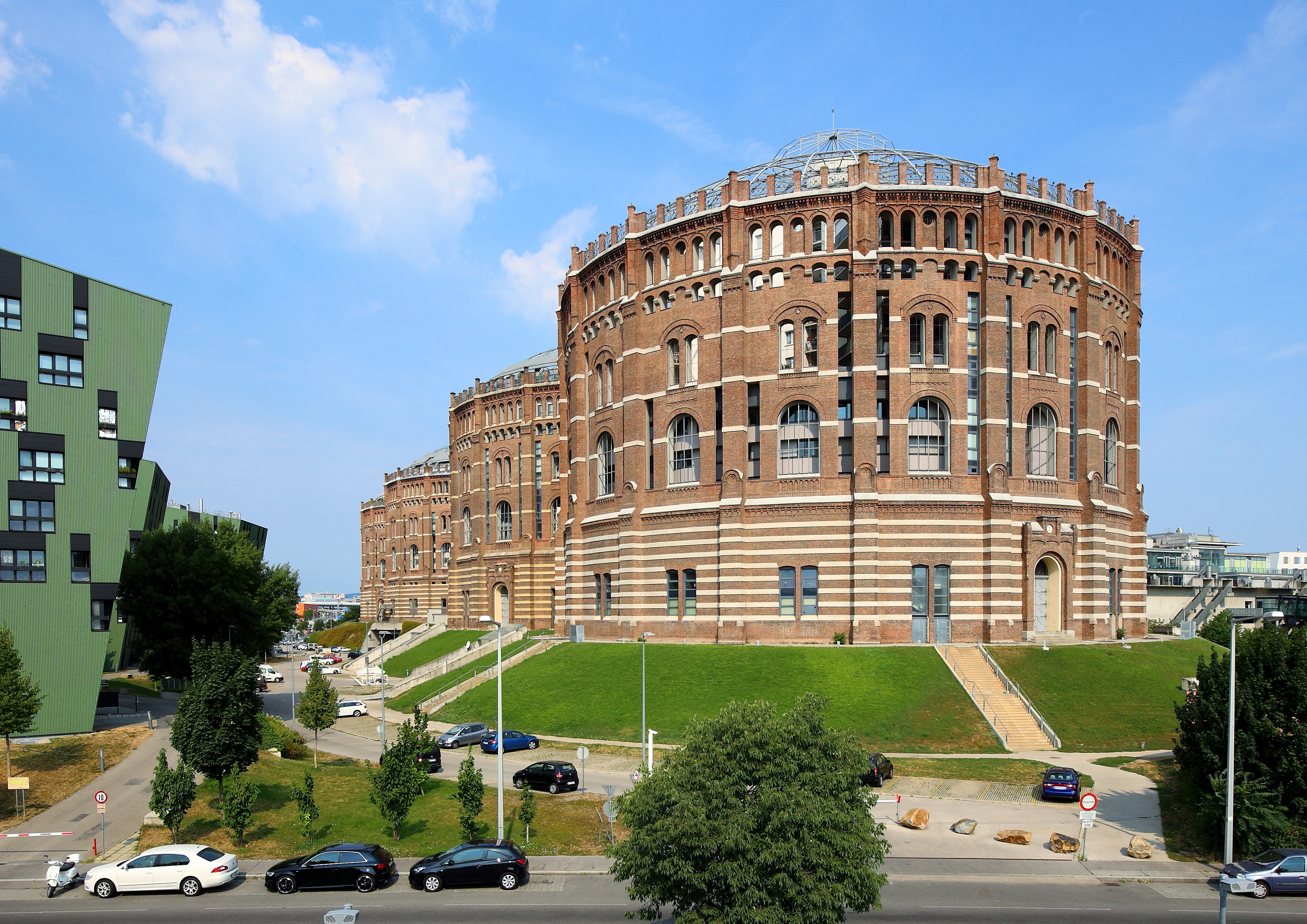
Vienna Gasometers, converted for residential and commercial use

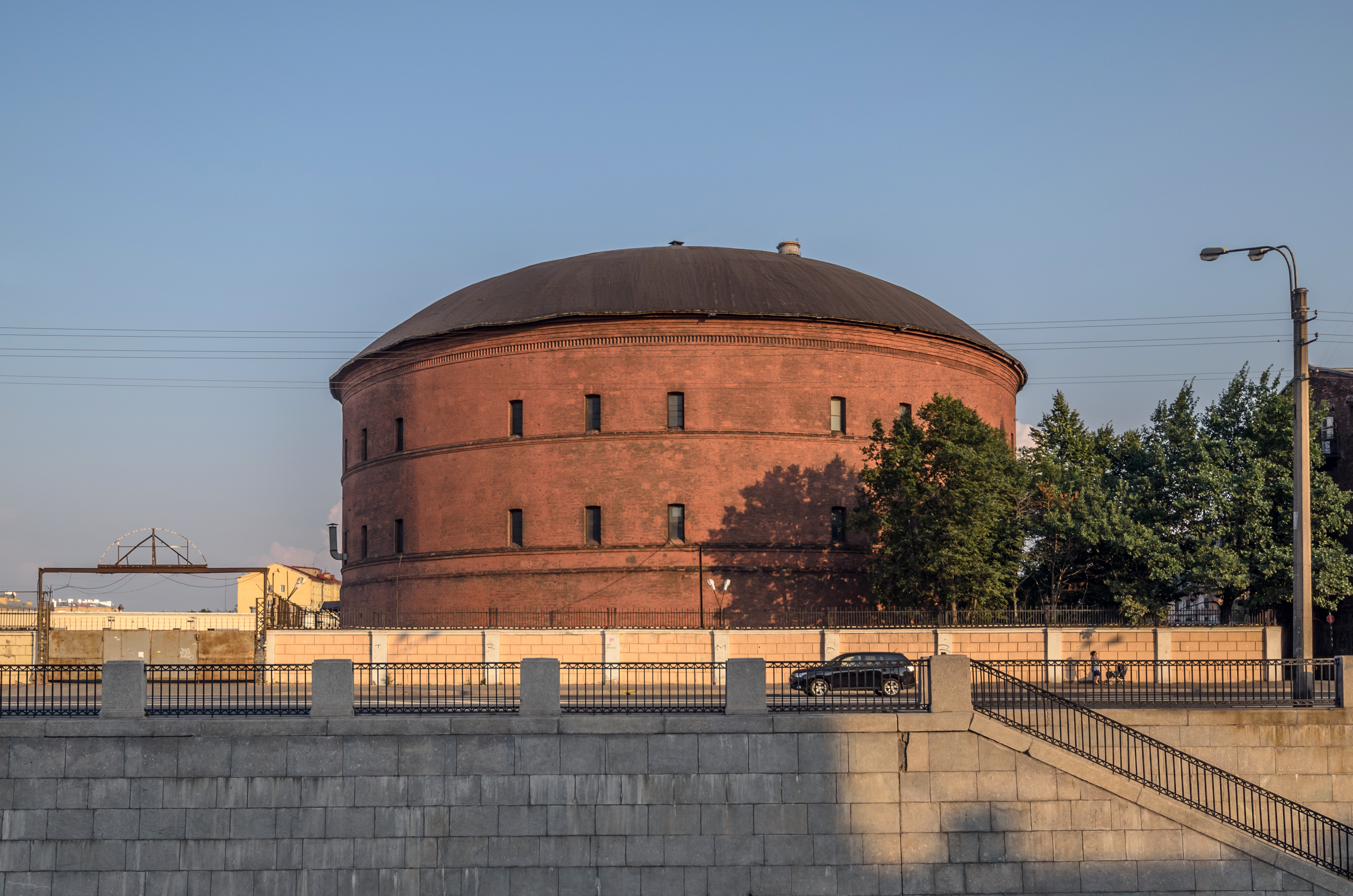
Gas holder in Saint Petersburg, Russia, converted to a planetarium

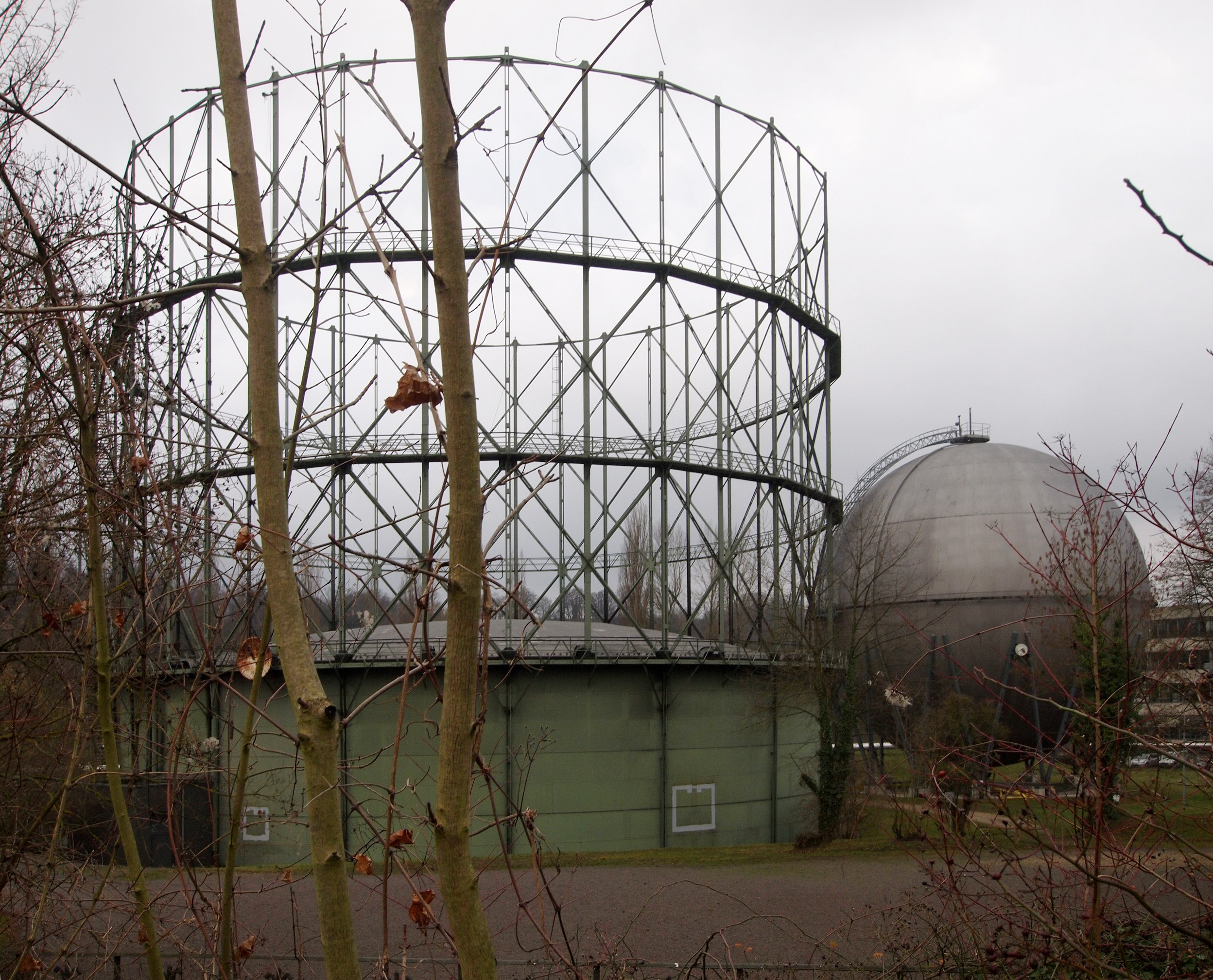
Decommissioned gas holder next to a spherical gas tank in Pforzheim, Germany

=== United States ===
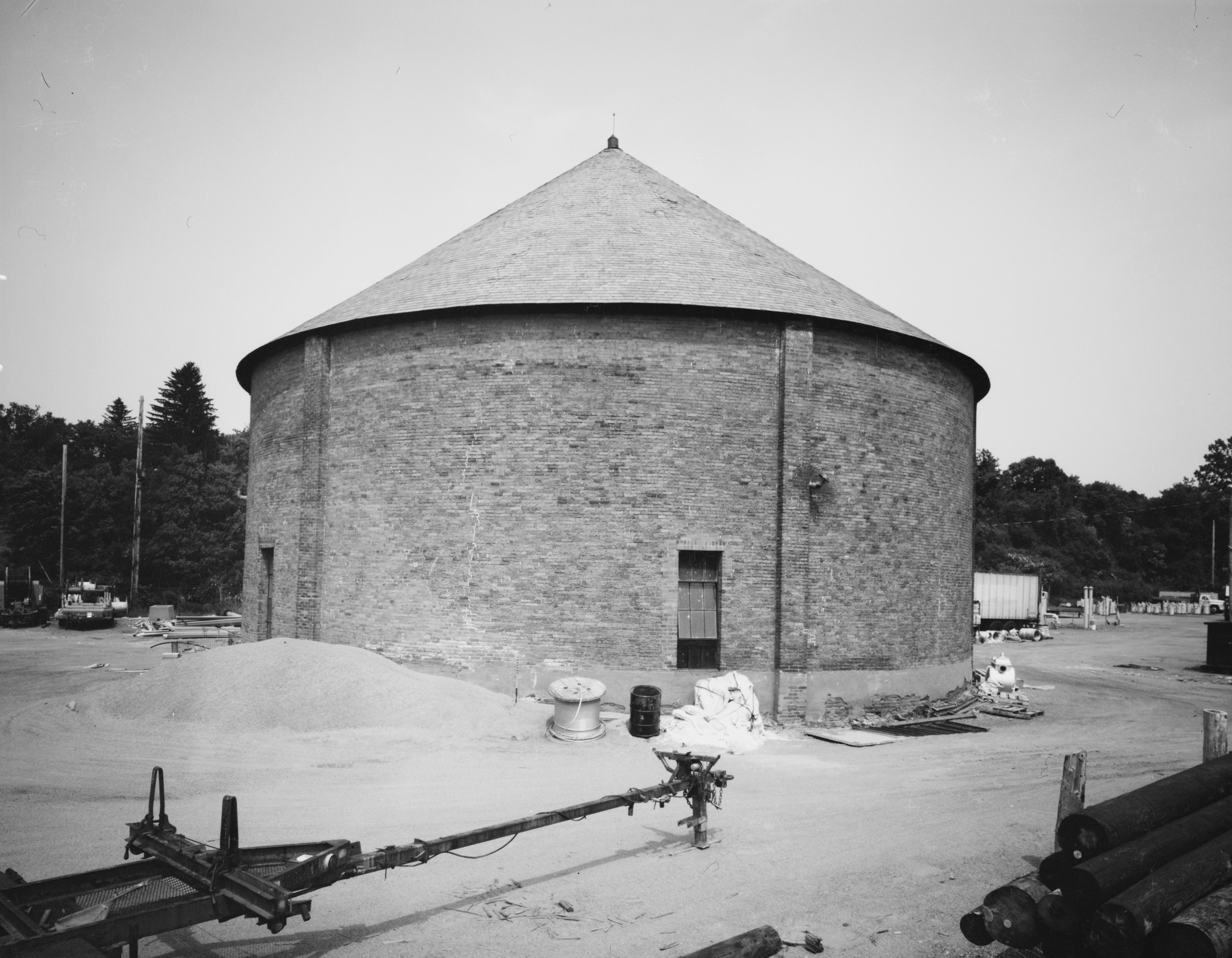
Rare extant 19th-century gasholder house at the Saratoga Gas, Electric Light and Power Company Complex in Saratoga Springs, New York

Gasometers are now comparatively rare in the US (where they were usually called gas holders); although hundreds were built between the 1870s and 1950s, many of those have since been demolished. The largest US-based builder of gas holders, the Baltimore-based Bartlett-Hayward Company (since 1927 a division of Koppers), built 600 of them from the 1870s up through 1941, when a monograph on the history of the company was published. They were built in nearly every US state, as well as elsewhere in North America, South America, and South Africa. Those 600, of both water tank type (541 units) and waterless type (59 units), held a combined capacity of 1.1 billion cubic feet (10^{9}). Latrobe's chapters that deal with B.H.'s gas holder business line provide additional details that are useful to readers interested in the US gas industry's history.

A general pattern of development in the US gas industry was that from the 1870s through the 1940s, gas manufacturing plants were common in many locales, producing both coal gas and water gas, and in the second half of the 20th century, the rise of natural gas distribution via gas pipelines supplanted that system and the existing gas holders were used (in a less crucial capacity) for managing the pressure of the natural gas pipelines, until the holders reached the end of their useful lifespan.

Several gas holders were erected in St. Louis by the Laclede Gas Light Company in the early 20th century. These gasometers remained in use until the first decade of the 21st century, when the last one was decommissioned and abandoned in place. The most recently used gasometer in the United States was on the southeast side of Indianapolis, but it has been demolished along with the adjoining Citizens Energy Group coke plant. Another pair of holders at the Newtown Holder Station, in Elmhurst, Queens, in New York City, was a popular landmark for traffic reporters until they were demolished in 1996 and became Elmhurst Park. The demolition of two larger "Maspeth Tanks" in nearby Greenpoint, Brooklyn, was described by The New York Times at length.

Of the waterless type (MAN type), the first extremely large one by B.H. was the one at the River Rouge Plant of the Ford Motor Company, built in 1935. Another large MAN-type gas holder was erected just east of Baltimore, Maryland, by B.H. in 1949 and operated by Baltimore Gas and Electric for 32 years. The 307-foot-tall (94 m), 170-foot-diameter (52 m) structure, which could hold 7 million cubic feet (200,000 m^{3}), was a landmark due to its unusual marking scheme, which had a red-and-white checkerboard pattern from 200 feet (61 m) up. The structure was demolished in July 1984.

Approximately a dozen brick or concrete structures built in the latter half of the 19th-century to house gas holders, known as gasholder houses, still exist in the United States. The Troy Gas Light Company structure in Troy, New York, is one of the largest remaining examples. As of early 2021, efforts were under way to save the Concord Gas Light Company Gasholder House in Concord, New Hampshire. It is unusual because the inner workings of the structure, including the cap, are still in place.

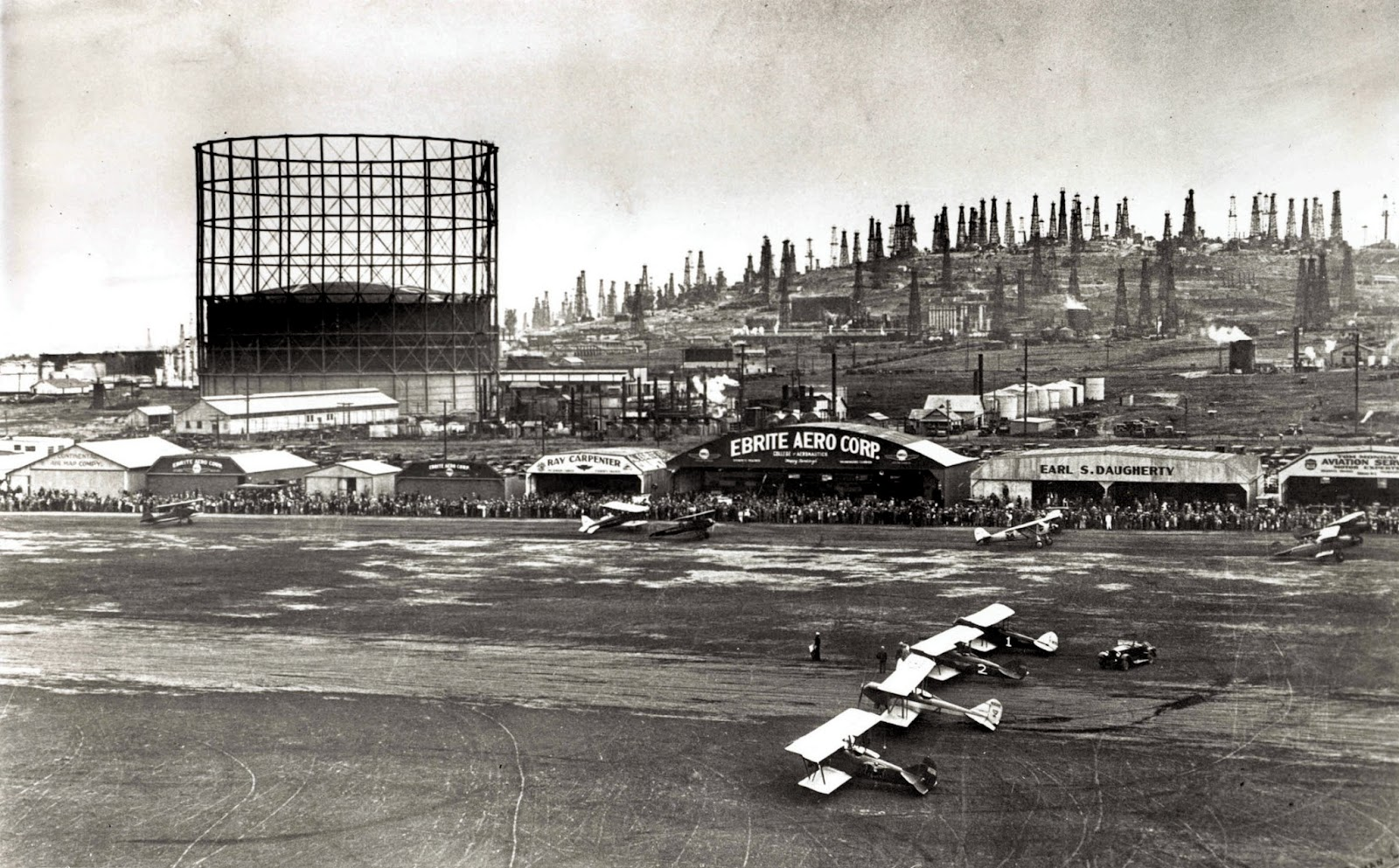
Gas holder near Long Beach Airport, California, 1920s

PG&E operated gas holders at its gasification plants in California before natural gas pipelines were built. The San Francisco Beach Street Plant was built in 1899. The gas plant operated until 1931, but its associated gas holder was used with natural gas into the 1950s, when the property was redeveloped. Gas holders also previously existed at Chico (demolished 1951), Daly City, Eureka, Fresno, Long Beach (1927–1997), Los Angeles, including two within sight of City Hall Merced, Monterey, Oakland, Redding (gas holder demolished early 1960s), Redwood City (gas holder built early 1900s, demolished 1959), Salinas, San Francisco Potrero Plant, Santa Rosa, St. Helena, Stockton, Vallejo, Willows; and likely existed at their other gasification plants in Colusa, Hollister, Lodi, Madera, Marysville, Modesto, Napa, Oakdale, Oroville, Red Bluff, Sacramento, San Luis Obispo, Santa Cruz, Selma, Tracy, Turlock, Watsonville and Woodland.

=== Australia ===
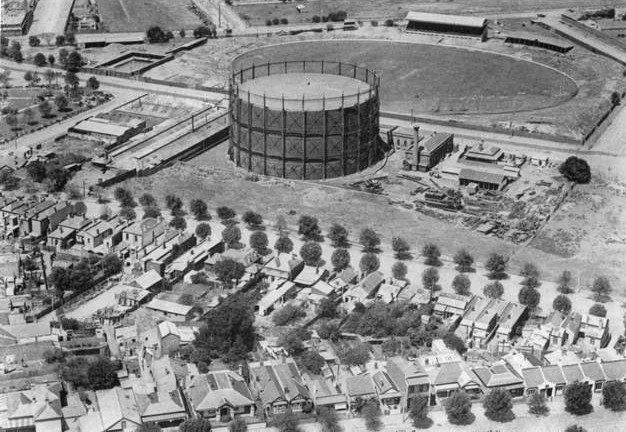
Gasometer and Arden St Oval, North Melbourne, in 1928

Gas holders, though once common, have become rare in Australia. Most gasworks within the country were demolished or repurposed, and few gasometers remain because of this. A good example of a largely intact gasometer is located at the Launceston Gasworks site in Tasmania. Though the gas bell has been removed, all other components are intact. The remains of two older 1860s gasometers are also visible on site but only the foundations remain. In Sydney a beautiful ornate gasometer frame can be seen from the platform of the Macdonaldtown railway station which was built above the access tunnels of the adjoining gasworks site.

In Queensland, the Gasworks Newstead is a commercial, residential, and retail development adjoining the river at Newstead, Brisbane, opening in 2013, built around a now heritage-listed 1887 gas holder. Only the frame remains, inside of which is a plaza used as a public recreation zone and for occasional special events such as markets or concerts. At dusk each day a dynamic lighting display illuminates the frame. The former industrial site on the inner-city fringe became an urban renewal zone for upmarket housing centred on the Gasworks zone.

For many years, a huge gas holder towered over the Arden Street Oval, the home ground of the North Melbourne Football Club in the Victorian Football League. Television coverage of Australian Rules football matches played at the famous ground showed the gas holder dominating the landscape. It was demolished in late 1977 to early 1978.

=== Argentina ===
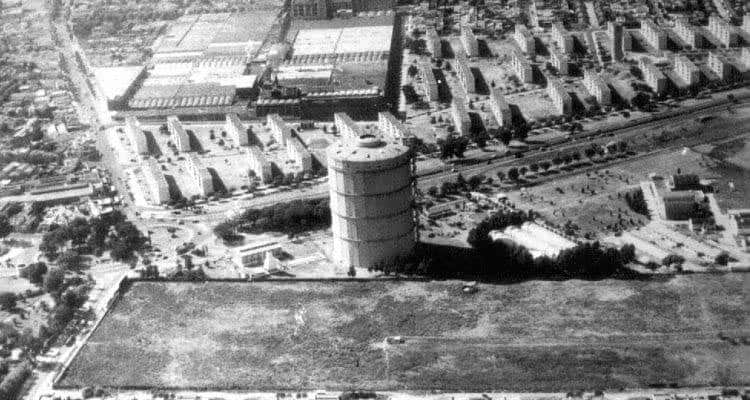
Gas holder, Buenos Aires, Argentina

Gas del Estado owned and operated a gasometer in Villa Maipú, Partido de San Martín, Argentina. Built in 1948 by MAN, it was used to store coke gas produced by Usina Corrales, a factory nearby. It is 85 metres (279 ft) high and 54 metres (177 ft) wide and was operated for only 6 years until it was decommissioned in 1954. It is currently owned by Gas Natural Fenosa.

== Other storage systems ==
Most gas is stored in large underground reservoirs such as salt caverns. For short-term local storage, line-packing is the preferred method.

Throughout the 1960s and 1970s it was thought that gas holders could be replaced with high-pressure bullets (a cylindrical pressure vessel with hemispherical ends). However, regulations brought in meant that all new bullets must be built several miles out of towns and cities, and the security of storing large amounts of high-pressure natural gas above ground made them unpopular with local people and councils. Bullets are gradually being decommissioned. It is also possible to store natural gas in liquid form, and this is widely practised throughout the world.

== See also ==
- Gasometer Oberhausen
- Gashouse District
- Natural gas storage
- Gasholder house
- Water tower, similar utility storage structures
- Gasværket – a theatre in Copenhagen which was formerly a huge gas holder
