= Tasmanian media =

The Australian state of Tasmania has several newspapers, magazines and television stations local to the island, and has historically had a strong mass media production environment.

== History ==
=== Colonial era ===
Early media started in the state with the Van Diemen's Land Gazette (1810), followed by the Hobart Town Gazette in 1816. In 1824, Edition 422 of the Hobart Town Gazette, Andrew Bent published without government censorship, being the first on the continent to do so. This established Australia's first independent, uncensored press and would pave the way for future media across the country.

This period saw the rise of influential regional and political voices like the Colonial Times (1825), the Launceston Examiner (1842), and Hobart's The Mercury (founded in 1854 by John Davies).

== Magazines ==
- Tasmania 40° South
- Island Magazine
- The Hobart Magazine

== Digital Media ==
Tasmania has two major digital news outlets, three minor ones & four regional platforms.

=== Major outlets ===
- Pulse Tasmania
- ABC News Hobart/ABC News Northern Tasmania

=== Minor outlets ===
- Tasmanian Times
- Tasmanian Inquirer
- Slam! News

=== Regional outlets ===
- The Launceston News & The North West Coast News are published by News Corp, the owner of The Mercury (Hobart).
- New Norfolk & Derwent Valley News
- News of the Midlands
- The North & Coast Post

== Newspapers ==
Tasmania has three major & one minor paper.

- The Mercury – Greater Hobart Area
- The Examiner – Greater Launceston Area
- The Advocate – North-West Tasmania
- The Advertiser - North-East Tasmania

In addition, a number of regional newspapers are published in Tasmania. Font Publishing produces five papers in the South-East, Derwent Valley and King Island, Corporate Communications produces three papers in Hobart and surrounds, and Yeates Media produces three papers in Kingston, Huonville and Circular Head. other independent publishers are scattered across remote areas of the state. The West Coast Echo services Zeehan, Strahan and Queenstown. The Bruny Island Community Association produces their own Bruny News, while the Flinder's Islands news service is provided by the local council.

== Television ==
Tasmania has five broadcast television stations:

- ABC Television Tasmania (ABT)
- SBS Television Tasmania (SBS)
- Seven Tasmania (TNT)
- WIN Television Tasmania (TVT) – Nine Network affiliate
- 10 Tasmania (TDT) – Network 10 affiliate

== Radio ==
Tasmania has a wide range of radio stations. Hobart and Launceston both have a range of local, which collectively broadcast coverage to most of the island. Tasmania's first radio station was 7ZL was founded in the Mercury Building, Hobart in 1927, while Launceston's first station, 7LA, began to broadcast in 1930. 7ZL became part of the Australian Broadcasting Corporation upon its establishment. In 1930, 7HOFM began to broadcast, as Hobart's first commercial radio station. Today, all of Tasmania's commercial radio stations are owned by either ARN Regional or Southern Cross Austereo.

Major radio stations in Tasmania include

Southern Tasmania

- ABC Radio Hobart (936 kHZ)
- Ultra106five (106.5 MHz)
- Triple M Hobart (107.3 MHz)
- Hit 100.9 (100.9 MHz)
- 7HOFM (101.7 MHz)
- Hobart FM (96.1 MHz)

Northern Tasmania

- Sea FM (101.7 FM) – Burnie
- Sea FM (107.7 FM) – Devonport
- 89.3 LAFM (89.3 MHz) & 90.1 Chilli FM (90.1MHz)
- ABC Northern Tasmania (91.7 MHz)
