= List of radio station callsigns in Tasmania =

The following is a list of Australian radio station callsigns beginning with the number 7, indicating radio stations in the state of Tasmania.

Callsign	Area served	Frequency	Band	On-air ID	Purpose	Site
7ABCFM	Tasmania	various	FM	ABC Classic	National	
7ABCRN	Tasmania	various	FM	Radio National	National	
7ABCRR	Tasmania	various	FM	ABC Local Radio	National	
7AD	Devonport	098.9	FM	7AD	Commercial	
7AUS	Queenstown	095.3	FM	KIX Country	Commercial	
7BOD	Break O'Day	093.7, 98.5 & 100.3	FM	Star FM	Community	
7BU	Burnie	0100.9	FM	7BU	Commercial	
7DBS	Wynyard	106.1	FM	Coast FM	Community	
7DDD	Devonport	107.7	FM	Sea FM	Commercial	
7EDG	Hobart	099.3	FM	Edge Radio	Community	
7EXX	Launceston	090.1	FM	90.1 Chilli FM	Commercial	
7FG	Fingal	1161	AM	ABC Northern Tasmania	National	
7HFC	Hobart	106.5	FM	ultra106five	Community	
7HHO	Hobart	101.7	FM	7HO	Commercial	
7JJJ	Tasmania	various	FM	Triple J	National	
7LAA	Launceston	089.3	FM	89.3 LAFM	Commercial	
7LTN	Launceston	103.7	FM	City Park Radio	Community	
7MID	Oatlands	097.1	FM	Mid FM	Community	
7NT	North Eastern Tasmania	091.7	FM	ABC Northern Tasmania	National	
7PB	Tasmania	various	AM	ABC NewsRadio	National	
7PNN	Tasmania	various	FM	ABC NewsRadio	National	
7QN	Queenstown	090.5	FM	ABC Northern Tasmania	National	
7RGS	Scottsdale	099.7	FM	Sea FM	Commercial	
7RGY	Huon Valley	098.5	FM	Huon FM	Community	
7RN	Tasmania	various	AM	Radio National	National	
7RPH	Hobart	0864	AM	RPH	Community	
7SBSFM	Hobart	105.7	FM	SBS Radio	National	
7SD	Scottsdale	0540	AM	7SD	Commercial	
7SEA	Burnie	101.7	FM	Sea FM	Commercial	
7SH	St. Helens	1584	AM	ABC Northern Tasmania	National	
7TAS	Tasman Peninsula	097.7	FM	Tasman FM	Community	
7TFM	George Town	095.3	FM	Tamar FM	Community	
7THE	Hobart	096.1	FM	Hobart FM	Community	
7TTT	Hobart	100.9	FM	Hit 100.9	Commercial	
7WAY	Launceston	105.3	FM	Way FM	Community	
7XS	Queenstown	092.1	FM	7XS	Commercial	
7XXX	Hobart	107.3	FM	Triple M	Commercial	
7ZR	Hobart	0936	AM	ABC Radio Hobart	National	

== Defunct Callsigns ==
Callsign	Area served	Frequency	Band	Fate	Freq currently	Purpose
7CAE	Hobart	092.1	FM	Changed call to 7THE ca. 1980	7THE	Community
7DY	Derby		AM	Moved to Scottsdale and changed call to 7SD in 1954	7SD	Commercial
7EX	Launceston	1008	AM	Moved to FM in 2008 as 7EXX	RadioTAB	Commercial
7HO	Hobart	0864	AM	Moved to FM in 1990 as 7HHO	7RPH	Commercial
7HRT	Northern Midlands	095.7	FM	Shut down in 2012	silent	Community
7HT	Hobart	1080	AM	Moved to FM in 1998 as 7XXX	7TAB (HPON)	Commercial
7LA	Launceston	1098	AM	Moved to FM in 2008 as 7LAA	silent	Commercial
7NT	Launceston	0711	AM	Moved to FM in 2006, retained call	silent	National
7QN	Queenstown	0630	AM	Moved to FM in 1991, retained call	7RN	National
7QT	Queenstown	0837	AM	Changed call to 7XS in 1988	7XS	Commercial
7UV	Ulverstone		AM	Moved to Devonport and changed call to 7AD in 1940	7AD	Commercial
7ZL	Hobart	0603	AM	Changed call to 7RN in 1991	7RN	National
7AD	Devonport	0900	AM	Moved to FM in 2019 retained call	7AD	Commercial
