= William Stammers Button =

First mayor of Launceston (1795–1876)

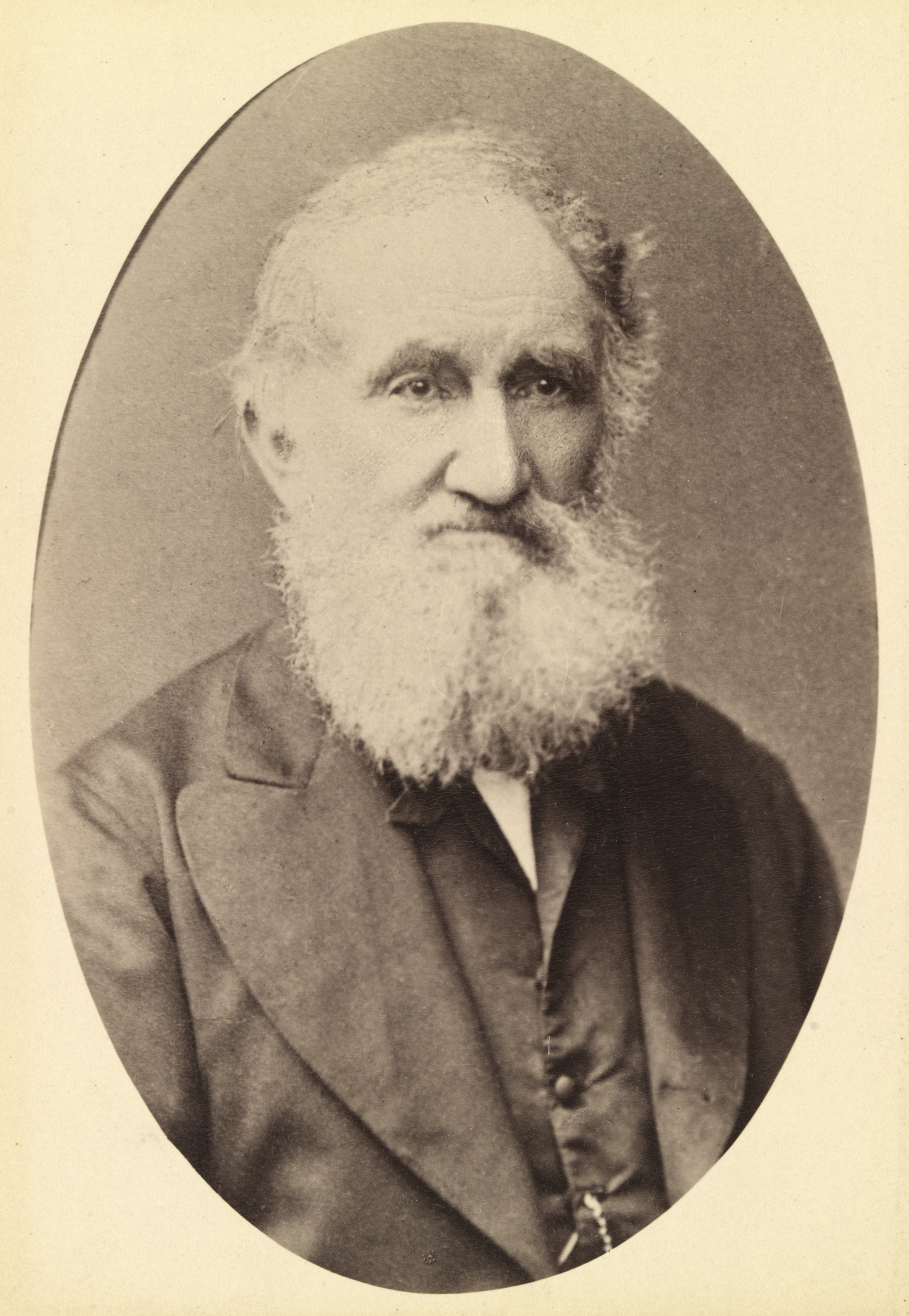
- Portrait photograph by J. W. Beattie, n.d. (State Library of Tasmania)

Mayor of Launceston
- In office 1853–1856
- Preceded by: Office established
- Succeeded by: Henry Dowling

Personal details
- Born: 1795 Nayland, Suffolk, England
- Died: 17 September 1876 (aged 80–81) Launceston, Tasmania

William Stammers Button (1795–1876) was an English free settler in the Colony of Van Diemen's Land (later Tasmania). He served as the first mayor of Launceston from 1853 to 1856, and was associated with the beginnings of the Princes Square Independent Church.

== England ==
Button's life and achievements were recorded in an obituary printed in the Launceston Examiner two days after his death, which source is cited throughout this article. William Stammers Button was born at Nayland, Suffolk, in 1795, where his early boyhood was spent, removing to Sudbury, in the same county, while yet young, in which place he was associated in business with his uncle, in whose service he frequently travelled to various parts of England, visiting also France and Flanders. He afterwards used to recount to some of his friends the incidents of his voyages and long journeys by coach, contrasting them with more modern methods of conveyance.

From memory he would sometimes recall the state of England in his youthful days during the Peninsular War, and describe the depredations of those days. On his marriage he removed to Long Melford, Suffolk. While there, he took an active part in politics, working on the liberal side, and especially seeking with others the repeal of the Test and Corporation Acts, which was accomplished in the year 1828.

== Tasmania ==
In 1833 he came to the Colony of Van Diemen's Land in the ship Forth, bound to Circular Head and Launceston. He was accompanied by his brother Thomas Button, J. S. Waddell, and other members of his family. He first took up his residence at Norfolk Plains, removing to Launceston for business purposes. He was from the beginning one of the chief members of the Anti-Transportation League, giving of his time and money. He was among the earliest promoters of the Cornwall Insurance Company in 1842, one of its first Directors, for many years Chairman of the company. When Launceston was declared a municipality he was elected a member of the first Council and its first Mayor at the first meeting on 1 January 1853. He filled the office by successive elections for four years, and during his mayoralty the chief portion of the work was done in supplying the town with water: a work that took up much of his time.

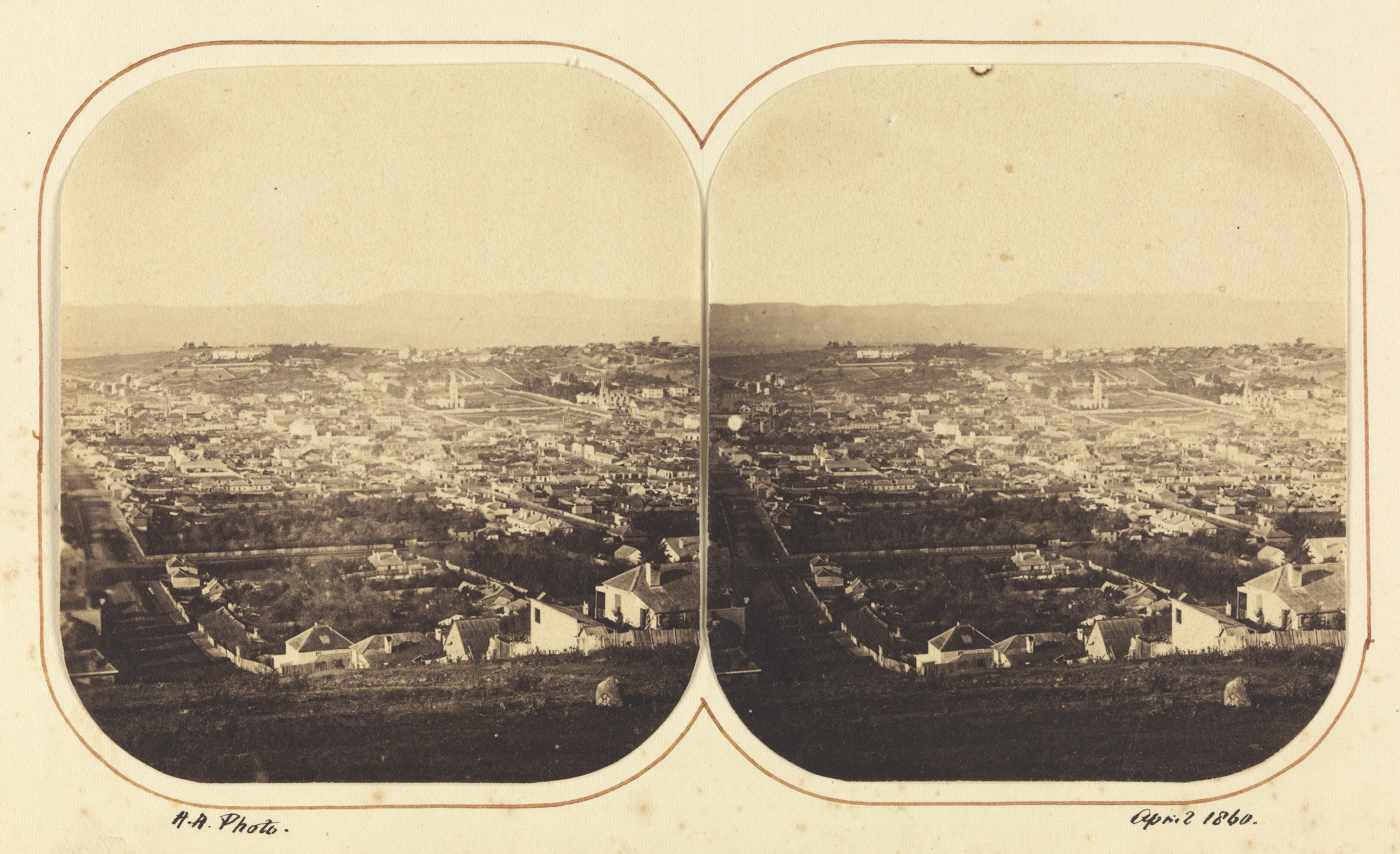
Launceston from Cataract Hill, 1860

Button was appointed a justice of the peace in 1855. In October, 1856, he was elected a member of the Legislative Council for Tamar, and served in that capacity for six years. In the Council he was looked upon as a valuable member. With the Launceston and Western Railway Button was connected from the very beginning, giving labour and money to aid in improving the local means of transit. For a while he was chairman of the Railway Company, till increasing years compelled him to retire. He was one of the early shareholders of the Gas Company and a Director from its formation until his death. He was also involved in establishing the Launceston Examiner, though he never took an active part in the management; and was also one of the founders of the Launceston Mechanics' Institute, of which he was subsequently President.

Button was also noted for his religious zeal. He was a friend and fellow-worker of the Rev. John West, and aided in the building and support of the Prince's Square Independent Church. From the formation of the congregation until old age he had served the church as Treasurer, for a short time was Superintendent of the Sunday school, and at his death was senior deacon. He also for many years acted as Treasurer of the Northern Branch of the Congregational Home Mission, and had taken an interest in the working of the mission on the North West Coast. He was attached to the Bible Society as a working member of its local committee, and was subsequently President for years, until failing health compelled him to resign. According to his obituary in the Examiner, Button was said to have had an acquaintance and sympathy with certain liberal forms of modern thought on religious matters.

=== Death ===
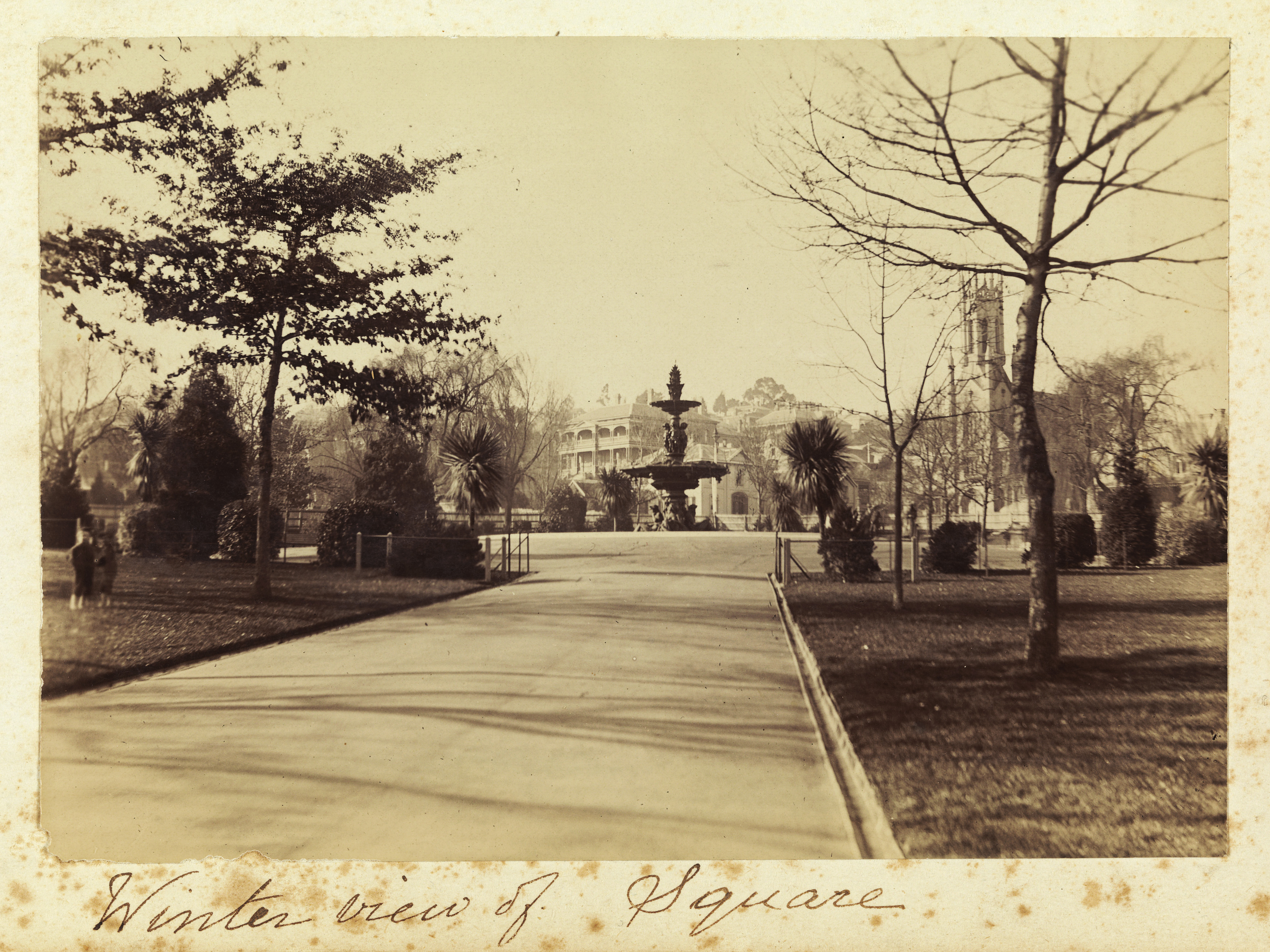
Winter view of Princes Square, n.d.

William Stammers Button died at his residence, St John Street, Launceston, at 8.25 am on Sunday 17 September 1876, aged 80 years, having lived in Tasmania 43 years, and celebrated his golden wedding anniversary only a few months earlier. Most of the places of business in Launceston were partially closed the day following as a mark of respect, and the Municipal Council adjourned immediately after meeting for the same reason. The funeral took place on the afternoon of Tuesday 19 September at Prince's Square Congregational Church.

According to the obituary printed in the Examiner on the day of the funeral, during his 40 years residence in Launceston Button had been one of the city's "most prominent and useful citizens". In the Princes Square Independent Church, afterwards renamed Christ Church, and now a memorial window now honours his name.

== See also ==
- Charles Stammers Button
- Charles Edward Button
