= Christ Church and Milton Hall, Launceston =

19th-century buildings in Tasmania

Coordinates: 41.4413°S 147.1408°E

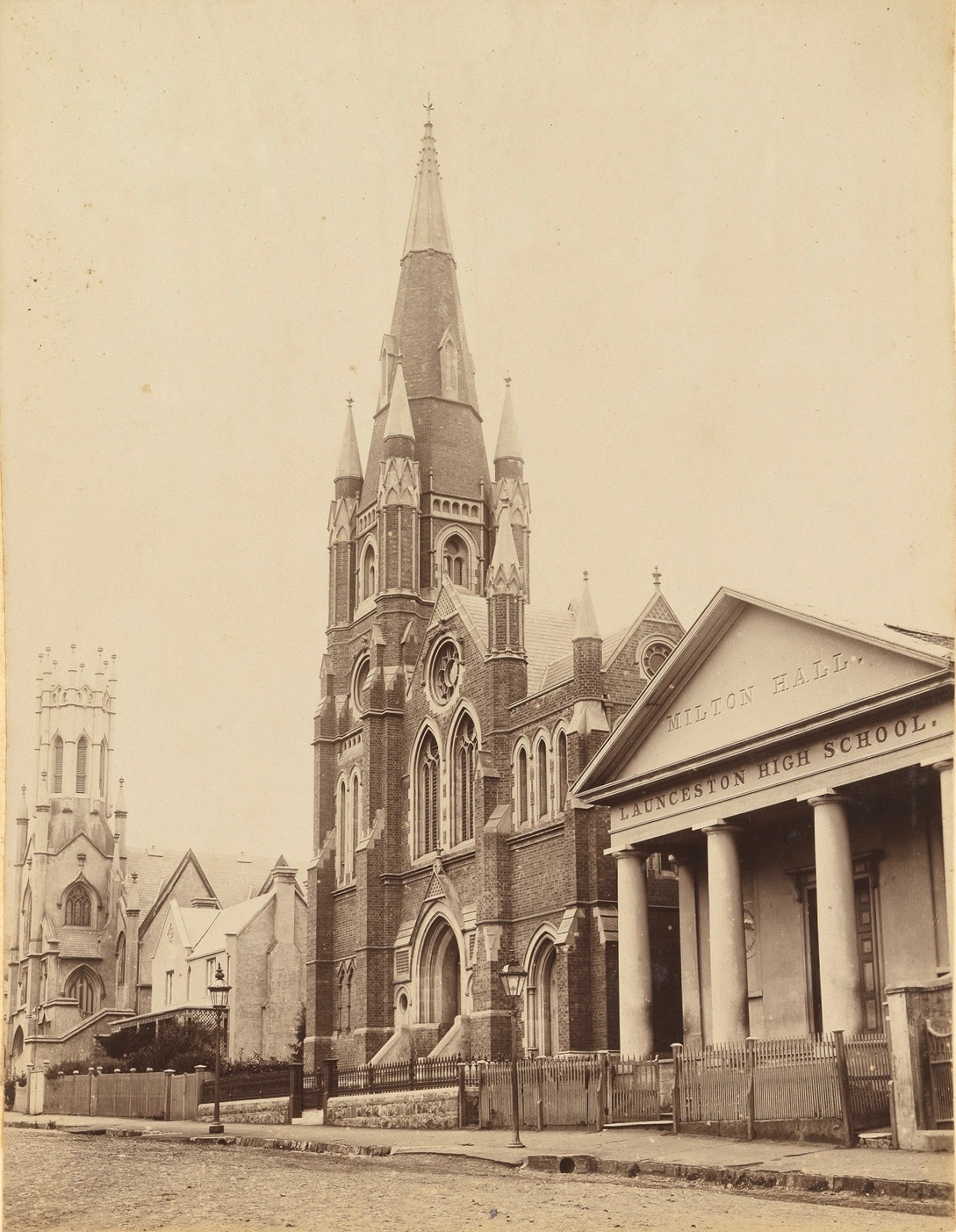
Christ Church and Milton Hall in the late 19th century

Christ Church and Milton Hall are adjacent 19th-century buildings with significance in the early religious and secular history of Launceston, Tasmania. Both buildings are located on Frederick Street, near Prince's Square.

== Milton Hall ==
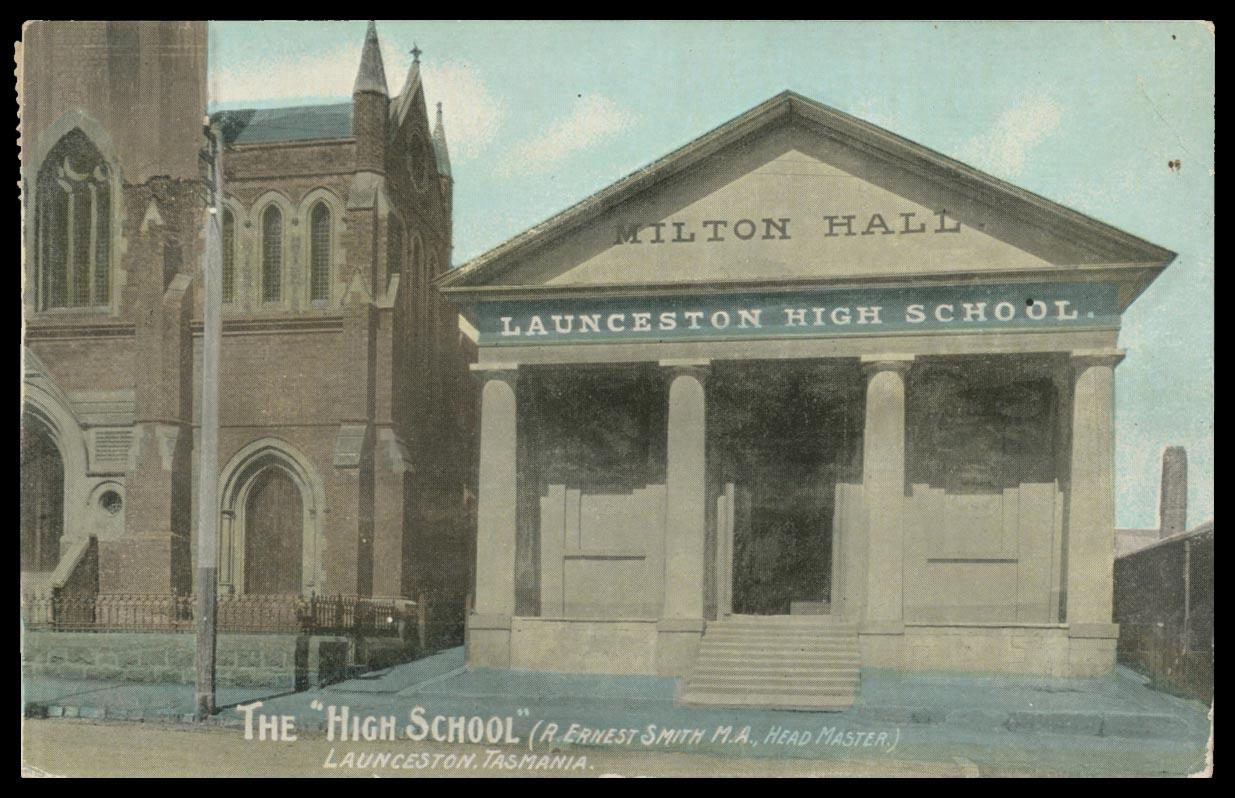
1911 postcard with Milton Hall as Launceston High School

Milton Hall was put up in either 1841 or 1842 as St John's Congregational Church, under John West. The chapel was built in the Greek Revival style with a portico of four Doric columns topped with a pediment.

After the establishment of Christ Church, Milton Hall served as a Sunday school and, from 1884 till 1913, as Launceston High School.

Milton Hall hosted historic debates on the cessation of convict transportation and the framing of Federation. The first version of the Australian flag was said to have been conceived and sewn there.

== Christ Church ==
Christ Church was renovated into a large red brick church between 1883 and 1885, to a Gothic Revival design by Granger & D'Ebro which included an octagonal spire, turrets and buttresses. The church was furnished with a c. 1875 organ by Bevington & Sons. A stained glass window representing the Calling of Matthew was made by Brooks & Robinson, Melbourne, for Christ Church, and was displayed in the Albert Hall as part of the Tasmanian Exhibition of 1891–92.

From 1983 till 2021, Christ Church functioned as a Baptist church, officially gazetted as City Baptist Church.

== Today ==
In 2021, Christ Church and Milton Hall—both owned by the Baptist Union of Tasmania—were put up for sale, and in 2022 Tasmanian entrepreneur Rob Sherrard acquired both buildings.

== See also ==
- William Stammers Button

== Sources ==
- Clark, C. M. H. (1978). A History of Australia. Vol. 3. Melbourne University Press. p. 422.
- Cooper-Douglas, Erin (19 July 2021). "Launceston's Christ Church and Milton Hall, dating back to 19th century, for sale". ABC News.
- Daunt, Adam (21 July 2021). "Launceston's Christ Church, Milton Hall to be sold off as Baptists seek new pastures". The Examiner.
- Peach, Joshua (14 June 2022). "Virgin Australia co-founder Rob Sherrard to buy Milton Hall and Christ Church". The Examiner.
- Peach, Joshua (20 June 2022). "Rob Sherrard to take ownership of Milton Hall". The Examiner.
- Official Record of the Tasmanian International Exhibition, Held at Launceston, 1891-92. Tasmania: Printed for the Commissioners at the "Launceston Examiner" Office. 1893. pp. 42, 72.
- The Heritage of Tasmania: The Illustrated Register of the National Estate. The Macmillan Company of Australia. 1983. p. 124.
- "Milton Hall in Frederick Street was built in 1841 …". Launceston Library. Facebook. 14 May 2021.
- "Annual Meeting for Granting Licenses". Launceston Courier. 6 September 1841. p. 3.
- "The Late Mr W. S. Button". The Examiner. 19 September 1876. p. 2.
- "The Late Rev. John West". The Examiner. 13 December 1873. p. 2.

== Links ==
- Media related to Christ Church and Milton Hall, Launceston at Wikimedia Commons
