= Launceston Gasworks =

Industrial site in Tasmania, Australia

Coordinates: 41.4315°S 147.1412°E

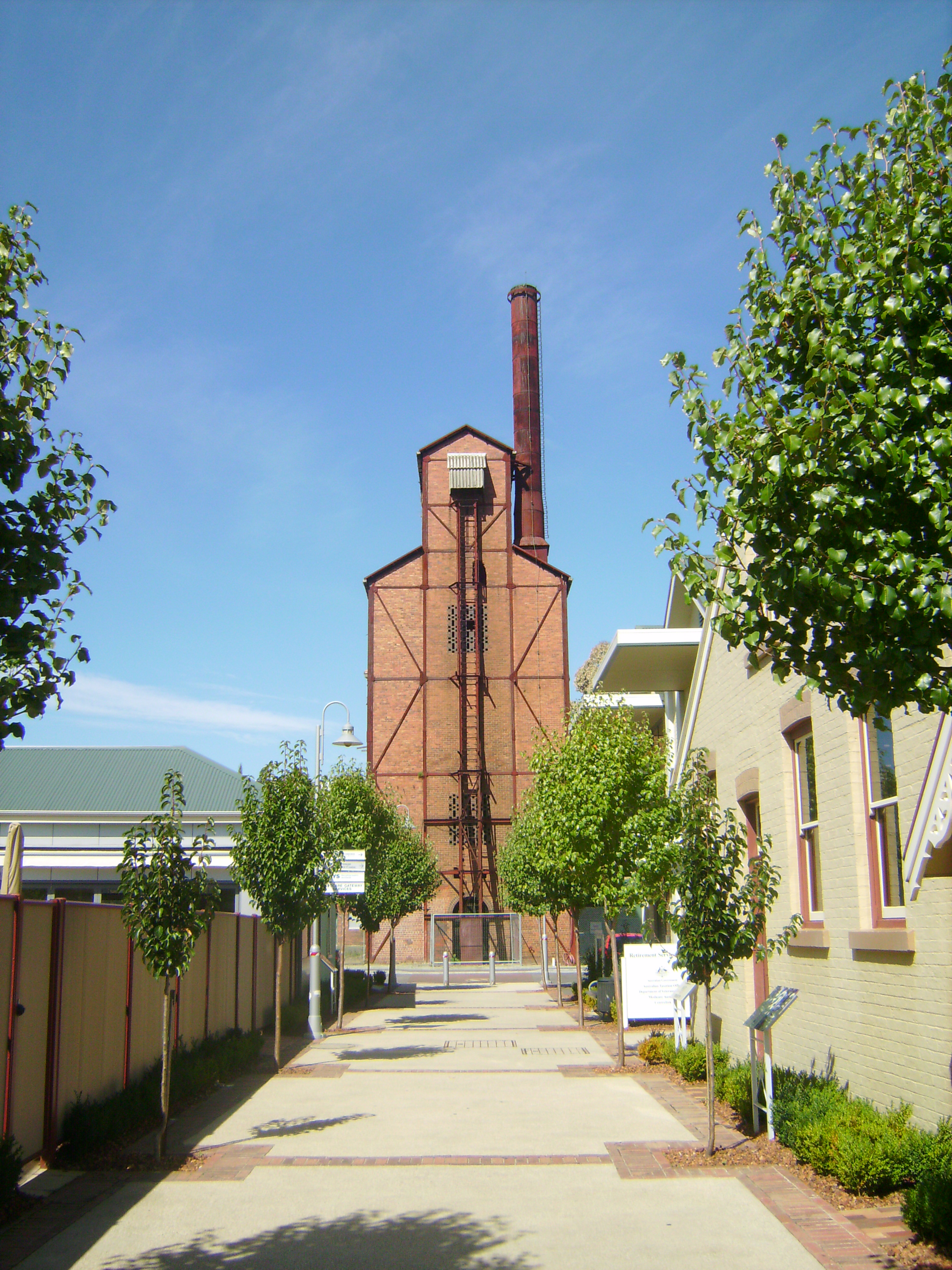
The vertical retort from the newly restored Boland Street half of the complex

The Launceston Gasworks is a former industrial site located in the CBD of Launceston, Tasmania. The site was the principal supplier of gas to the City of Launceston before the importation of LPG in the 1970s. The gasworks produced gas by heating coal and siphoning off the gas that it released before refining and storing it on site in a set of 3, steel frame gasometers. The first buildings on site were the horizontal retort buildings built in 1860 from sandstone and local brick. The site was later used by Origin Energy as their Launceston LPG outlet. The site is instantly recognizable by its 1930s, steel braced, vertical retort building with the words "COOK WITH GAS" in the brickwork.

== History ==
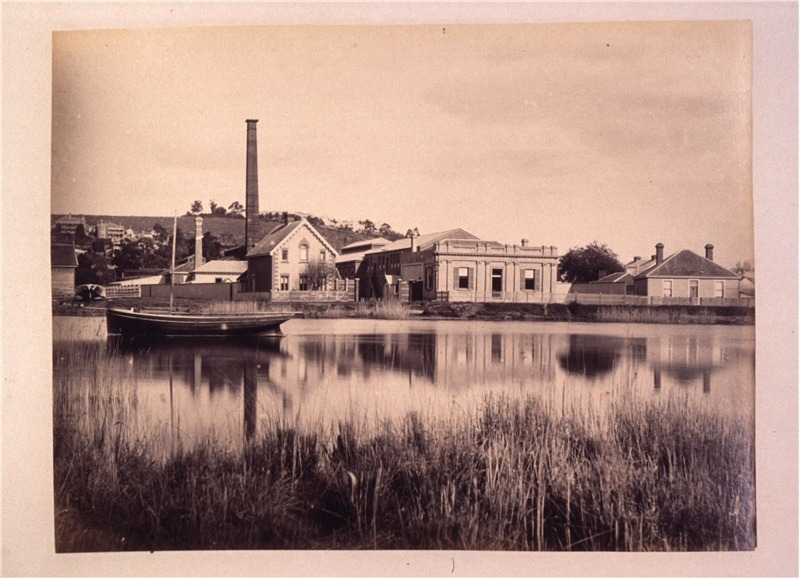
The gasworks from across the North Esk before the construction of the levee system

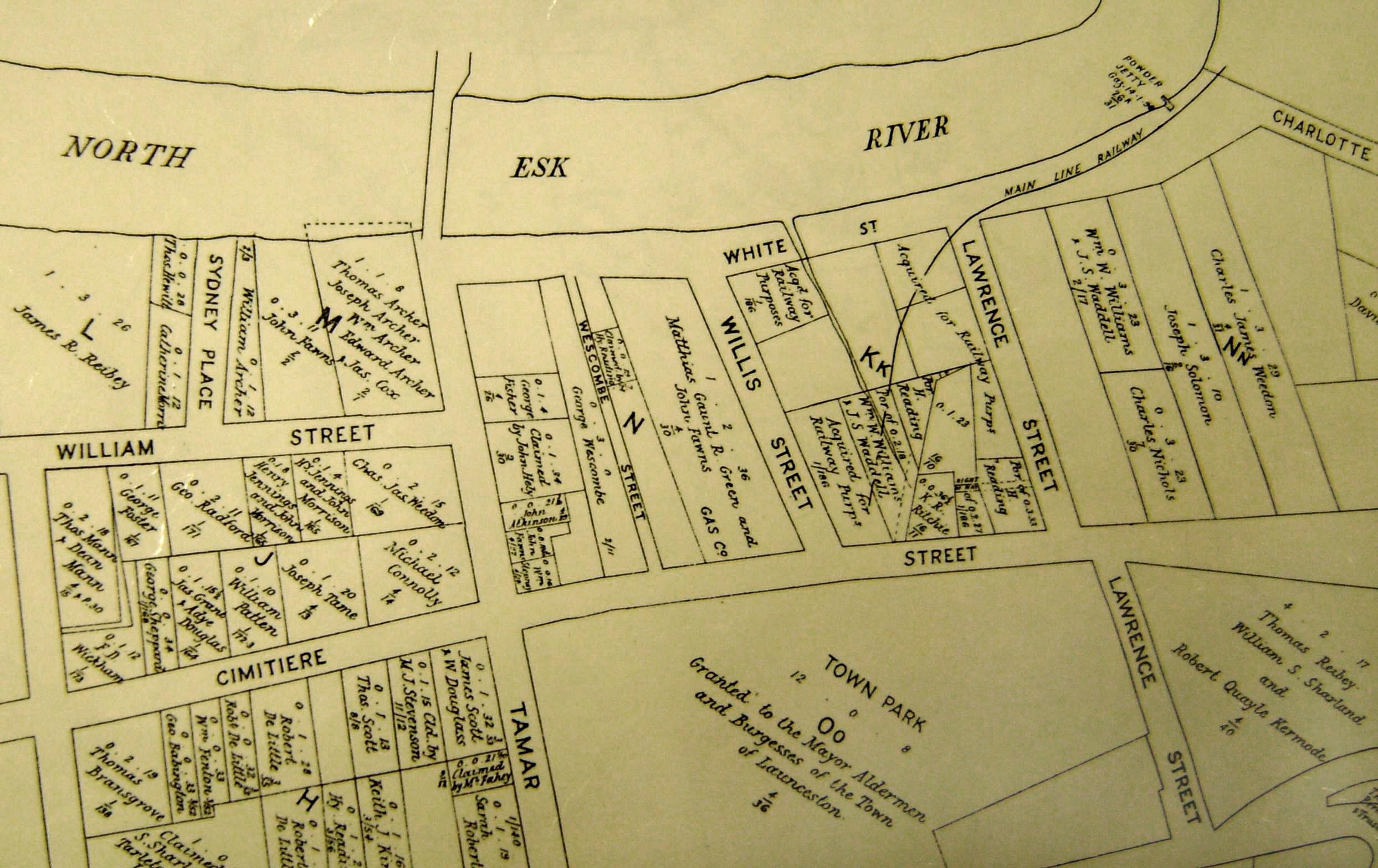
1914 map of the gasworks site and TMLR railyards. Note: the lane labelled Wescombe Street. This street and land on either side was later incorporated into the gasworks site

Starting in 1826, Launceston was lit with lamps running on sperm whale oil. These lamps were unpopular and local butchers soon replaced these with "slush" lamps that burned animal fat. These lamps were still disliked by many so in 1844 a local man, Doctor William Russ Pugh (a statue of him is located in Launceston's Prince's Square), produced his own coal gas for his house and a year later Benjamin Hyrons lit the Angel Inn with methane gas. As early as 1854, the Examiner newspaper urged locals to consider the creation of a gasworks in Launceston pointing out the numerous benefits and cheaper costs of coal gas as a means of lighting. In 1856 the Launceston City Council engaged Scottish-born engineer, William Falconer of the Hobart Gas Company, to prepare plans for the proposed gasworks.

At a public meeting at the Cornwall Hotel on the 18 May 1858, the Launceston Gas Company was formed. The company purchased a marshy paddock near Cimitier Street the same year due to its proximity to the North Esk River in order to build the new gasworks. Machinery from England and suitable builders were assembled in 1859 with the Horizontal Retort Buildings completed in early 1860. On the 5 April 1860, Launceston turned on its new gas street lighting for the first time and oil lamps were replaced by gas.

The main source of gas was Newcastle Coal from New South Wales. The gas was extracted by heating the coal until gas was produced. The site of the gasworks was also directly opposite the TMLR rail yards on Willis Street which was also convenient for the delivery of coal. The demand for coal gas continued to grow even after the Duck Reach Power Station was commissioned in 1896. In 1932, the Vertical Retort House was added to the site to increase productivity. The site was expanded to the west in the mid 1900s which involved the removal of Wescombe Street and the historic cottages that lined it in order to make a 3rd gasometer and later an LPG cylinder yard when the site was taken over by Boral and eventually Origin Energy. In 2007 the site was sold and the 3 gasometers were largely dismantled. The cylinder yard has now been built over by the new Centrelink building and car park with additional developments planned to take place in the future.

== Notable buildings ==
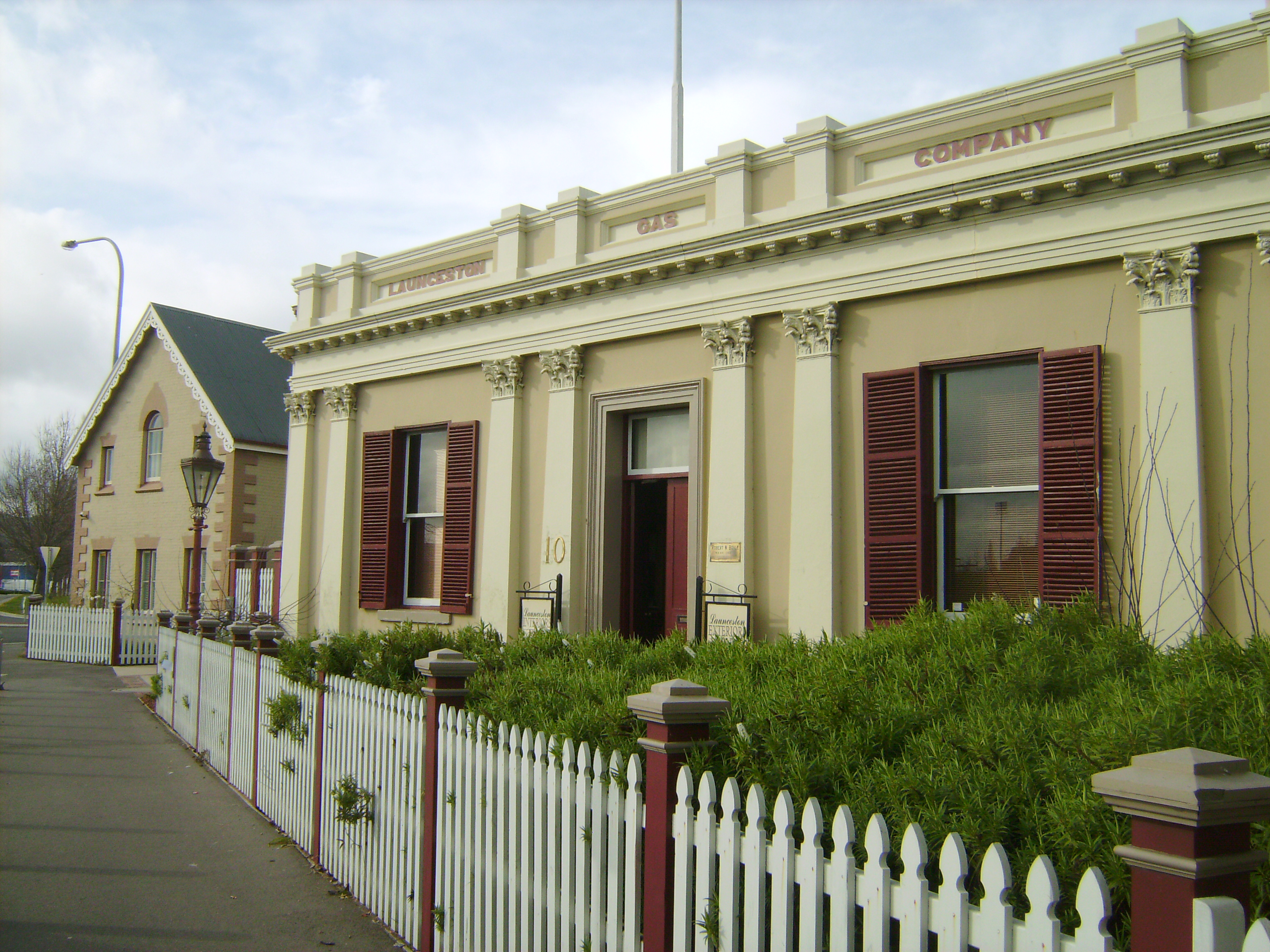
The company office and chief engineer's cottage from Boland Street after restoration

=== Chief engineer's cottage ===
The chief engineer of the site used to live in an ornate cottage on the NE corner of the site. The first engineer was William Falconer from Scotland and many more followed. An unusual feature associated with the cottage was the chief engineer's private, heated swimming pool. It is said to still be there, buried under the courtyard between the cottage and the gas laboratories. The pool was heated by the Vertical Retort Building's boilers and was strictly out of bounds to all workers unless they were needed to fix it. The cottage is now restored and serves as a private residence.

=== Company office ===
The company office is located next to the chief engineer's cottage, and once looked out across the North Esk until the levee system was built over the wharves. The original building was a brick cottage but in the 1880s it had its facade rebuilt in a Victorian style. The headquarters have now been restored along with the other buildings on the site's north facing Boland Street.

Out in front of the company office is one of the original gas lamps used in the city. The company operated 123 gas lamps across the city as well as a special one outside the office. The lamps were removed when the city turned to electric lighting but during restoration work, an original lamp was located and returned to the site where it now stands.

=== Horizontal retort ===
Built from local brick with sandstone quoining and arches, the Horizontal Retort building was erected in 1860 and is one of the oldest buildings on site. The central portion of the building used to have a 39.3 m (129 ft) brick chimney and housed 18 retorts with room for an additional 6. On either side of the main building were two wings: the western one for the storage of coal imported form NSW and the other being a purifying house which also contained the "smiths" and gasfitters shops. A second coal store, located where the Carbureted Water Gas Building now stands, closely followed the same design. Gas produced in this building was stored in the 15 m (50 ft) diameter No.1 and No.2 Gasometers. The brick chimney was built by A Henderson with Francis and Miller being contracted to build the main building, all at a total cost of £3333. In 1929, this building was flooded to a depth of 4 ft during the great floods of 1929, after which damage was repaired quickly.

When the Vertical Retort was built in the 1930s, the Horizontal Retorts were removed along with chimney and replaced with a boiler and a large tar plant in the mid portion of the building with associated 3 oil tanks outside on the southern face. The brick and masonry portion of the eastern wing was re-fitted with 3 exhausters and the steel and galvanized iron portion upgraded to contain 4 more purifiers adding to a total of 8.

Today the building is falling into disrepair despite minor restoration work being carried out a few years earlier and most of the sandstone is heavily eroded. The north face of the building is only partially original. The last restoration attempts from the 1980s saw the purifiers removed and converted to conference rooms; closing the originally open air structure with galvanized iron and plate glass bearing the new Gasworks emblem, based on the ventilation hole patterns in the Vertical Retort's walls.

=== Gasometers ===
Located along the southern perimeter of the site facing Cimitier Street, the gasometers were where gas produced at the gasworks was stored at pressure for later distribution. At present, three of the original five gasometers are on site in various levels of salvage. The newest No.5 Gasometer built in the mid 1940s is mostly untouched except for the gas bell has been removed and the pit filled. This gasometer is mounted on a concrete base with a 12 sided steel frame mounted on top that has been painted red. A few meters to the east are the brick and sandstone foundations of two smaller gasometers; the middle dating from the late 1800s and the furthest to the east being one of the original 2 built in 1860. These 2 gas holders were smaller than the newer one and were last painted Boral's yellow and green colour scheme before they were dismantled in 2007. Shortly after dismantling, a proposal was forwarded to council to develop all 3 gasometers as a single 6 storey apartment block but was cancelled. The other one of the first 2 gasometers on site was dismantled in the early 1900s with the foundations and water pit being converted into a covered tar and liquor well located in the easternmost corner of the site (now vacant). In the 1946 plan for the site, a final 250 000 cubic ft. gasometer was proposed to be built to the northwest of the No.5 Gasometer but was canceled along with the rest of the proposal.

==== No. 1 Gas Holder ====
 Capacity: 35 000 cubic ft. (991 cubic meters)
 Lift Segments: 1
 Construction Date: 1860
 Current Condition: Converted to tar and liquor pit in the early 1900s. Completely demolished later

==== No. 2 Gas Holder ====
 Capacity: 35 000 cubic ft. (later 70 000 cubic ft. (1982 cubic meters))
 Lift Segments: 1 (later 2)
 Construction Date: 1860 (rebuilt 1943)
 Current Condition: Frame and bell removed. Base intact but buried under parking lot (exposed prior to 2014)

==== No. 3 Gas Holder ====
 Capacity: 70 000 cubic ft. (1982 cubic meters)
 Lift Segments: 2
 Construction Date: 1860s-80s (exact date unverified)
 Current Condition: Frame and bell removed. Base intact but buried under parking lot (exposed prior to 2014)

==== No. 4 Gas Holder ====
 Capacity: 140 000 cubic ft. (3964 cubic meters)
 Lift Segments: 2
 Construction Date: 1910s (exact date unverified)
 Current Condition: Completely demolished

==== No. 5 Gas Holder ====
 Capacity: 250 000 cubic ft. (7079 cubic meters)
 Lift Segments: 3
 Construction Date: 1944
 Current Condition: Frame and base intact. Bell removed

==== No. 6 Gas Holder ====
 Capacity: 250 000 cubic ft. (7079 cubic meters)
 Lift Segments: 3
 Construction Date: Never (proposed 1946)
 Current Condition: Never Built

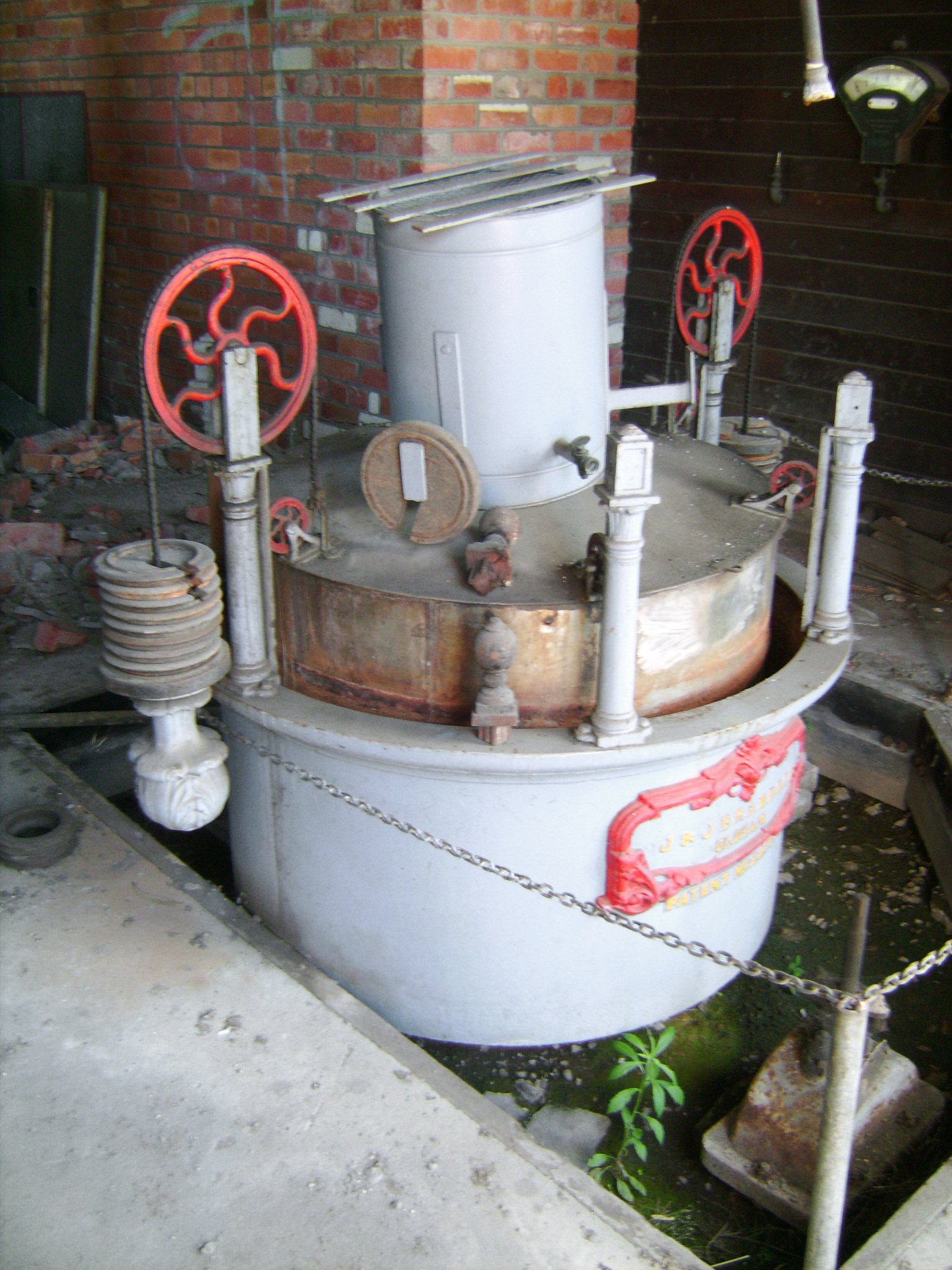
One of 2 J&J Braddock Gasometers in the Governor Cottage

=== Governor cottage ===
Located on the south of the site bordering Cimitier Street, this small galvanized iron and timber building was used as the gaswork's distribution point. As with the rest of the southern half of the site, this building is in disrepair with all of its windows broken by vandals. Inside, most of the original machinery is still intact such as 2 miniature Braddock Gasometers which are largely intact and are ornately decorated. The miniature gasometer on the eastern side of the building is connected onto the inlet mains for the main Gasometers on site (from the point it leaves the purifiers in the Horizontal Retort Building), with the second being directly connected to the outlet mains between the Gasometers and the main governor. The main governor is located at the back of the building along with an exhauster and various meters and pressure gauges. The original governor was first installed in 1860 when the gasworks were first built and changed little since then though the building itself has been rebuilt. The governor originally distributed gas into 10 gas mains (2 large and 8 smaller) with the largest 2 just visible on the external surface of the building.

As part of a development proposal from 2007, this building was meant to be restored as a public historic site with interpretive panels but was canceled in 2008.

=== Carburetted Water Gas Building ===
The Carburetted Water Gas Building is located next to the Vertical Retort House and was last used as the offices for Origin Energy after the Carbureted Water Gas Plant was removed from within. Though built later in the gasworks history (post 1940s), closely imitates the same style as the Vertical Retort through the use of steel and brick. The building is 3 storeys high with a small 4th level on the roof.

When built in 1956, the building was primarily built around a single Carbureted Water Gas Plant with plans for a later second. The plant itself dominated the first 3 levels of the building with its massive steel furnace and generator blocks (steel structures lined with firebrick on the interior). The first floor (ground level) housed many associated machinery items including both electric and steam powered exhausters, a wash box and tram cart. The upper most level was used as a coal store with gravity feeders connecting it to the plant.

As part of the current development, the Carbureted Water Gas Building is being restored and connected onto the Vertical Retort House via a glass atrium mimicking the profile of the buildings' rooflines.

=== Meter Shop ===
The Meter Shop was where the new gas meters were assembled and tested. By 1958, there were 6333 meters across Launceston. The Gas Fitters did the meter rounds by bicycle, often loading the bicycles with everything they needed from 20 ft pipes to plywood. The Engineering staff and the company fitters also used the building to write up the daily logbooks. The Meter Shop also played a secondary role as the staff training center and under Origin Energy ownership in the late 1900s, was solely used for this purpose. Gas Fitters, Meter Makers and Repairers had to do an apprenticeship that lasted 5 years with most men working for the company their whole life. Even the management stayed with a total of four Company Secretaries in 120 years. At its peak, the company employed up to 80 people. The company encouraged a family feeling among its employees, often organising annual Christmas picnics.

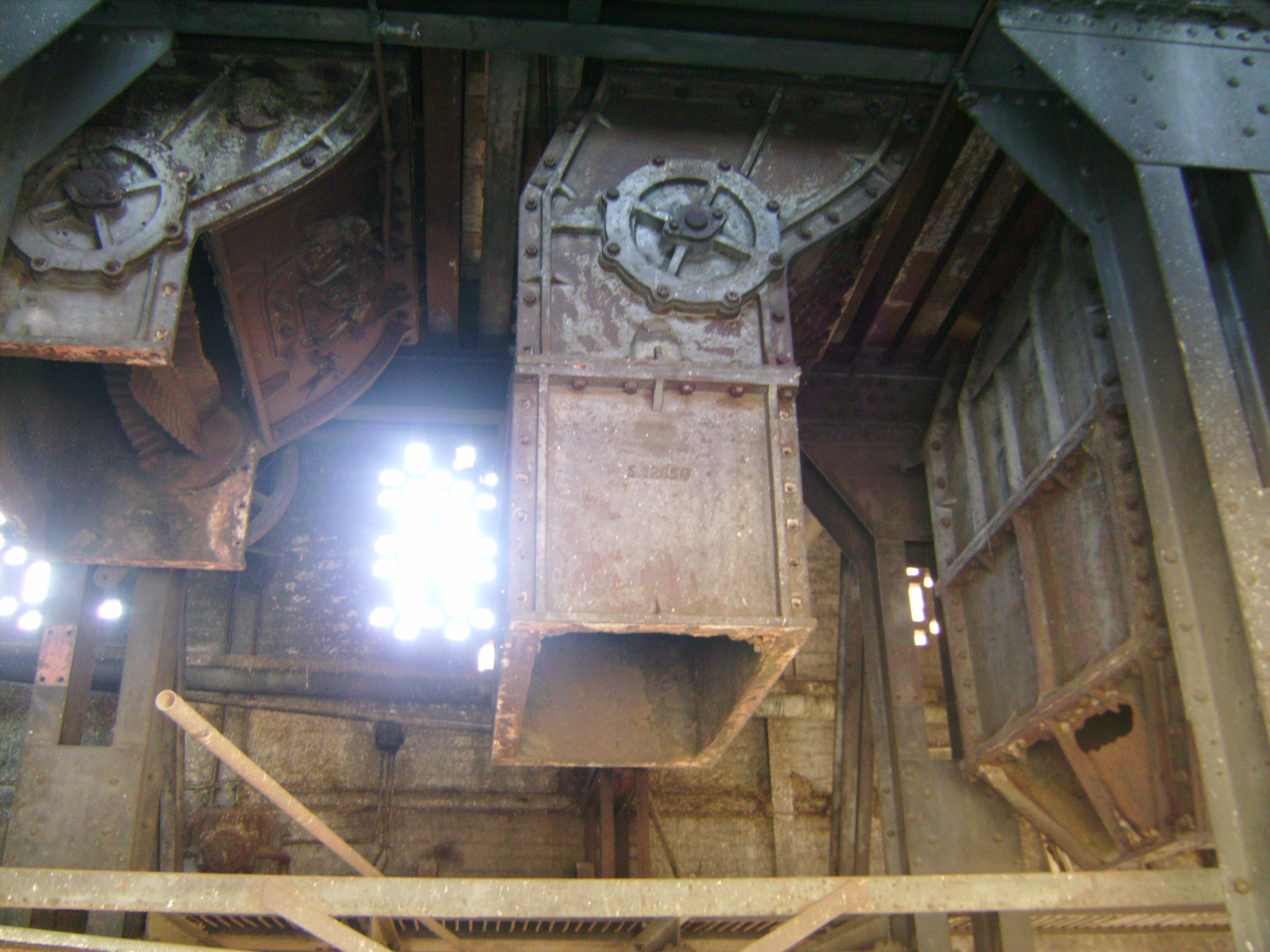
Three of the 8 coke extractors in the Vertical Retort Building's main hall in various levels of salvage before being scrapped in late 2012

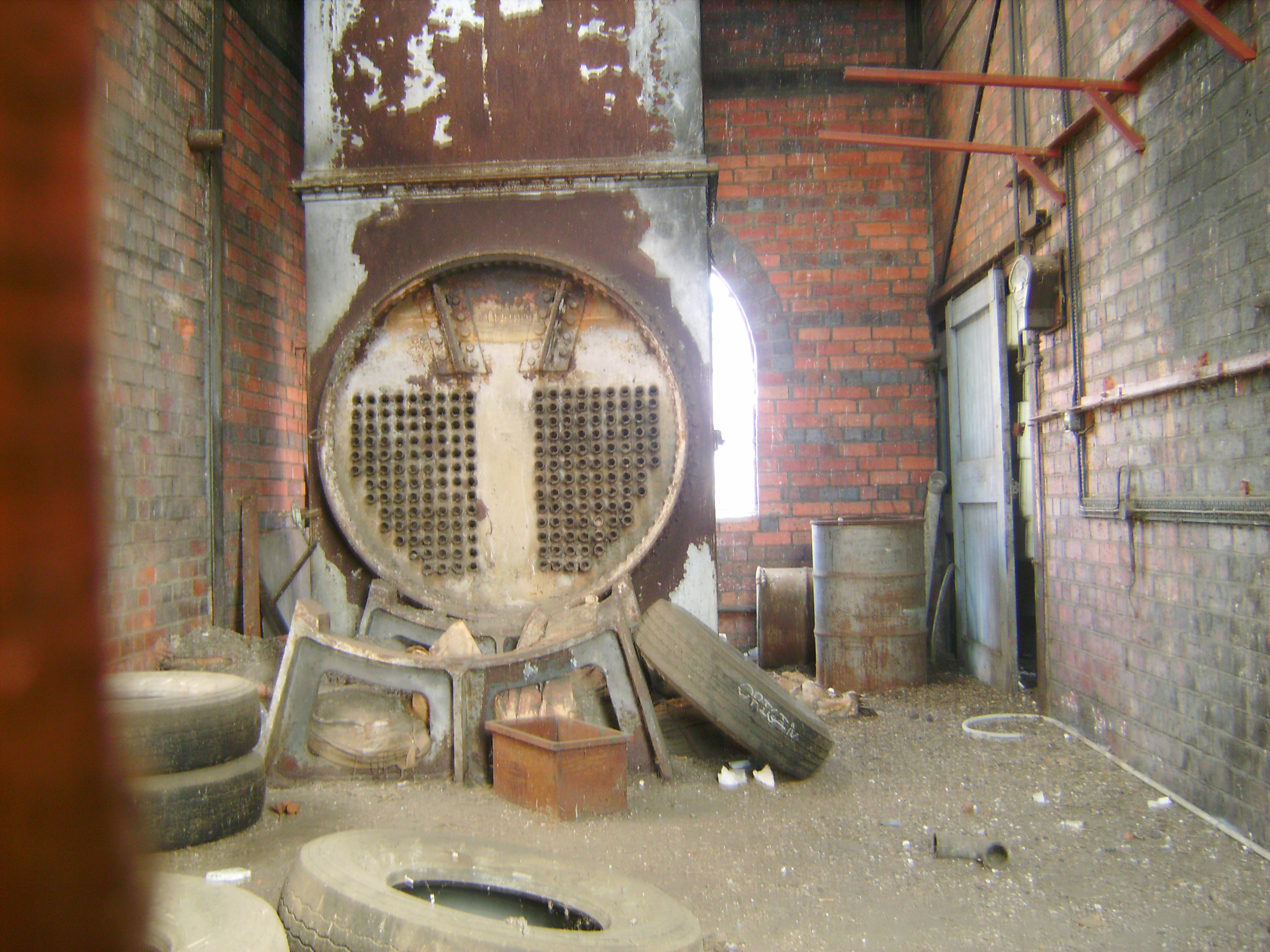
Additional waste heat boiler (partially dismantled) in the rear room of the Vertical Retort Building. Note the insulated co2 flue connecting the boiler to the retort blocks.

=== Vertical Retort Building ===
The 29m high (not including stack height) Vertical Retort Building was built in 1932 as the primary gas production facility for the Launceston Gasworks site. The building was officially opened on 19 March 1932 and was described by the company director as a masterpiece of modern chemistry and engineering. During the opening ceremony, the buildings moving components were switched on and visitors were taken to the top of the retorts to view what was the most advanced gasworks of its time. During later operation, the building was described as a harsh place to work in due to blazing heat, noise and gas fumes.

The vertical retort is the most recognisable building on site and is an iconic building in Launceston. The building is built with a steel frame forming a grid pattern, supporting individual "panes" of brick walls. The inscription "COOK WITH GAS" is written in the top floor's brickwork. The building climbs five stories with the coal conveyor still intact running up the front of the building, though the breaker pit at its base has been filled in. The original building was shorter in length and contained only 4 retorts but foundations for later extensions were included and soon used as the building was extended. The small rear section plus the first connected division of the building were part of this extension with the divide visible by a slight change in brick colour.

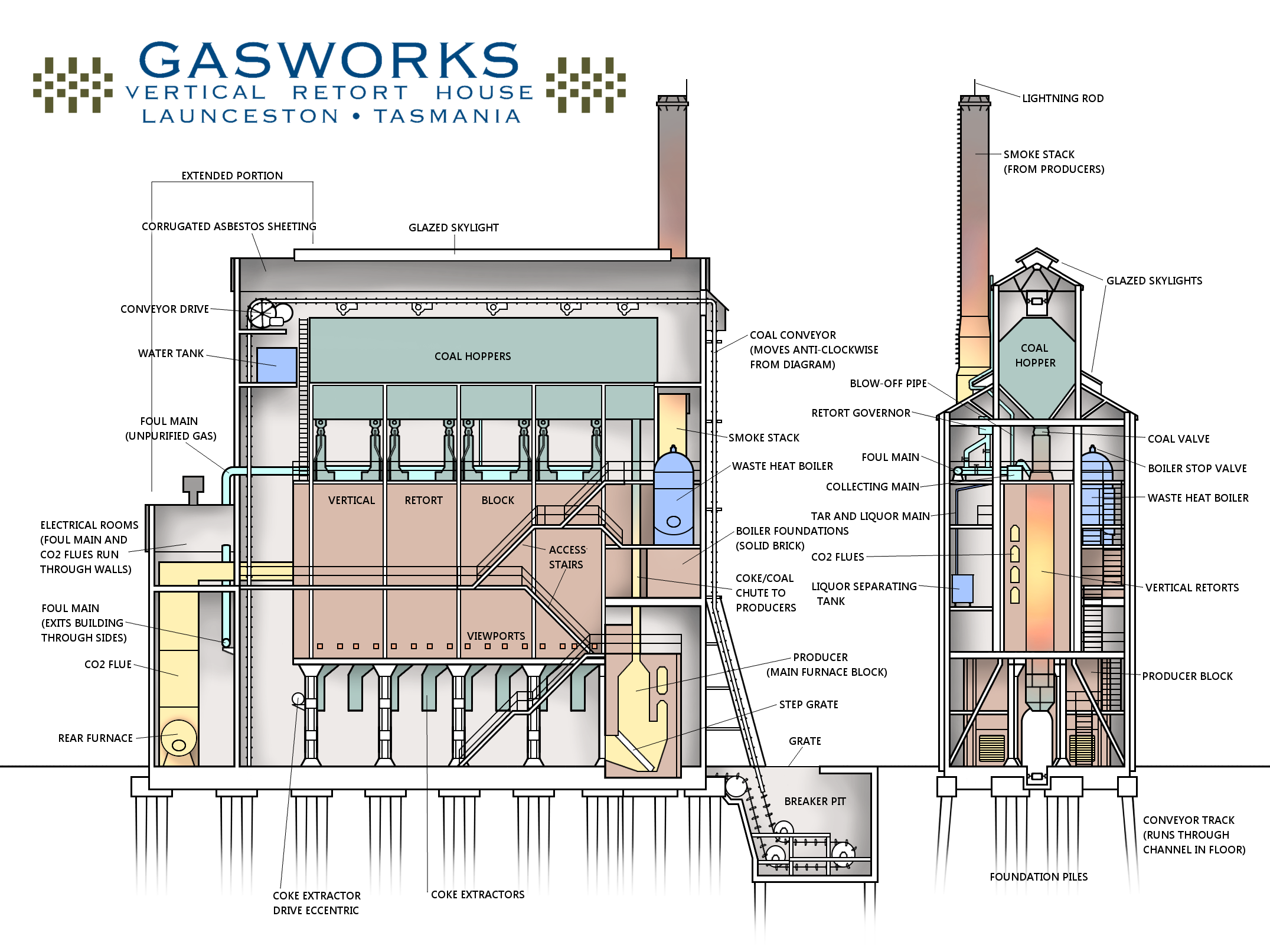
Labeled cutaway diagram of the Vertical Retort House's internal components

Inside, the coal was transported to the top level where it was deposited in a long hopper at the top level of the building (which also contains the conveyor drive and water tank). From the hopper, the coal was fed via a single chute into the vertical retort block which was then divided into 8 separate retorts, where it was heated by furnaces (and later an additional steel furnace in the back room) located on the first floor (ground level). The extracted gas was collected in two parallel "Collector Mains" running along the top of the retort block. Accumulated tar and liquor was drained from the collector mains into a small liquor separating tank on the 3rd floor on the western side of the building. The collected gas was forced through the retort governor (recently removed for scrap) and into the foul main that runs down the back of the retort house where it was purified elsewhere on the site. Like the Horizontal Retorts, the Vertical Retort was run on Newcastle Coal imported from New South Wales. In the 1950s, modifications were made to the gasworks to allow the site to use Fingal Coal from the Fingal Valley in north east Tasmania.

Unlike many gasworks sites in Australia that were either demolished or stripped after closure, the vertical retort house in Launceston still retained most of its original machinery after it was abandoned. Both the electric coke extractor eccentric and conveyor drive remained intact within the building along with most of the fourth floor machinery. The waste heat boiler on sublevel 3 had been reduced in size due to salvage operations in the 1980s as with the waste heat boiler on the first floor (ground level) which was also partially dismantled. The original brick furnaces (producer blocks) at the front of the building were mostly dismantled with the exception of a now free-standing, brick archway which used to allow the conveyor to pass through the furnace block. Original lighting and electronic equipment still remained within the building both on the first floor and the electrical room on the 3rd floor at the back of the building. The coke extractors on the underside of the retort blocks were in various levels of salvage with the most complete being located at the rear of the building.

Since it was abandoned in favor of LPG in 1977, the vertical retort was left to fall into ruin with large piles of droppings cover the floor and machinery due to the pigeons that used the building as a roost because of the many openings in its brickwork. In late July 2012, most of the building underwent cleaning to remove the accumulated waste from the interior before scrapping and internal demolition stripped the building of its heritage value to make way for a building proposal.

=== Laboratory and Workshop ===
Located between the Chief Engineers Cottage and the Vertical Retort, the Laboratory was an essential part of the site. Every day, samples of gas were tested in this building for quality. The laboratory was no safe place, before switching to Butane for town gas in 1978, the coal gas process produced many hazardous by-product gasses such as Ammonia and Hydrogen Sulfide which were always a potential hazard. This building was also fitted with a drafting table where the Lab Assistant drew up site plans when they were needed. All the distribution maps for Launceston's gas mains were produced here.

During restoration in 2007, the iron-clad, timber frame building was lifted from its foundations to make way for a new laneway into the site. The building was relocated a few meters to the north where it was placed on new foundations and a new, modern section of similar proportions was added to it. The Laboratory and Workshop has since been restored and in one of its windows is displayed various items used on the gasworks site that were uncovered during restoration.

== Redevelopment ==
Since the site was sold by Origin Energy in 2007, the Launceston Gasworks have become a potential site for development being located in the CBD close to Launceston's City Park and the Inveresk precinct.

=== 2007 gasworks development ===
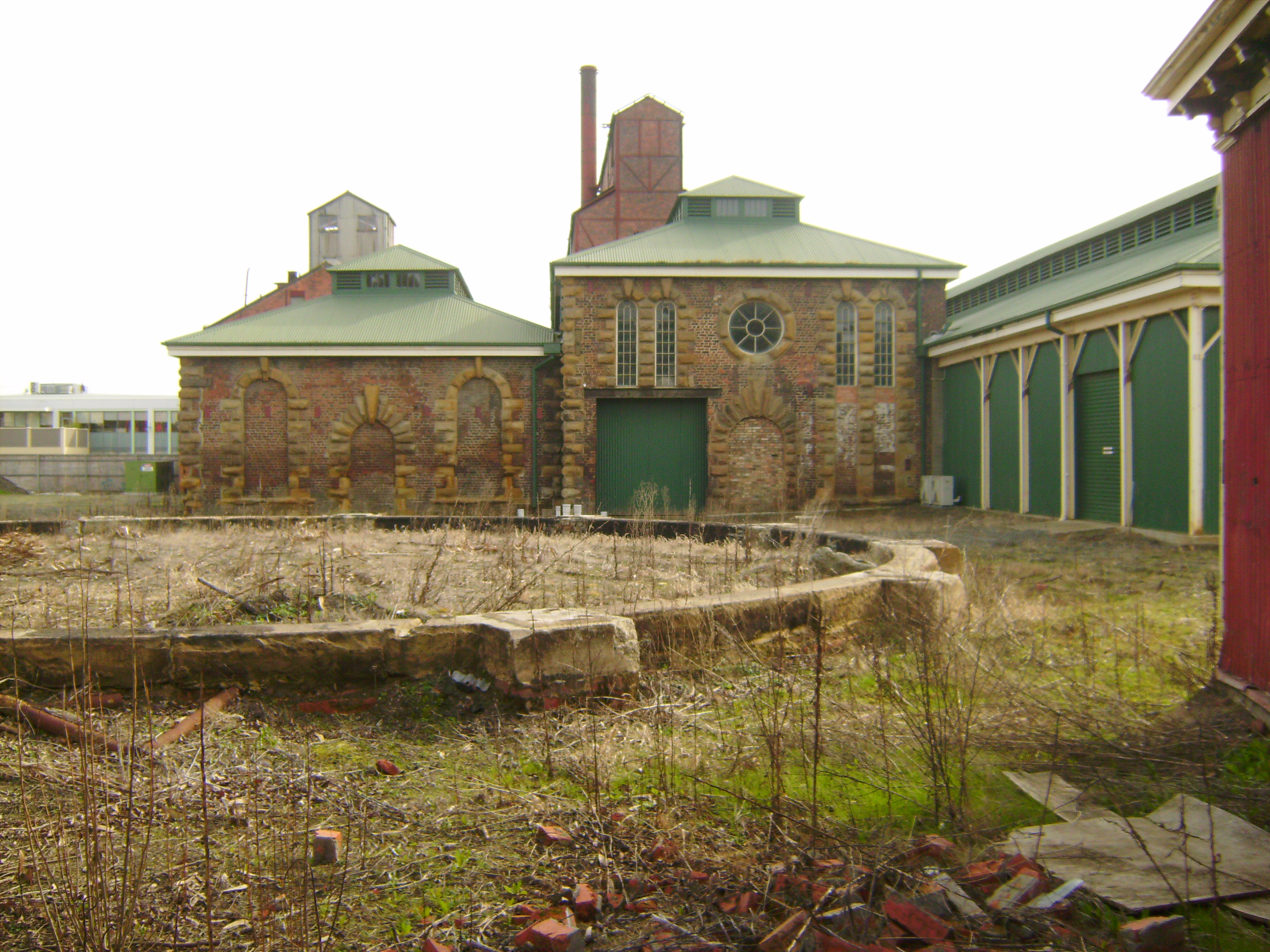
The oldest buildings on the site: The horizontal retort buildings are visible with the foundations of one of the older gasometers in the foreground

The gasworks have currently been partially developed as part of a large 3 part scheme costing $35 million. The first stage costing $8 million involving the restoration of the cottages on the north of the site as part of the new Centrelink complex has already been completed though the second and third stages were cancelled in 2008 due to the Great Recession. The second stage was to involve the construction of a whole new set of buildings consisting of offices, retail outlets, restaurants, and apartments. These buildings were to be built on the south of the site facing Cimitier Street within the foundations of the gasometers as well as a free standing structure next to the Governor Cottage and a glass office building connecting the Vertical Retort House to the Carburetted Water Gas Building. As part of the second stage, the Governor Cottage and Horizontal Retort were meant to be restored to allow access to the general public. The third stage was disapproved by the Launceston Council but was to involve the development of the abandoned Origin Energy parking lot across Willis Street into more shops but has been converted into a public parking lot instead.

=== 2012 restaurant proposal ===
In June 2012 a proposal by developer Ross Harrison was put forward to the Launceston City Council to incorporate the Vertical Retort House and Carburetted Water Gas Building into a restaurant and bar with additional commercial space. In late July 2012, the site changed zoning from industrial to commercial and work commenced on cleaning the building of the accumulated pigeon droppings and polystyrene blocks that were dumped inside it. In mid-September removal of the Corrugated Asbestos Roofing started. On the 10 October 2012, the original 1932 machinery was blow-torched out of the building to be taken away followed by disassembly of the fire-brick retorts except for the coke extractors which were partially retained for aesthetic value. The completed works now link the two buildings with a glass atrium as the earlier proposal had intended. A bar and reception area are currently located on the 1st floor (ground level) of the Vertical Retort House under the former retort blocks with restaurant space occupying the area between the two buildings and into the Carburetted Water Gas Building. The upper levels of both buildings have been remodeled to support retail and office spaces. The machinery within the Vertical Retort House underwent a heritage survey to assess the historic value of the surviving equipment and from that, local architectural firm, ARTAS, was left to incorporate this into the final design. Removed machinery was intended to be kept as museum exhibits but has yet to be utilized for such purposes. At present all the machinery in the Vertical Retort has been removed except for a few components on the ground level and the waste heat boiler on the floors above, with salvaged components stored in the Horizontal Retort House.

== See also ==
- Launceston, Tasmania
- Coal gasification
- Gasification
- Origin Energy
- Tasmanian Main Line Company

== Notes ==
Most information sourced from the newly restored Gasworks Historic Site, Launceston.
