= John West (writer) =

Australian settler and clergyman (1809–1873)

The Reverend John West
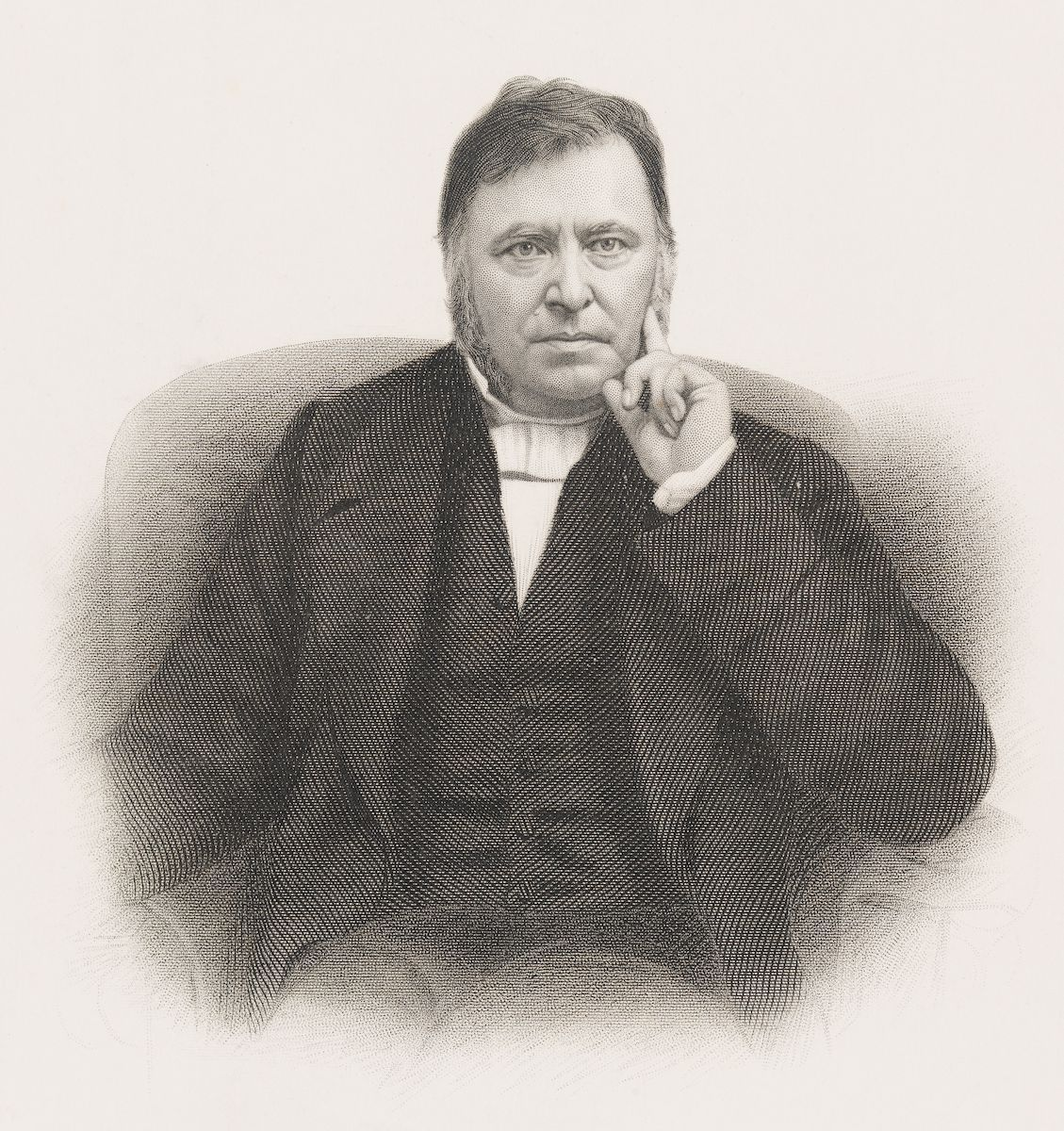
- Engraving of West by John Cochran, n.d.

Personal life
- Born: 17 January 1809 England
- Died: 11 December 1873 (aged 64)

Religious life
- Religion: Christianity (Congregationalist)

John West (17 January 1809 – 11 December 1873) emigrated from England to Van Diemen's Land in 1838 as a colonial missionary, and became pastor of an Independent (Congregational) Chapel in Launceston's St. John's Square. He also co-founded The Examiner newspaper in 1842 and was later editor of The Sydney Morning Herald.

== Life ==
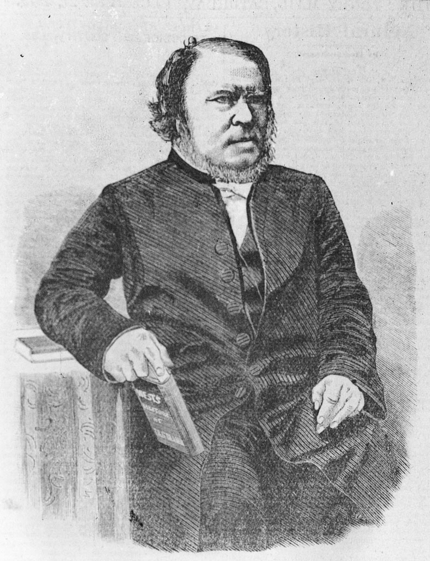
Likeness of John West, from an engraving (State Library of NSW)

West was born in England, the son of The Reverend William West and his wife Ann, née Ball. West emigrated to Van Diemen's Land (later renamed Tasmania) in 1839 where he officiated as an Independent minister at Launceston for sixteen years. West attracted half of the members of the Congregational ministry of Charles Price. West's contribution to Launceston and Australian life was great and varied promoting private and charitable enterprise. With James Aikenhead and J. S. Waddell, West founded The Examiner newspaper in 1842. He co-founded the London Agency Association to promote colonial interests, an Immigration Society, the Launceston Mechanics' Institute (1842), City Mission, Public Hospital, General Cemetery, and Cornwall Insurance Company in Launceston and the Hobart Town High School.

John West was a leader in the movement seeking the abolition of transportation of convicts to the Australian colonies. Affronted by the social, economic and moral effects of convictism, he promoted colonial opposition to transportation from his pulpit and editorials in the Examiner and Hobart's Colonial Times, though historian Babette Smith has exposed West's demagogic rhetoric against convict society. He founded the Launceston Association for the Cessation of Transportation which developed into the first intercolonial political organisation, the Australasian Anti-Transportation League, in Melbourne in 1851. For this occasion he collaborated on the design of the League banner, the precursor to the Australian National Flag. The success of united action against Transportation, which was abolished in 1853, led West to expand his interest in representational government through his essays on Federation, Union of the Colonies, (under the pseudonym John Adams) published locally and in The Sydney Morning Herald during 1854.

In 1854 the proprietor of The Sydney Morning Herald, John Fairfax, invited John West to become its first official editor, and West moved to Sydney from where he guided debate on matters of colonial, national and international importance until his sudden death in Woollahra, Sydney, in 1873. His two-volume History of Tasmania, published in 1852, analysed the development of the colony, the penal system and the condition of the Aboriginal people. He is honoured by the Examiner-John West Memorial Lecture in Launceston and the John West Medal at the University of Sydney.

== See also ==
- Australasian Anti-Transportation League
- Christ Church and Milton Hall, Launceston
- William Stammers Button
