= Pulse Tasmania =

Digital media company

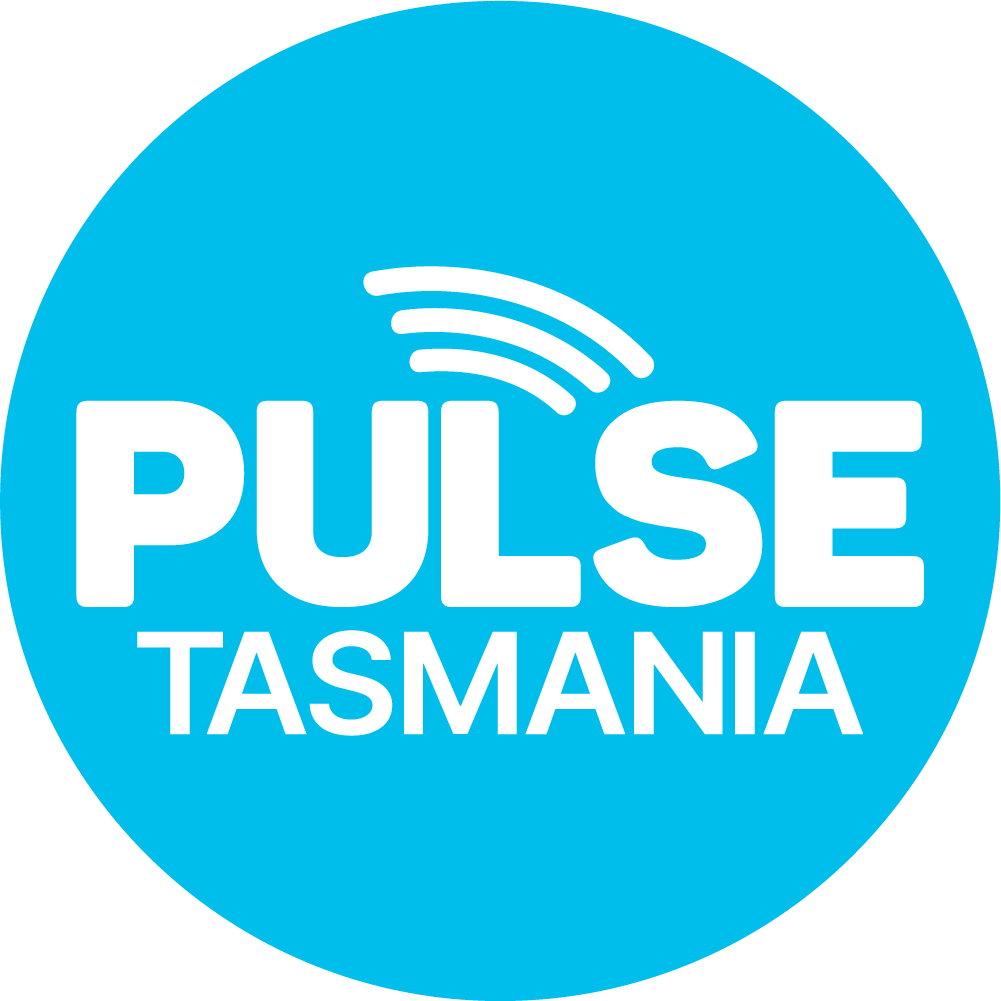
- Company type: Private company
- Website type: News and entertainment
- Available in: English
- Founded: 1 April 2016; 10 years ago
- Headquarters: Hobart, Tasmania, Australia
- Owner: Pulse Media Group Pty Ltd.
- Website: www.pulsetasmania.com.au
- Advertising: Native, Display
- Current status: Active

Pulse Tasmania is a digital news publisher owned by Pulse Media Group Pty Ltd based in Hobart, Australia.

Pulse publishes freely accessible local Tasmanian news content on digital platforms, including its website and social media pages (like X and Instagram).

Pulse's office and newsroom is located at 99 Liverpool Street, Hobart.

According to Mediaweek, Pulse reaches more than 150,000 Tasmanians each week.

== History ==
Pulse started as a radio station (Pulse FM) in 2016, serving sub-regional areas of Hobart.

In September 2020, Pulse announced it would be pivoting to position itself primarily as a content publisher rather than a radio station, with the radio station moving in-line with the digital content platforms.

In October 2021, Pulse FM Hobart officially rebranded to Pulse Hobart – positioning itself primarily as a digital publisher. The radio station remained under the Pulse FM branding.

In the 12 months of 2021, Pulse Hobart accumulated more than 2.4 million social media interactions.

On 1 January 2024, Pulse FM Hobart (the radio station) was separated from Pulse's news brand, becoming slam! Hobart. The change was soft-launched. On 27 January 2024, Pulse Hobart adopted a statewide brand, changing its name to Pulse Tasmania and becoming a purely news-focused brand.

== Controversies ==
=== Community moderation issues ===
In January 2024, a member of Tasmania's Aboriginal community complained about the large number of negative comments which contained racism, homophobia and threats of violence which were made on Pulse Tasmania's Facebook page, after a post was made about Invasion Day. Pulse initially responded to the complaint by saying it did not have the resources to continually monitor comments across all posts and that after the publication of a story, moderation was considered on an "as-reported" basis. However, Pulse ultimately disabled comments on the story and apologised for any hurt caused due to the comments.

In May 2024, the Multicultural Council of Tasmania submitted a formal complaint to Equal Opportunity Tasmania alleging that Pulse Tasmania had failed to adequately moderate comments on its posts to social media. MCOT alleged Pulse Tasmania was facilitating the incitement of hatred towards people of migrant backgrounds after a large number of negative comments were made on a post by Pulse about former premier Peter Gutwein's fundraising proposal for the Migrant Resource Centre. However, Pulse said it had not received any requests to remove specific comments related to the story.

=== Alleged Liberal Party connections ===
On November 25th 2025, Pulse received statewide attention following numerous viral articles on social media by independent journalist Heath Clark concerning alleged Liberal Party connections. According to The Mercury, Josh Agnew issued a concerns notice to Clark the following day, claiming the reporting was defamatory & damaged the outlet's reputation. In a statement to the media, Heath claimed the outlet was trying "to suppress his work which was in the public interest". In January 2026, the notice expired and no legal action followed.

In the article series, it would reveal Agnew Holdings (Tas) co-owned by Josh Agnew's parents, was listed as offered approximately $1m by the Tasmanian Development Board in FY2024/25. The reporting alleges of direct personal ties between various ministers Jane Howlett, Madeleine Ogilvie & Liberal candidate Richard Hallett to the Agnew family. In late November, Heath (in collaboration with the Tasmanian Times) would reveal that following the 2025 state election, the Rockliff government had broke caretaker conventions and paid over $50,000 to Pulse to advertise the budget on its platforms. These findings were then circulated in the media and was referred to the state's Auditor General for the opposition Labor Party.

On Friday December 5th, Pulse owner Josh Agnew was caught celebrating with Jeremy Rockliff, Independent David O'Byrne and pro-stadium supporters. Critics on social media raised questions regarding perceived editorial bias towards the stadium & conflicts of interest.

On January 23, 2026 Pulse officially partnered with the Poll Position, A podcast operated by EMRS and owned by Brad Stansfield, a former liberal advisor for the Hodgman government and party member. The partnership has never been disclosed in any news reporting about the program by Pulse.

In early February 2026 it was revealed from ministerial diary disclosures that Tasman Public Affairs, chaired by former liberal advisor Brad Nowland was lobbying on behalf of Pulse Media Group. The contents of the meeting are unknown but has been speculated to be about crisis management or to receive greater GMO integration. The meeting occurred one day after initial reporting by Heath Clark, and the same day the concerns notice was handed down.

On April 16 after failing to secure the numbers required, the government dropped its greyhound phase-out bill in the Legislative Council less than 24 hours into the debate. The decision was notified to Pulse Tasmania with a story published at 10:34am without the government informing the non-government MLCs, leaving them in the dark. Other outlets reported on the story only after the Council's updated notice paper became public and MLCs raised the issue on the floor.

On May 27 an email distributed by Ruth Forrest to Department of Premier & Cabinet regarding health concerns was leaked to Pulse. Within hours a reporter from Pulse called the councilor for comment unaware that content had been leaked. The following week Ms Forrest would go on to accuse the Premier's office of distributing the email, a claim which has been rejected.

In October 2026, Following the Trevallyn Primary School Christmas controversy, Pulse attracted scrutiny following a report from The Examiner that its owner had a conversation with Premier Jeremy Rockliff at the King Island Hotel, during which a journalist reportedly overhead the phrase "save Christmas", followed by the owner saying Pulse would publish the story and that Rockliff "should provide a statement". The following evening at 8:33pm Pulse published the article, Fourteen minutes later at 8:47 pm the Premier made a social media statement. Pulse & the government denied allegations that it had conspired with each other. The Premier later apologized for the impact of his comments.

On October 27th 2026, a parliamentary committee found the Liberal government in breach of caretaker conventions by extending government advertising with Pulse during the 2025 election period. However, Pulse claimed it independently removed the promotions at 6:59pm when Parliament was dissolved. The committee found the breach was committed by the government, not the outlet.
