= Charles Price (minister) =

English-born Congregational minister

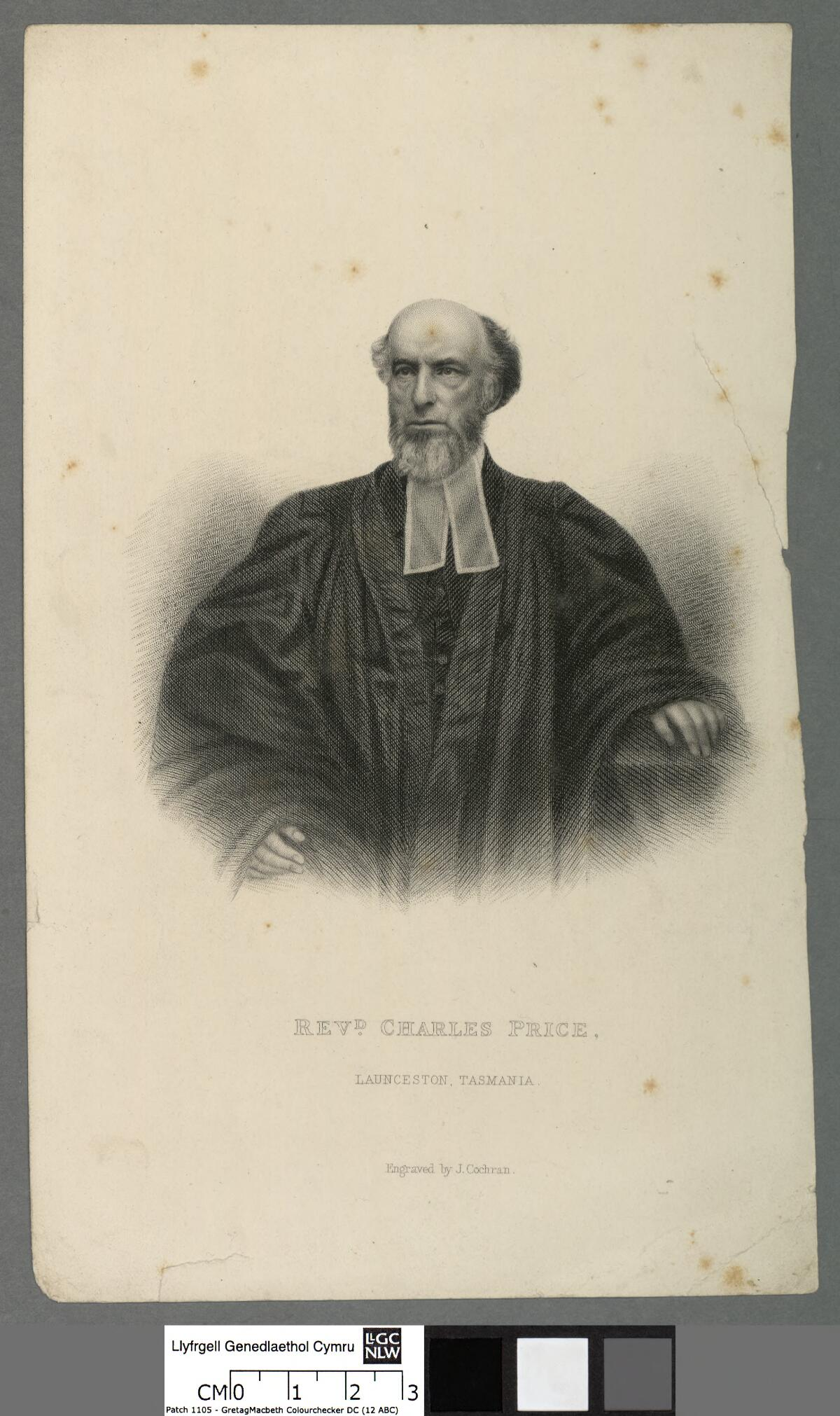
A portrait of Charles Price, from the Welsh Portrait Collection at the National Library of Wales.

Charles Price (21 November 1807 – 4 August 1891) was an English-born Congregational minister in colonial Tasmania.

Price was born in London, England, son of John Price and Ann, née Seckerson. In 1829 he entered Highbury College to study for the ministry of the Congregational Church. He was ordained in 1832, and sailed with his wife for Hobart.

Price preached in Launceston from August 1832 to January 1833, when he was invited to become the first minister of Pitt Street Chapel, Sydney, the first Congregational church in Australia. Price opened this chapel on 13 February 1833. After acting for some time as resident minister at Port Stephens, New South Wales, he returned in 1836 to Launceston. Here he accepted the charge of Tamar Street Congregational Chapel, the pulpit of which he occupied until his death in Launceston in 1891. In 1839, a new church was established by John West, which resulted in half the members of Price's church moving to West's.
