= 90.1 Chilli FM =

Chilli 90.1fm (7EXX)
- Launceston, Tasmania; Australia
- Broadcast area: Launceston RA1
- Frequency: 90.1 MHz

Programming
- Language: English
- Format: Contemporary hit radio

Ownership
- Owner: ARN; (Bass Radio Pty Ltd)
- Sister stations: 89.3 LAFM

History
- First air date: 1938 (as 7EX)
- Former call signs: 7EX (1938–2011)
- Former frequencies: 1010 kHz (1938–1978); 1008 kHz (1978–2011)
- Call sign meaning: Variation of final AM call sign 7EX; station was set up by The Examiner

Technical information
- Licensing authority: ACMA
- ERP: 5,000 watts
- Transmitter coordinates: 41.439743°S 147.137945°E
- Translator: 101.1 FM Launceston CBD (328 watts)

Links
- Website: www.chillifm.com.au

Chilli 90.1fm (call sign 7EXX) is an Australian radio station in Tasmania. Owned and operated by ARN, it broadcasts a contemporary hit radio format to Launceston and surrounding areas. First broadcast in 1938 as 7EX, the station currently broadcasts from studios in York Street, alongside sister station 89.3 LAFM. Chilli90.1fm also has a Scottsdale version called Chilli99.7FM which has repeat frequencies of 99.7 MHz in Scottsdale and the North-East of Tasmania and 94.5 MHz in Weldborough and St Helens.

== History ==
The station was set up in 1938 by The Examiner newspaper and shared a fierce rivalry with rival 7LA, splitting the city's audience through much of the 1980s. Eventually, the station changed hands numerous times, before forming the Tote Sport Radio horse racing radio network.

In 2002, television station ABNT-3 vacated VHF channel 3, opening up space for further FM radio services in Launceston. In 2005, it was announced that 7EX, along with 7LA and ABC Northern Tasmania was to move to the FM band – 7LA on 89.3, 7EX on 90.1 and ABC Northern Tasmania on 91.7. In 2010, Grant Broadcasters purchased the 7EX licence from Tote Sport Radio – who in turn purchased a narrowcast licence on 7EX's old AM frequency – before relaunching in 2011 as contemporary hit radio-formatted Chilli 90.1fm.

Today, the station networks the majority of its programming to Scottsdale-based Chilli 99.7.

In November 2021, Chilli FM, along with other stations owned by Grant Broadcasters, was acquired by the Australian Radio Network. This deal allowed Grant's stations, including Chilli FM, to access ARN's iHeartRadio platform in regional areas. The deal was finalised on 4 January 2022. Chilli FM integrated with ARN's KIIS Network but retained its current name.

== On Air ==
Weekdays:

- Breakfast 6am–9am Nic & Marcus For Breakfast
- Mornings 9am-10am 60 Minutes Non-Stop
- Mornings 10am–1pm Mornings on Chilli
- Workdays 1pm–5pm Afternoons with Jackie
- Drive 5pm–7pm Will & Woody
