= Dorothy Edwards (mayor) =

Australian schoolteacher and civic leader

Dorothy Edwards CBE

Mayor of Launceston
- In office December 1955 – December 1957
- Preceded by: Brian Thornley
- Succeeded by: James McGowen

Personal details
- Born: Dorothy Edna Annie Fleming; 20 June 1907
- Died: 9 March 2006 (aged 98)
- Spouse: Rex Edwards (m. 1933)
- Education: University of Tasmania; London School of Economics
- Profession: Schoolteacher

Dorothy Edna Annie Edwards CBE (née Fleming; 20 June 1907 – 9 March 2006) was an Australian schoolteacher and civic leader. She served as mayor of Launceston, Tasmania, from 1955 to 1957, the first woman to serve as mayor of an Australian city. She was also president of the National Council of Women of Australia from 1960 to 1964 and a long-serving board member of the Australian Broadcasting Commission (ABC) and the State Library of Tasmania.

== Early life ==
Edwards was born on 20 June 1907. She grew up in Deloraine, Tasmania, where her father was the town clerk. She attended Deloraine Primary School and Launceston High School. She went on to study at the University of Tasmania and the London School of Economics, where she graduated Master of Arts.

Edwards worked as a schoolteacher, teaching Latin and literature. Due to a marriage bar she was forced to resign from the education department in 1933. She taught at Launceston High School and Hobart High School.

== Municipal politics ==
Edwards was a leader of the campaign to allow women to stand for election to the Launceston City Council, a right which was not granted until 1945 by an act of state parliament. In 1949, she stood for election to the council. She was elected with the second-highest number of votes, behind only the incumbent mayor Denham Henty, becoming Launceston's first female alderman. She became chairman of the council's finance committee, and in 1954 she became the first woman to preside over a council meeting. She served as an alderman for 15 years in total. In 2026 Glenorchy City Council discovered that Gladys Boniwell was elected as the first female alderman in 1947, displacing Edwards who had been reported in later years to have been the first woman to stand and also later first elected as alderman in Tasmania.

In 1955, Edwards was elected as the first female mayor of an Australian city. She held office for two terms from December 1955 to December 1957. Her achievements in office included "the building of the City Baths at Windmill Hill, flood prevention measures and the opening of a by-products plant for the Killafaddy Abattoirs".

== Other activities ==
Edwards helped revive the National Council of Women of Launceston, serving as secretary (1947–1956) and president (1958–1960). She was subsequently elected as the first Tasmanian president of the National Council of Women of Australia (NCW), holding office from 1960 to 1964. She sought to expand the NCW's membership in Australia and established closer relationships with similar organisations in the Asia-Pacific. She also lobbied for equal pay and the removal of marriage bars, intending for the NCW to play a more activist role. Edwards additionally served as a vice-treasurer (1963–1970) and vice-president (1970–1979) of the International Council of Women (ICW). She was appointed to the ICW's Committee of Honour in 1979 and attended her last ICW meeting in 1996.

Edwards served on the board of the State Library of Tasmania from 1953 to 1978. In 1962 she was appointed to the board of the Australian Broadcasting Commission (ABC) by the Menzies government, in place of fellow Tasmanian Enid Lyons. She remained on the ABC board until 1975.

== Personal life and honours ==
Edwards had two sons with her husband Rex Edwards, whom she married in 1933. She died on 9 March 2006 at the age of 98.

Edwards was appointed Officer of the Order of the British Empire (OBE) in 1958 and promoted to CBE in 1979. She was made an honorary freeman of the City of Launceston in 1984 and entered on the Tasmanian Honour Roll of Women in 2005.
