= List of mayors of Launceston =

Mayor of Launceston
- Incumbent; Matthew Garwood since 2023
- Inaugural holder: William Stammers Button
- Formation: 1853

This is a list of the mayors of the City of Launceston, Tasmania, Australia.

== 1853–1900 ==
| # | Mayor | Term |
|---|---|---|
| 1 | William Stammers Button | 1853–1856 |
| 2 | Henry Dowling | 1857–1861 |
| 3 | John Fawns | 1862 |
| 4 | William Hart | 1863 |
| 5 | Abraham Barrett | 1864 |
| 6 | Adye Douglas | 1865–1866 |
| 7 | John Scott | 1867–1868 |
| 8 | William Hart | 1869 |
| 9 | Alexander Webster | 1870 |
| 10 | Alfred Harrap | 1871–1872 |
| 11 | John Murphy | 1873–1874 |
| 12 | Alfred Harrap | 1875–1877 |
| 13 | William Turner | 1878–1879 |
| 14 | Adye Douglas | 1880–1882 |
| 15 | Alfred Harrap | 1883 |
| 16 | Landon Fairthorne | 1884 |
| 17 | Henry Button | 1885 |
| 18 | Peter Barrett | 1886 |
| 19 | Robert Carter | 1887 |
| 20 | Bernard P.Farrelly | 1888 |
| 21 | David Scott | 1889 |
| 22 | Samuel John Sutton | 1890–1892 |
| 23 | Henry Jennings Dean | 1893 |
| 24 | Robert Henry Price | 1894 |
| 25 | Walter Henry Ferrall | 1895 |
| 26 | Peter McCrackan | 1896 |
| 27 | Robert James Sadler | 1897 |
| 28 | Samuel John Sutton | 1898 |
| 29 | Edward Henry Panton | 1899–1900 |

== 1901–2001 ==
| # | Mayor | Term |
|---|---|---|
| 30 | Frederick Kirk Fairthorne | 1901–1902 |
| 31 | David Storrer | 1903 |
| 32 | James William Pepper | 1904–1905 |
| 33 | Charles Russen | 1906 |
| 34 | Patrick Boland | 1907–1908 |
| 35 | William Clark Wilson | 1909 |
| 36 | William Claude Oldham | 1910–1911 |
| 37 | George Paton | 1912 |
| 38 | George Hills | 1913 |
| 39 | Richard Gee | 1914 |
| 40 | Frank Percy Hart | 1915–1916 |
| 41 | William Coogan | 1917–1918 |
| 42 | George Shields | 1919–1920 |
| 43 | Albert William Monds | 1921–1922 |
| 44 | George Shields | 1923 |
| 45 | Claude James | 1924 |
| 46 | John Ockerby | 1925 |
| 47 | Alexander Arthur Evans | 1926 |
| 48 | Howard Barber | 1927–1928 |
| 49 | Robert Martin Osborne | 1929–1930 |
| 50 | Frank Boatwright | 1931 |
| 51 | Albert William Monds | 1932 |
| 52 | Allen Hollingsworth | 1933–1934 |
| 53 | Eric Ernest von Bibra | 1935–1936 |
| 54 | Frank Warland Browne | 1937 |
| 55 | Albert Edwin Wyett | 1938–1939 |
| 56 | John Ockerby | 1939 |
| 57 | Frank Boatwright | 1940–1941 |
| 58 | Desmond Tasman Oldham | 1942–1943 |
| 59 | William Clark | 1944–1945 |
| 60 | Allen Hollingsworth | 1946 |
| 61 | Desmond Tasman Oldham | 1947 |
| 62 | Denham Henty | 1948–1949 |
| 63 | Allen Hollingsworth | 1950 |
| 64 | Sinclair Jeavons Thyne | 1951–1952 |
| 65 | Hedley George Pitt | 1953–1954 |
| 66 | Brian Marshall Thornley | 1955 |
| 67 | Dorothy Edwards | 1956–1957 |
| 68 | James McGowen | 1958–1959 |
| 69 | Frederick James Clark White | 1960–1961 |
| 70 | William Fry | 1962–1963 |
| 71 | Reg Turnbull | 1964–1965 |
| 72 | Clarence Gandy Pryor | 1966–1967 |
| 73 | Frank Bernard King | 1968–1969 |
| 74 | Richard Martin Green | 1970–1971 |
| 75 | Harry Medcalf Fisher | 1972–1973 |
| 76 | David Vincent Gunn | 1974–1975 |
| 77 | Thomas Dudley Room | 1975–1977 |
| 78 | Maxwell George Cleaver | 1978–1979 |
| 79 | Barbara Tweed Payne | 1980–1981 |
| 80 | Reginald Blaydon Walker | 1982–1983 |
| 81 | Don Wing | 1983–1985 |
| 82 | T.W.Deutchmann | 1985 |
| 83 | Don Wing | 1985–1986 |
| 84 | Ananias (Jimmy) Tsinoglou | 1987–1989 |
| 85 | Graeme Wesley Beams | 1990–1992 |
| 86 | Anthony( Tony) Clarence Peck | 1993–1996 |
| 87 | John Baden Lees | 1996–2001 |

== 2001–present ==
| # | Mayor | Term |
|---|---|---|
| 88 | Annette Waddle | 2001–2002 |
| 89 | Janie Dickenson | 2002–2005 |
| 90 | Ivan Dean | 2005–2007 |
| 91 | Albert Van Zetten | 2007–2022 |
| 92 | Danny Gibson | 2022–2023 |
| 93 | Matthew Garwood | 2023 - Present |
