= 7XS =

Coordinates: 42.0811°S 145.5557°E

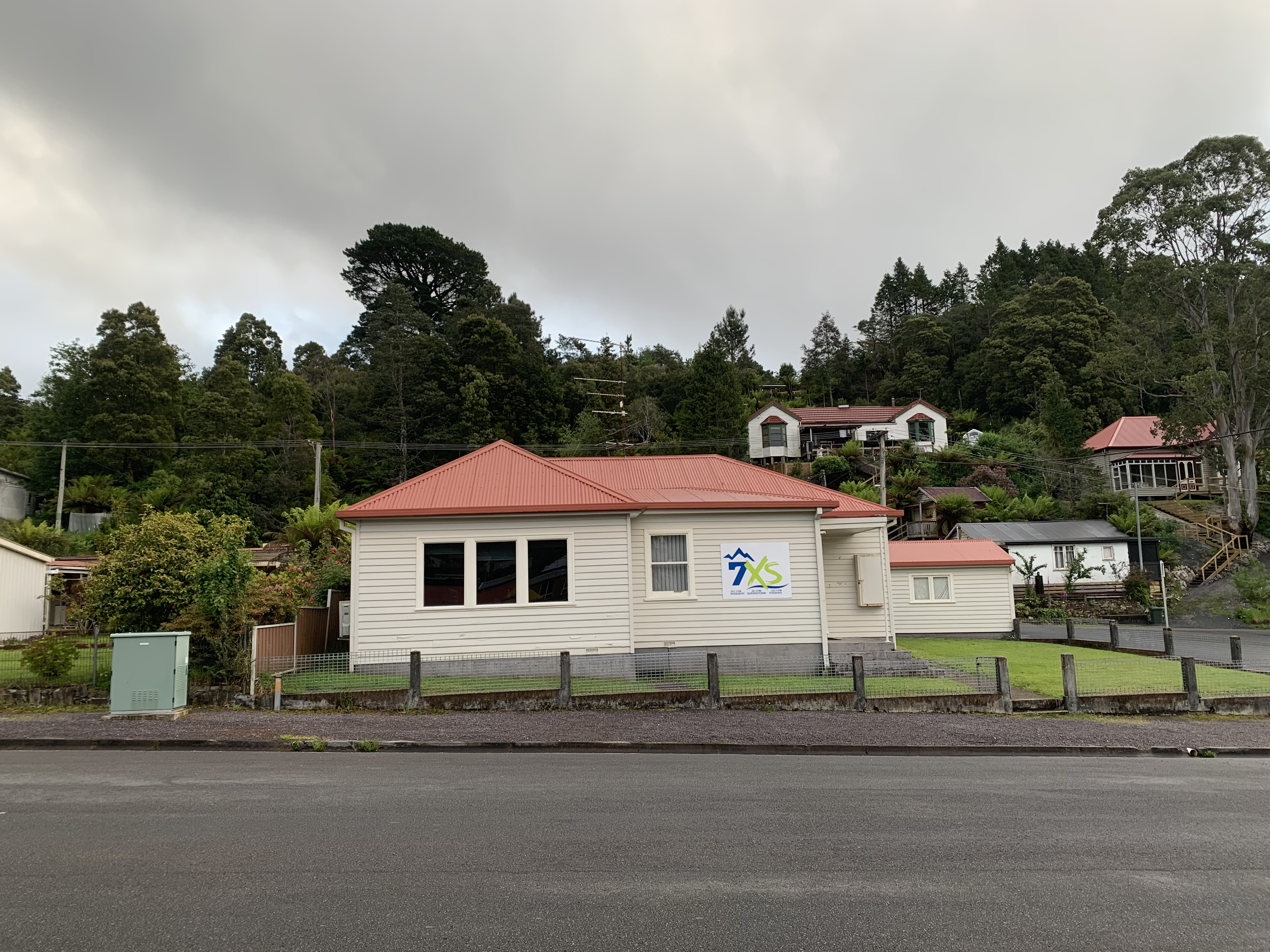
- 7XS building from Cutten Street. 2022

7XS is a radio station based in Queenstown, Tasmania, Australia, broadcasting on the FM radio band on a frequency of 92.1 MHz Queenstown, 105.1 MHz Strahan and 107.1 Rosebery on the west-coast of Tasmania.

It was opened on 29 May 1937 as with the callsign 7QT.

It was changed to 7XS on 1 October 1986

In November 2021, 7XS, along with other stations owned by Grant Broadcasters, were acquired by the Australian Radio Network. This deal allows Grant's stations, including 7XS, to access ARN's iHeartRadio platform in regional areas. The deal was finalized on 4 January 2022.

== See also ==
- List of radio station callsigns in Tasmania
