= Henry Dowling =

Australian politician

Henry Dowling (1810 – 17 September 1885) was a newspaper editor and politician in colonial Tasmania. He was the older brother of artist Robert Hawker Dowling.

Dowling was born in Gloucester, Gloucestershire, England, son of Rev. Henry Dowling Snr (1780–1869), a Baptist minister and Elizabeth Darke (1782–1853). Dowling junior was educated at the Free Grammar School, Colchester, and was afterwards apprenticed to the printing business. In 1830 he emigrated to Van Diemen's Land (later renamed to Tasmania), and was for some time on the staff of the Hobart Town Courier, but in the following year he purchased from John Pascoe Fawkner the Launceston Independent, and changing its name to the Launceston Advertiser, conducted it for some years with much success. In 1839 Dowling proceeded to England, having received the appointment of Immigration Agent for Tasmania, in which capacity he was the means of introducing into the colony many settlers whose names were well known in Northern Tasmania. In 1842 he returned to Launceston, Tasmania, and was for some years engaged in the printing and drapery business. He was one of the founders of the Launceston Savings Bank, and in 1844 was appointed manager of that institution. Dowling was always active in public affairs, and was specially prominent in the anti-transportation movement, and in the agitation for railways.

Dowling was Mayor of Launceston from 1857 to 1861, and in the latter year was elected to the Tasmanian House of Assembly as member for Launceston, but only held the seat for two years. In 1868 he accepted the secretaryship of the Launceston and Western Railway Company, and held that position until the year 1872, when this, the first of Tasmanian railways, was taken over by the Government. Amongst the works issued from Dowling's press may be mentioned an illustrated edition of the Pickwick Papers and West's History of Tasmania. Dowling died from heart failure on 17 September 1885 in Launceston, Tasmania.
