= 89.3 LAFM =

Coordinates: 41.439743°S 147.137945°E

- Launceston, Tasmania; Australia
- Broadcast area: Launceston RA1
- Frequency: 89.3 MHz

Programming
- Language: English
- Format: Adult Contemporary

Ownership
- Owner: ARN; (Bass Radio Pty Ltd)
- Sister stations: 90.1 Chilli FM

History
- First air date: 14 December 1930
- Former call signs: 7LA (1930–2008)
- Former frequencies: 1100 kHz (1930–1978); 1098 kHz (1978–2009)
- Call sign meaning: 7 for Tasmania and LA for Launceston (second A added at AM-FM conversion)

Technical information
- Licensing authority: ACMA
- ERP: 5,000 watts
- Translator: 100.3 FM Launceston CBD (200 watts)

Links
- Public licence information: Profile
- Website: 89.3 LAFM

89.3 LAFM (callsign: 7LAA) is an Australian radio station in Tasmania. Owned and operated by ARN, it broadcasts an adult contemporary format to Launceston and surrounding areas. First broadcast on 14 December 1930 as 7LA, the station currently broadcasts from studios in York Street, alongside sister station 90.1 Chilli FM. 89.3 LAFM also has a station in Scottsdale, 7SD, LAFM has a radio station in Devonport, 7AD and a radio station in Burnie, 7BU

== History ==
Established as 7LA in 1930, the station was formerly operated under various networks, including AWA, 3KZ, RG Capital and Macquarie Regional RadioWorks. In 1978, the station shifted frequency to 1098 AM as part of a nationwide frequency move on the AM band, changing from 10 kHz spacing to 9 kHz.

In 2002, television station ABNT-3 vacated VHF channel 3, opening up space for further FM radio services in Launceston. In 2005, it was announced that 7LA, along with 7EX and ABC Northern Tasmania were to move to the FM band - 7LA on 89.3, 7EX on 90.1 and ABC Northern Tasmania on 91.7. In 2008, the station relaunched as 89.3 LAFM, with the AM service ceasing transmission in February 2009.

Today, the station networks the majority of its programming to Scottsdale-based 7SD.

In November 2021, 89.3 LAFM, along with other stations owned by Grant Broadcasters, were acquired by the Australian Radio Network. This deal will allow Grant's stations, including LAFM, to access ARN's iHeartRadio platform in regional areas. The deal was finalised on 4 January 2022. It is expected LAFM will integrate with ARN's Pure Gold Network, but will retain its current name according to the press release from ARN.
