= Tasmanian Times =

Hobart, Tasmania based online newspaper

Tasmanian Times is an online news service in Hobart in Tasmania, Australia. An earlier Tasmanian Times existed in the nineteenth century (1867–1870).

It has been published for most of the 2000s by Lindsay Tuffin.
