= Hobart FM =

Radio station in Tasmania, Australia

Hobart FM (7THE)
- Hobart, Tasmania; Australia
- Frequencies: Droughty Hill: 92.1 MHz; Mt Faulkner: 96.1 MHz

Programming
- Format: Community radio

Ownership
- Owner: Hobart FM Inc.

History
- First air date: 13 April 1977

Technical information
- Licensing authority: ACMA
- ERP: Mt Faulkner: 3,000 watts; Droughty Hill: 100 watts
- Transmitter coordinates: 42.787176°S 147.194258°E

Links
- Public licence information: Profile
- Website: hobartfm.org.au

Hobart FM (call sign 7THE) is a community radio station in Hobart, Tasmania, Australia, broadcasting on 96.1 MHz from Mt Faulkner and 92.1 MHz from Droughty Hill serving northern Hobart. Its output targets listeners 50 and over and includes specialist programs.

== History ==
Hobart FM Incorporated applied for and was granted a Public Radio Licence in 1977 under the auspices of the Tasmanian College of Advanced Education at Mount Nelson.

Originally using the call sign 7CAE FM the station became the first FM radio station in Tasmania (it was briefly preceded by "ABC FM", but this station was broadcast from mainland Australia).

Initially the station followed a similar format to "ABC FM" - i.e. classical - but rock, folk and other genres began to creep into its schedule.

7 CAE FM broadcast a wide range of specialist programs, and by the early 1980s was heavily rock-oriented. It changed its callsign to "THE FM" (used along with 92 FM depending on the whim of individual announcers) in April 1982.

Following the college's relocation to Launceston in 1980, Hobart FM Inc. assumed the full responsibility in the running of the station, subsequently moving premises to the McCann's Building in the Hobart CBD in the mid-1980s, where it continued to operate a lively and alternative radio service.

In March 1992 the station re-located to 17 Alma Street, Bellerive, where it has remained to this date (2021). At around this time the programming became less rock-oriented and began to gravitate towards country rock, though it continued its role as Community Broadcaster in line with specialist music programs, community access and multicultural presentations, as well as information programs covering a wide and varied range of subjects.

In 2016 Hobart FM broadened its music policy.

== Programme philosophy ==
Hobart FM's broadcasts are eclectic and broad ranging. Briefly, the station aims to cater for the information needs and music tastes of those not catered for by the commercial and public broadcasters in Hobart. From country to classical, soul music to psychedelia, classics from the 1960s to today's Top 40 hits, there is a large array of musical styles represented across the programme schedule, with special attention given to local artists and ethnic-language broadcasts. Hobart FM enables the voice of individuals and minority groups to be heard throughout the wider Hobart community.

== Broadcast area ==
Hobart FM transmits its primary signal (96.1 MHz) from an antenna site on Mount Faulkner which allows for coverage in the Hobart City area, Sandy Bay through to Moonah, Glenorchy, Clarence including Lauderdale, Rokeby, South Arm, Municipality of Kingborough, Bridgewater, Gagebrook, Brighton, Sorell and Richmond with its signal reaching far beyond these points. Hobart FM also broadcasts on 92.1 MHz in the southern suburbs and Channel area, eliminating many of the "blackspots" created by Hobart's geographic layout.

In 2019 it commenced broadcasting on Hobart's DAB+ service.

== Management structure ==
Hobart FM is a Public Radio Station operated by Hobart FM Inc; which is a community-based, non-profit organization. The station is administered by a committee of management consisting of ten people elected by the association's members at an annual general meeting. Although the committee is entrusted with the overall management of the station, Hobart FM could not operate without the services of some sixty or so active volunteers who undertake a range of tasks from broadcasting and production to clerical and fundraising activities. The reliance on volunteer involvement not only enables Hobart FM to operate on a tight budget, but facilitates direct community participation in the operation of the station.

== Financial sources ==
Hobart FM receives income from four main sources:

- Government grants through the Community Broadcasting Foundation for operational costs and equipment purchases,
- Membership subscription and donations,
- General fundraising,
- Sponsorship.
