= Prince's Square =

Park in Launceston, Tasmania, Australia

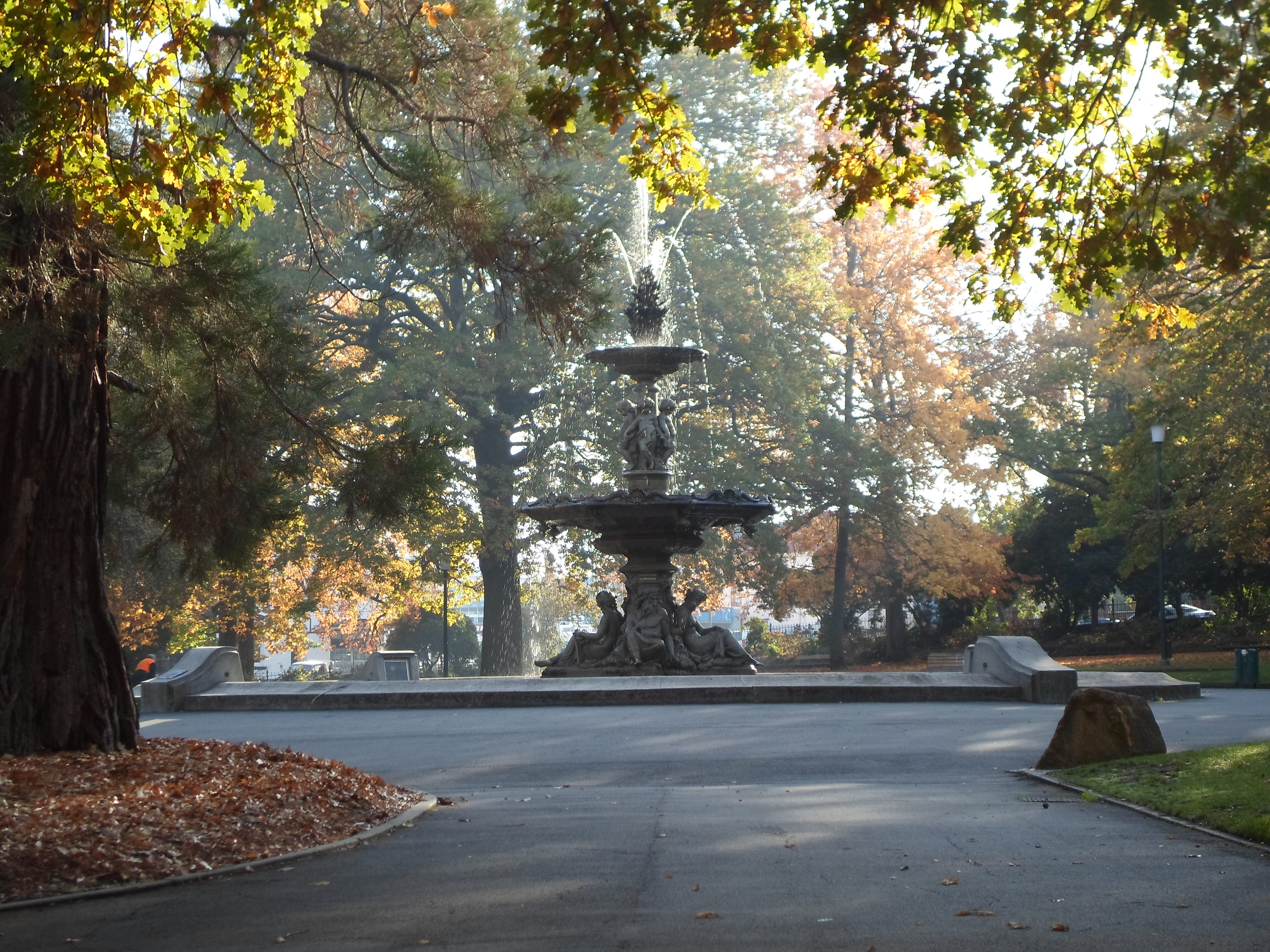
- The Val d'Osne Fountain in the central axis of the park
- Interactive map of Prince's Square
- Type: Public Park
- Location: South-Central Business District of Launceston, Tasmania
- Coordinates: 41.4405°S 147.1404°E
- Area: 1.25 hectares (3.1 acres)
- Opened: 1858
- Operator: City of Launceston
- Status: Open
- Paths: Sealed paths
- Terrain: valley floor, former clay pit
- Water: fountain
- Vegetation: European and exotic species
- Public transit: Car, Bus
- Facilities: Toilets, Picnic areas, drinking fountain

Prince's Square is a park in Launceston, Tasmania, Australia. Established in 1858 from a disused brickfield it is now an important part of cultural life in Launceston and also a heritage park. The park is known for its symmetrical planning and the bronze gilded Val d'Osne Fountain. The park is bound on all four sides by Elizabeth Street, St John Street, Frederick Street and Charles Street.

== History ==
Reserved as a public space in 1826 under the name 'St John's Square', the site was first used as a clay pit for the construction of local buildings when the settlement of Launceston went from rough timber cottages to the first permanent brick buildings in the late 1810s. From 1824 to 1828, the new brickfield was notably used to supply bricks for St John's Anglican Church, the first church to be built in Launceston and immediately opposite the square from which it was built. As the clay for the rapidly expanding settlement began to be sourced from newer brickfields along Glen Dhu Rivulet to the southwest, the vacant pit saw use as a temporary rubbish dump for residents of the area until 1843 when it was acquired for use as a parade ground for soldiers stationed in Launceston. Encouraged by the presence of St Johns Church and the newly built Milton Hall tabernacle in 1842 also overlooking the site, people began to build around the square and the site began to see use as a local recreational space and meeting point.

In 1851, St John's Square was the site of an election between two candidates of the new Legislative Council in Van Diemen's Land. Two years later in 1853 when Launceston was granted status as a municipality and Reverend John West and the Anti-Transportation League ended convict transportation to Van Diemen's Land, a great congregation was held in the square to announce the declaration. With the growing sense of civic pride that followed, the Municipal Council set about transforming the square into a grand and stately place aimed at the gentry of the city. In 1858, the Municipal Council applied to the Launceston Horticultural Society for curator Thomas Wade to design the new park. Both the residents of the city and the horticultural society were involved in the works which involved the setting out of paths, fencing and trees including an assortment of Oaks, two Sequoias and a mixture of exotic shrubbery. The iconic fountain was installed a year later in 1859 towards the completion of the works. The official opening of the new square was held on 9 November 1859 in a celebration to commemorate the coming of age for the Prince of Wales.

In 1868, the Duke of Edinburgh visited Launceston where he planted two Oak trees and a massive celebration was held in the Square featuring a choir, candlelight and background illumination from the city's new town gas supply. The event saw the name changed from the former 'St John's Square' to 'Prince's Square' to commemorate the momentous event.

== Val d'Osne Fountain ==
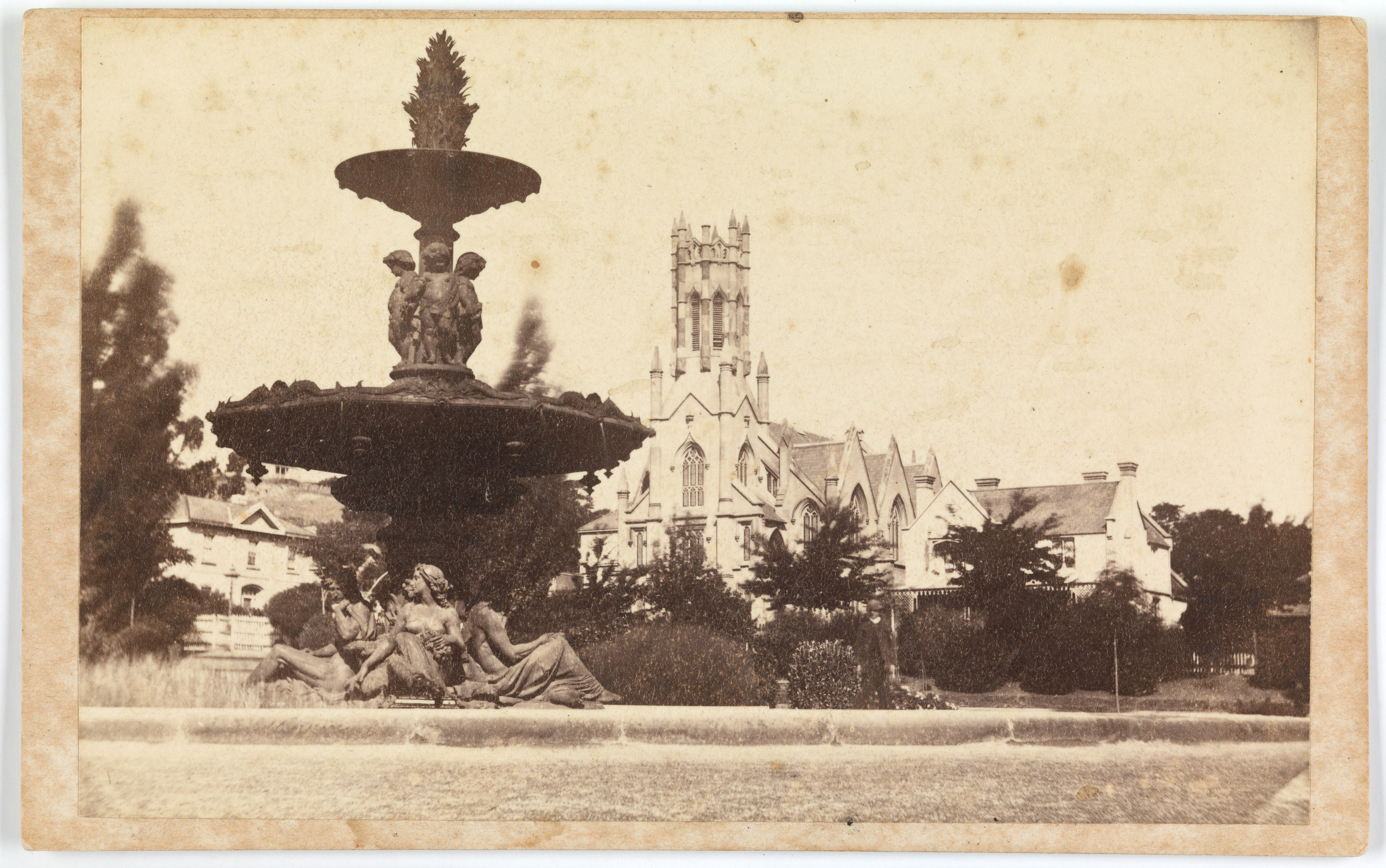
The Prince's Square Fountain c. 1863

Standing at 7 meters high and the focal point of Prince's Square, the iconic Val d'Osne Fountain sits at the center of the park at the meeting point of the main pathways. First exhibited in the Paris Industrial Exhibition of 1855 as the show-piece for Barbezat & Co., proprietors of the foundries of Val d'Osne, the fountain was purchased by the Municipal Council in 1859 to commemorate the completion of Launceston's town water scheme in 1857. The design of the fountain was the work of the distinguished French artist M.Lienard with the 4 main base statues depicting Neptune, Galatea, Amphitrite and Acis being sculpted by M.Moreau.

=== Urban Legends ===
A popular local myth regarding the Val d'Osne Fountain is that it itself was an accident and was never intended to have been sent to Launceston. As the myth states, Launceston in Cornwall, England bought the fountain and had it shipped from France but due to the shared names of the two towns, the fountain was accidentally posted to Launceston in 'Cornwall Shire', Tasmania. Due to the high shipping costs of returning it, the fountain was then placed in the new square as the council did not know what else to do with it. Whilst the legend is not supported by historians and defies historic records of purchase, the myth itself was likely based around an article in a local newspaper whereby the 'Cornwall Chronicle' of 26 February 1859 pointed out the low price of around 40-50 pounds that the council reported having spent which seemed to go against what would have been expected for a fountain of its stature.

A lesser known urban myth pertains to the originality of top piece of the fountain. The myth states that the original portrayed a half-naked nymph which was scorned by the citizens of the city as being too rude and so it was replaced by a 'pineapple'. The myth itself is flawed by the fact that the top piece of the fountain is actually a sheaf of reeds and that the catalogue from which the council made the original purchase clearly displays the top piece that is in situ today.

== Churches ==
Prince's Square also has the highest concentration of churches in the city with a total of 5 churches facing the square, two with rectories/manses also visible. Starting with the construction of St Johns Church in 1824, various sites around the square were developed as the area opened up, a number of which were chosen as sites for churches and related buildings connected to the Christian faith. Listed in chronological order of construction, the churches are:

- 1824 St John's Church
- 1841 St John's Square Congregational Chapel (Milton Hall)
- 1859 Chalmers' Presbyterian Church
- 1883 Christ Church Congregational Church (now City Baptist Church)
- 1939 Gospel Hall

== See also ==
- Royal eponyms in Canada
