= ABC Northern Tasmania =

Australia
- Broadcast area: Northern Tasmania
- Frequency: 91.7 MHz FM (2006–)

Programming
- Format: Talk

Ownership
- Owner: Australian Broadcasting Corporation

History
- First air date: 3 August 1935
- Former frequencies: 710 kHz (1935–1978); 711 kHz (1978–2006)
- Call sign meaning: 7 – Tasmania NT – Northern Tasmania

Technical information
- Transmitter coordinates: 41°26′25.01″S 147°08′49.30″E

Links
- Website: https://www.abc.net.au/northtas

ABC Northern Tasmania (call sign: 7NT) is the ABC Local Radio station for northern Tasmania, based in Launceston, owned by the Australian Broadcasting Corporation. It broadcasts on the frequency of 91.7 MHz on the FM band from Mount Barrow at a power of 192 kW which covers much of Northern Tasmania.

In addition, the station has many low power repeater stations across the state including:

- Bicheno 89.7 MHz
- Burnie 102.5 MHz
- Devonport 100.5 MHz
- Fingal 1161 kHz AM
- King Island 88.6 MHz
- Lileah 91.3 MHz
- Queenstown/Zeehan 90.5 MHz
- Rosebery 106.3 MHz
- Savage River 104.1 MHz
- St Helens 1584 kHz AM
- St Marys 102.7 MHz
- Strahan 107.5 MHz
- Swansea 106.1 MHz
- Waratah 103.3 MHz
- Weldborough 97.3 MHz
- Launceston CBD 102.7 MHz

== History ==
ABC Northern Tasmania was the ABC radio's first regional station in Launceston. It was opened by Prime Minister Joseph Lyons on 3 August 1935.

7NT moved from AM (711 kHz) to FM (91.7 MHz) in 2006.
