= The Examiner (Tasmania) =

Daily paper in Launceston, Tasmania, Australia

- Front page
- Type: Daily newspaper
- Format: Tabloid
- Owner: Australian Community Media
- Editor: Craig Thomson
- Founded: 12 March 1842
- Headquarters: 113 Cimitiere Street, Launceston, Tasmania, Australia
- Website: examiner.com.au

The Examiner is the daily newspaper of the city of Launceston and north-eastern Tasmania, Australia.

== Overview ==
The Examiner was first published on 12 March 1842, founded by James Aikenhead. The Reverend John West was also instrumental in establishing the newspaper and was the first editorial writer. Initially, The Examiner was published weekly on Saturdays. Six months later, it began publishing on Wednesdays as well. In 1853, the paper changed to tri-weekly editions, on Tuesdays, Thursdays and Saturdays, and first began daily publication on 10 April 1866. That frequency lasted until 16 February the following year. Tri-weekly publication then resumed and continued until 21 December 1877, after which daily publication returned.

== Associated publications ==
The Weekly Courier was published in Launceston by the company from 1901 to 1935. Another weekly paper (evening) The Saturday Evening Express was published between 1924 and 1984 when it transformed into The Sunday Examiner a title which continues to this day.

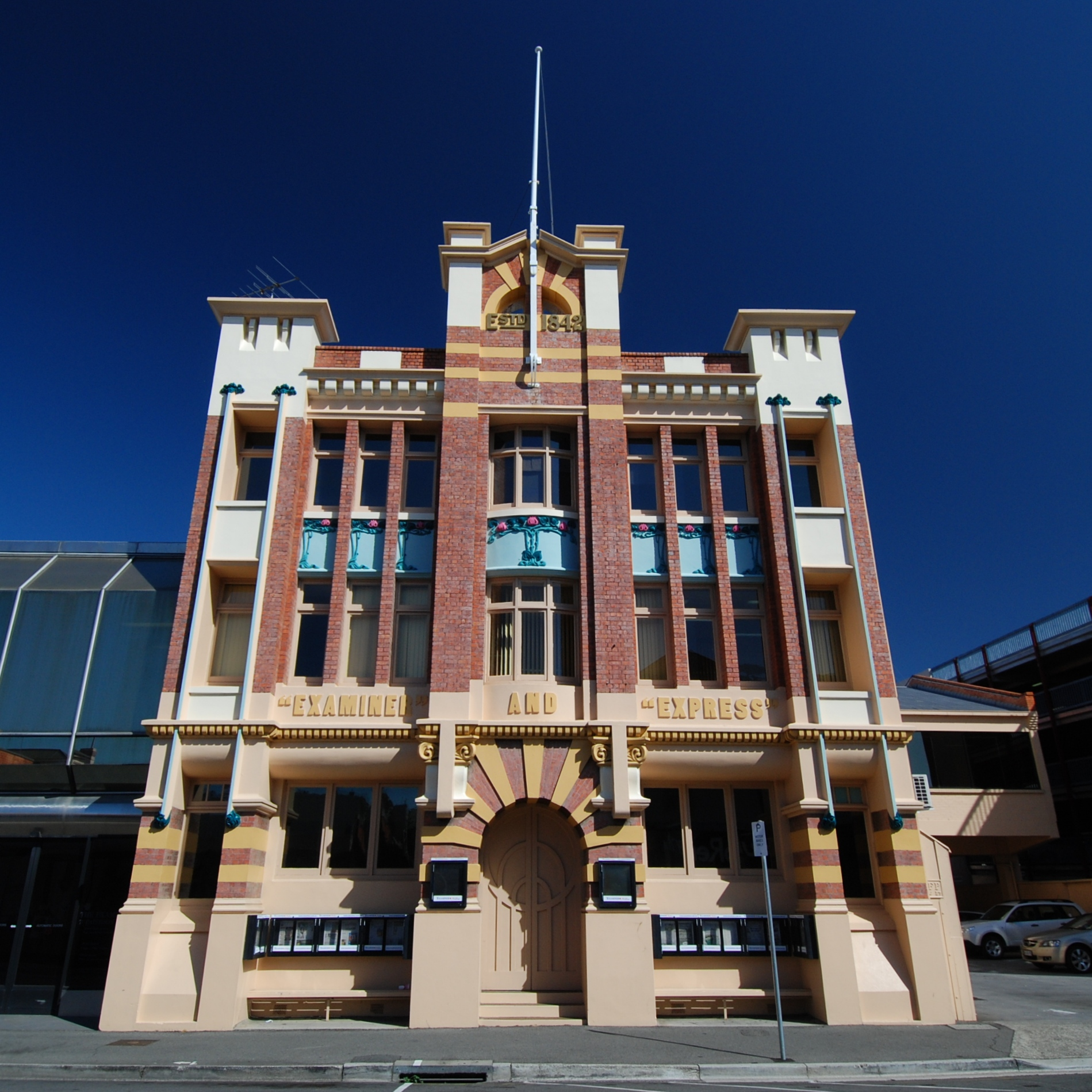
The Examiner building in Launceston

== Ownership ==
Once owned by ENT Limited, The Examiner was owned by the Rural Press group and is now part of Australian Community Media.

The current editor is Craig Thomson.

== Readership ==
For the 12 months ending September 2008, Roy Morgan Research reports a Saturday readership of 100,000 and a Monday-Friday readership of 84,000.

== See also ==
- List of newspapers in Australia
