= Gary Evans (serial killer) =

American serial killer

- Mugshot (New York State Police)
- Born: Gary Charles Evans; October 7, 1954; Troy, New York, U.S.
- Died: August 14, 1998 (aged 43); Menands Bridge, New York, U.S.
- Cause of death: Suicide by jumping
- Penalty: None (died before trial)

Details
- Victims: 5
- Span of crimes: February 1985 – October 1997
- Country: United States
- State: New York
- Date apprehended: May 27, 1998

Gary Charles Evans (October 7, 1954 – August 14, 1998) was an American thief and confessed serial killer in and around the Capital District, New York. His penchant for stealing antiques and his multiple escapes from custody — including one that ended in his death — made him headline news in the area on numerous occasions.

== Early years ==
Gary Charles Evans was born on October 7, 1954, in Troy, New York to Roy and Flora Mae Evans (née Lee). Evans and his sister, Robbie, grew up in an unstable home with physical abuse from their father that was targeted at both the children and their mother. Amid this, the children also experienced their mother's suicide attempts. Evans himself would later claim that he was raped by his father when he was eight. From an early age, Gary began to show interest in works of art and pricy items, and at the age of 8, he was caught stealing jewellery worth $1,000; later on, during his school years, he began repeatedly stealing small items such as books and comics, in addition to occasionally shoplifting, which earned him a reputation as a thief.

After his parents divorced in 1968, Evans and his mother moved to Cohoes, where he attended the local high school. In the summer of 1970, he was arrested for breaking and entering, for which he was sent to a juvenile detention center for three months. While he was imprisoned, his mother married and subsequently divorced four husbands due to her alcohol abuse, and in 1971, she unexpectedly came out as lesbian. After his release, Evans left his mother's home due to frequent quarreling, dropped out of school and began living as a vagrant. In the mid-1970s, he returned to Troy, where, together with his childhood friends Michael Falco and Timothy "Tim" Rysedorph, rented an apartment and got a job.

== Criminal career ==
On January 13, 1977, Evans was arrested for trespassing and stealing property in Lake Placid, for which he was given a 4-year sentence in the Clinton Correctional Facility in Dannemora. While he was detained, his father, Roy, died of throat cancer.

In 1979, he was transferred to the Great Meadow Correctional Facility in Comstock, from where he was paroled on March 21, 1980. He then returned to his shared apartment in Troy, and soon after, together with Falco and Rysedorph, he began committing robberies and thefts, using the apartment as a storage space to sell the stolen goods. In June 1980, Evans was arrested for theft and imprisoned at the Old Rensselaer County Jail, but with the help of several Hells Angels members, he managed to escape. Just five hours later, however, he was recaptured, and on September 21, he was returned to the Clinton Correctional Facility to serve out his full sentence, as he had broken the conditions of his parole.

In 1982, following a brawl between inmates, Evans was transferred to the Attica Correctional Facility, where he remained until his release on December 29. The following January, Evans and Falco committed several petty thefts, after which they both moved to Florida. A month later, Evans' mother died in an accident, forcing the two men to return to New York State and resume their criminal activities together with Rysedorph. On May 10, 1983, Evans was arrested for burglary and trespassing in Saratoga County, and briefly housed in the county jail. Throughout the rest of the year, he was repeatedly transferred to various prisons, but was never brought to trial and was eventually released in March 1984. In January 1985, Rysedorph ceased all contact with Evans, who continued his criminal career only with the help of Falco.

On February 16, 1985, Evans and Falco robbed an antique collector's apartment in East Greenbush, with their profit being around $15,000. In April, Evans stole the car of two drug traffickers and sold it for $12,000, but the victims were able to identify him, which resulted in his arrest in Cohoes. Evans accepted a plea deal with the prosecutors in exchange for a commutation of his sentence, admitting his guilt in the robbery and illegal possession of weaponry. He was released on probation, pledging that he would stop stealing and find himself a real job, but by July of that year, he would commit his first murder.

In the last days of July, Evans built an improvised silencer for his pistol, which he then used to kill his accomplice Michael Falco at their shared apartment in Troy, dismembering the body with a chainsaw. He then called Rysedorph to help him get rid of the body, to which the latter agreed, stuffing it in a sleeping bag and driving it to Evans' sister's home in Lake Worth Corridor, Florida, where they buried it in the backyard. The motive for the murder was revenge, as Rysedorph had told Gary that Falco had been profiting off their loot by selling them for themselves; in actuality, Rysedorph blamed Falco for what he himself has been doing. The two criminals remained in Lake Worth Corridor for about six weeks before returning to New York, whereupon Evans was again arrested for violating his parole and sentenced to 4 years imprisonment at Sing Sing.

While in prison, Evans became friends with infamous serial killer David Berkowitz over their mutual interest in bodybuilding. In December 1987, Evans got into a fight with another prisoner serving a sentence for child molestation, for which he was placed in solitary confinement for several months. On March 1, 1988, Evans was once again released, and shortly after, he befriended 27-year-old thief Damien Cuomo, with whom he began committing crimes.

Between March 1988 and September 1989, Evans and Cuomo pulled off many successful thefts and robberies, honing their skills in the process. The pair were arrested in March 1989, with police finding ski masks, stun guns, radio scanners and ropes in the back of their car, but due to lack of sufficient evidence, both were released. On September 8, 1989, while robbing a store in Watertown, Evans shot and killed 63-year-old secondhand shop owner Douglas Berry, before he and Cuomo stole items worth $15,000. The pair left no viable evidence behind, and the investigators were left without any possible leads.

On December 29, fearing that Cuomo, who had begun to experience depressive episodes, might snitch on him, Evans shot and killed him. In early 1990, he moved back to Florida, where he remained for several weeks before moving on to California, where he came across a female acquaintance he had known for 15 years. Not long after, Evans was arrested for threatening the woman and her husband after the former refused to have sex with him. Since he faced the possibility of criminal liability, Evans accepted the proposal of leaving the state in exchange for no charges being pressed against him, after which he returned to New York.

On October 17, 1991, Evans killed 36-year-old secondhand shop owner Gregory Jouben, before stealing several items and selling them for $60,000 in total. He then decided to get rid of the murder weapon, which he buried at the Albany Rural Cemetery in Menands. While there, he also dismantled a 500 kg marble tombstone, which he also successfully sold. After the murder of Jouben, Evans decided to quit his criminal career and get a job. Over the next several years, he worked as a day laborer, only occasionally committing petty thefts. In January 1994, he was arrested for looting and vandalism for stealing and selling the marble tombstone, for which he was ordered to serve a month at the Albany County Jail.

After his release, he moved to Vermont, where he lived a survivalist lifestyle in a tent. In early 1993, he stole cuff links worth $1,500 from a group shop in Quechee, and later broke into the Norman Williams Library in Woodstock, Vermont and stole a valuable book titled The Birds of America. Over the next few months, he attempted to find a buyer, but with the help of informants, police tracked him down in June 1994 and arrested him. Evans was threatened with life imprisonment, but since he revealed where he had kept the book and returned it intact, he was given only 24 months, which he served at an undisclosed prison in Vermont. He was paroled on June 6, 1996, and returned to New York, where he renewed his partnership with Tim Rysedorph. The criminals then rented a storage room in Colonie, where they would keep their tools and stolen goods. However, knowing that Rysedorph had been an accomplice in Falco's killing way back in 1985, Evans became paranoid that his friend would tell on him, and so, on October 3, 1997, he shot and killed Rysedorph. In order to get rid of the corpse, he dismembered it and buried the remains in a wooded area, additionally disposing of the murder weapon. Shortly afterwards, he fled New York, again violating his parole, for which he was listed as a wanted fugitive.

== Arrest and confessions ==
On May 27, 1998, Evans surrendered himself at the police station in St. Johnsbury, Vermont, confessing that he had committed several murders. At his subsequent interrogation, he claimed that he was prompted to do so out of feelings of guilt, as he had watched Rysedorph's 9-year-old son become aggressive and withdrawn since his father's disappearance. On June 24, he described in detail each of the killings, and revealed the burial sites for both Falco and Rysedorph, whose bodies were later found at the indicated locations in July.

== Death ==
On August 12, 1998, Evans was arraigned at the Rensselaer County District Court and charged with three of the murders. He was then transferred to the Albany County Jail, where he was charged with federal parole violations. He was transported to the James T. Foley Federal Courthouse to be sentenced on the parole violations. Upon completion of the court hearing, while en route to the Rensselaer County Jail and crossing the Menands Bridge, Evans, despite being in manacles and chained, used a secret key hidden in his nose to free himself. He then broke the window of the transport van and jumped out. He was quickly cornered by Deputy U.S. Marshal's, but managed to run to the fence and leaped into the Hudson River, hitting the shallows below which caused him fatal head injuries. Due to the circumstances, his death was ruled a suicide.

A number of acquaintances, including Evans' lawyer and investigator Jim Horton, who had known him since the 1970s when he investigated the robberies, later stated that Evans had planned to kill himself long before the incident, having sent them suicide notes in which he expressed remorse and his inability to deal with isolation. According to his close friends, despite his criminal activities, they considered Evans to have a complex worldview and philosophy, a vegetarian who never drank nor smoked.

== Media ==
Evans' life is dramatized in the season 1, episode 8 of I Killed My BFF titled "My Best Friend the Serial Killer". Several authors have also written books on the case.

== See also ==
- List of prison escapes
- List of serial killers in the United States

== Bibliography ==
- M. William Phelps (February 1, 2012). Every Move You Make. Pinnacle. ISBN 978-0786031764.
- Gregg Olsen and M. William Phelps (May 6, 2014). Nothing This Evil Ever Dies: The Secret Letters Son of Sam Never Wanted You to See. Crime Rant Classics. ASIN B00NPBH58G.
