= New York State Route 377 =

State highway in Albany County, New York, US

New York State Route 377
- Map of Albany County in eastern New York with NY 377 highlighted in red

Route information
- Maintained by NYSDOT and the city of Albany
- Length: 1.76 mi (2.83 km)
- Existed: mid-1930s–present

Major junctions
- South end: US 9 in Albany
- North end: NY 378 in Menands

Location
- Country: United States
- State: New York
- Counties: Albany

Highway system
- New York Highways; Interstate; US; State; Reference; Parkways
← NY 376	→ NY 378

New York State Route 377 (NY 377) is a north–south state highway located within Albany County, New York, in the United States. The four-lane route extends for 1.76 miles (2.83 km) through mostly residential areas from an interchange with U.S. Route 9 (US 9) in the city of Albany to an intersection with NY 378 in the village of Menands. NY 377 was assigned to its current alignment in the mid-1930s.

== Route description ==
NY 377 begins adjacent to Albany Memorial Hospital at an interchange with US 9 in the city of Albany. The highway initially heads to the northeast as a four-lane, city-maintained road, following Northern Boulevard along the south side of Wolfert's Roost Country Club and the northern edge of a housing tract. After a quarter-mile (0.4 km), the route turns northward onto Van Rensselaer Boulevard, another four-lane street divided by a narrow median. The route runs past two blocks of homes before leaving the Albany city limits and becoming state-maintained as it crosses into the town of Colonie and its village of Menands. Within Menands, NY 377 traverses another mile (1.6 km) of housing tracts before ending at an intersection with NY 378 (Menand Road) northwest of the village center. The northern terminus of NY 377 also serves as the south entrance to Albany Rural Cemetery.

== History ==
On April 30, 1919, the state of New York awarded a contract to improve the portion of Van Rensselaer Boulevard north of the Albany city limits to state highway standards. The project cost $33,796 to complete (equivalent to $612,934 in 2024), and the rebuilt road was added to the state highway system on November 11, 1919, as unsigned State Highway 1518 (SH 1518). It did not have a posted route number until the mid-1930s when SH 1518 became part of NY 377, a new route continuing south to the intersection of Northern Boulevard and Loudonville Road in Albany by way of city-owned streets. The alignment of NY 377 has not changed since that time; however, the junction at the south end of the route was reconfigured into an interchange when the portion of US 9 in northern Albany was converted into a limited-access highway in the 1970s.

== Major intersections ==
The entire route is in Albany County.

Location	mi	km	Destinations	Notes
Albany	0.00	0.00	US 9 to I-90	Interchange; southern terminus
Menands	1.76	2.83	NY 378 – Loudonville, Menands	Northern terminus; access to Albany Rural Cemetery
1.000 mi = 1.609 km; 1.000 km = 0.621 mi: Incomplete access
