= Troy Gas Light Company =

- U.S. National Register of Historic Places
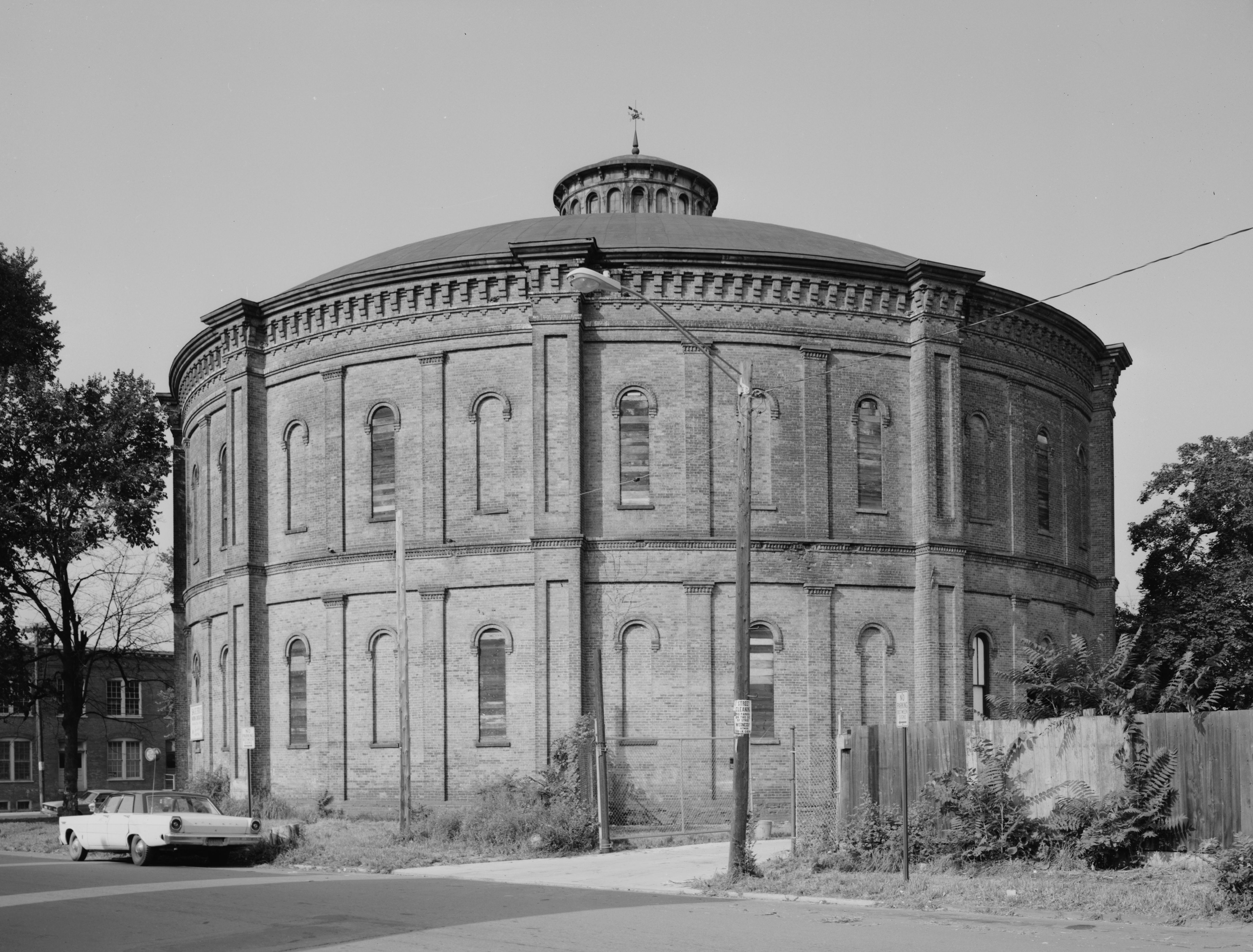
- Troy Gas Light Company Gasholder

- Location within New York Location within the United States
- Location: Troy, New York, USA
- Coordinates: 42°43′17″N 73°41′26″W
- Built: 1873
- Architect: Frederick A. Sabbaton
- NRHP reference No.: 71000556
- Added to NRHP: February 18, 1971

The Troy Gas Light Company was a gas lighting company in Troy, New York, United States. The Troy Gasholder Building is one of only ten or so remaining examples of a type of building that was common in Northeastern urban areas during the 19th century. It was designed by Frederick A. Sabbaton, a prominent gas engineer in New York State. Originally sheltering a telescoping iron storage tank for coal gas, the brick gasholder house is an imposing structure from a significant period in the history of Troy. For twenty-seven years the company held a monopoly on the manufacture of illuminating gas in the city.

== Troy gasholder ==
The Troy gasholder was a telescoping two-lift type. Its top section had a diameter of 100 feet (30 m) and a height of 22 feet (6.7 m). The lower section of the telescoping lift had a diameter of 101 feet, 6 inches, and a height of 22 feet (6.7 m). Its storage capacity was 333,000 cubic feet (9,400 m^{3}) of gas. The gasholder's weight provided pressure for the distribution of gas in the supply mains. The gasholder pressure was 4½ inches of water column. The pressure was measured in inches, in terms of a height of column of water, as it was too low to measure in the more conventional pounds per square inch.

== Troy Gas Light physical plant ==
The gasholder house was one part of the complex comprising Troy Gas Light's physical plant. The main elements of the production facilities were two blocks north of the gasholder house, in a block bounded by Liberty Street, Fifth Avenue, and Washington Street, bounded by the tracks of the New York Central, the former site of the Little Italy Farmers Market.

Extending along Fifth Avenue to Liberty Street was a rectangular brick coal shed, 200 feet (61 m) by 34 feet (10 m), with iron doors along Fifth Avenue and a wooden cornice measuring 28 feet (8.5 m).

Adjoining the south end of the coal shed was the retort house, trapezoidal in plan, measuring 200 feet (61 m) by 50 feet (15 m), with its longitudinal axis running east to west. A brick structure with iron roof beams, it measured 22 feet (6.7 m) to the cornice. The retort house, the core of the operations, was where coal was burned to produce a crude form of the gas.

Fronting Hill Street and adjoining the retort building at its southwest corner was the condenser building. This small rectangular building was 10 by 20 feet (6.1 m) with a brick façade. The condensers separated coal tar from the crude gas.

Adjoining the condenser building on the north was the exhauster building, which housed exhausters (pumps) that forced gas through the system into the holders. A 12-horsepower engine drove the exhausters. Off the north side of this building was another small building housing a 75-horsepower steam boiler. Both of these buildings were single-story.

In the open space in the middle of the block north of the retort house, and west of the coal shed, were two iron gas holders, each 50 feet (15 m) in diameter, neither contained in a gasholder house.

At the northwest corner of the property was the purifying building where sulfur was removed from the gas. It was a two-story brick structure measuring 35 by 49 feet (15 m). Adjoining it on the south was a two-story building containing the meters and steam-heated offices.

At the south end of the property was another coal shed, built of brick and 24 feet (7.3 m) high. A tar well was also located here. The company also had coal on a dock at the foot of Division Street, seven blocks away; and there was an additional coal shed, 100 feet (30 m) by 30 feet (9.1 m), 130 feet (40 m) to the north of the gasholder house. In the 1870s, the company burned gas coal supplied by Freeman Butts of Cleveland, Ohio.

== Frederick A. Sabbaton, engineer of the Troy gasholder ==
Frederick A. Sabbaton (1830–1894), was a specialist in the construction of gas works, and was the superintendent of the Troy Gas Light Company, from 1862 to 1890. Sabbaton worked extensively in New York State, and came from a family of engineers. His father, Paul A. Sabbation, was a close friend of Robert Fulton, prepared plans and specifications for The Clermont. Frederick Sabbaton's two brothers, and two sons were all employed as gas engineers. Sabboton supervised, constructed, and owned gas works in Connecticut, Massachusetts, and throughout New York State. He was also involved in the manufacturing of aniline dye, made from coal tar, and designed a gas governor valve.

== Troy Gas Light Company ==
The Troy Gas Light Company first supplied illuminating gas in 1848. They maintained a monopoly on the manufacturing of gas until 1875, when the Troy Citizens Gas Light Company was founded. Ten years later, in 1885, additional competition from the Troy Fuel Gas company was created by the founding of this company. On October 11, 1889, these three companies were consolidated to form the Troy Gas Company. In about 1893, the Troy Electric Light Company (founded 1886), was merged into the Troy Gas Company. Additionally, in 1908, the Beacon Electric Company was merged into the company. In the 1926, the Troy Gas Company, joined with the Mohawk Hudson Power Corporation, which in turn joined with the Niagara-Hudson Power Corporation in 1929.

The gasholder house was in operation in 1912, and taken out of service during the 1920s when a new central plant was built in Menands, NY. In the 1930s, the gasholder was removed and sold as scrap metal. The gasholder house has been used for storage by a circus manager, and for marching practice by local bands. It is currently used for storage and a garage, as well as occasional music and arts presentations.

== Half-Elevation and truss details ==
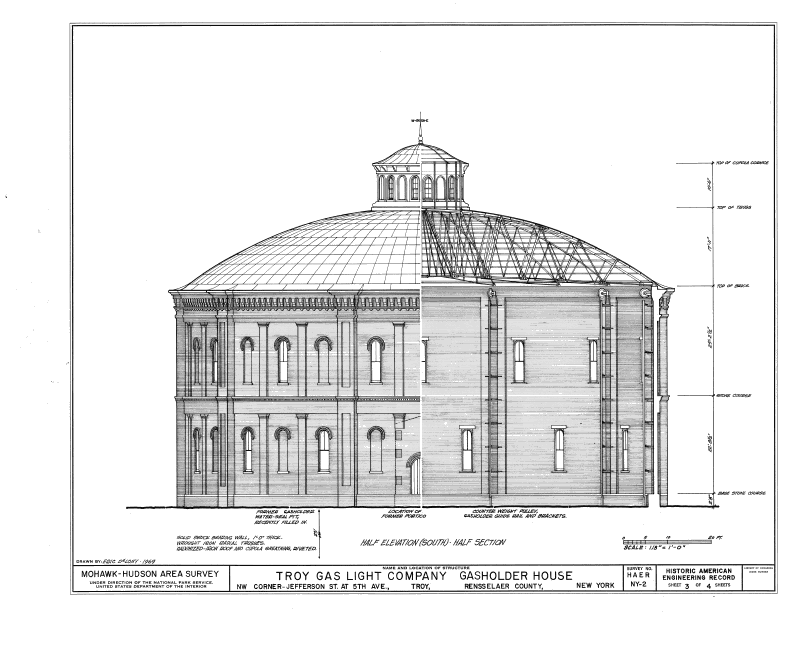
Half Elevation Details, Troy Gas Light Company, Gasholder Building, Historic American Engineering Record

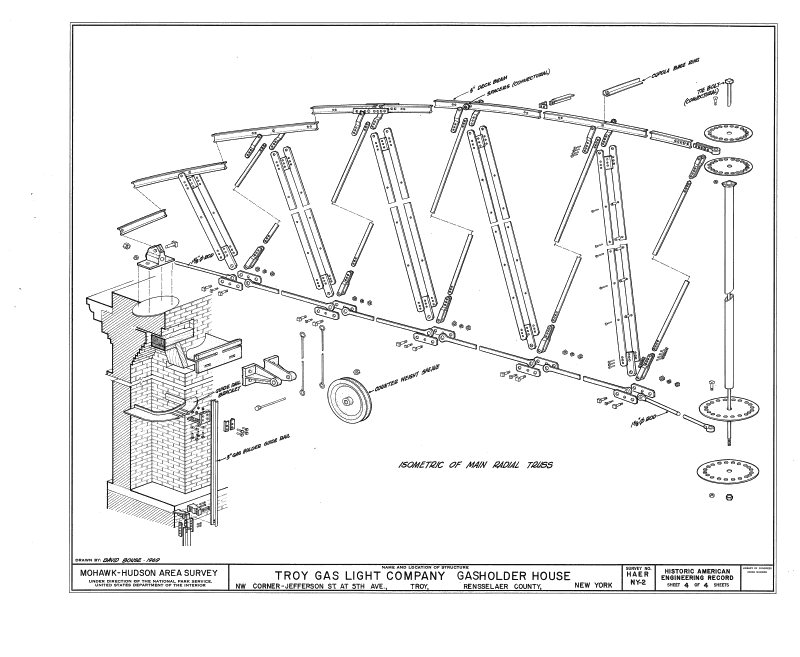
Details of the Truss, Troy Gas Light Company, Gasholder Building, Historic American Engineering Record

== See also ==
- National Register of Historic Places listings in Rensselaer County, New York
- Attleborough Falls Gasholder Building, a similar structure in North Attleborough, Massachusetts
- Concord Gas Light Company Gasholder House, a similar structure in Concord, New Hampshire
- Saratoga Gas, Electric Light and Power Company Complex, a similar structure in Saratoga Springs, New York
- Gas lighting
- History of manufactured gas

== Gallery ==
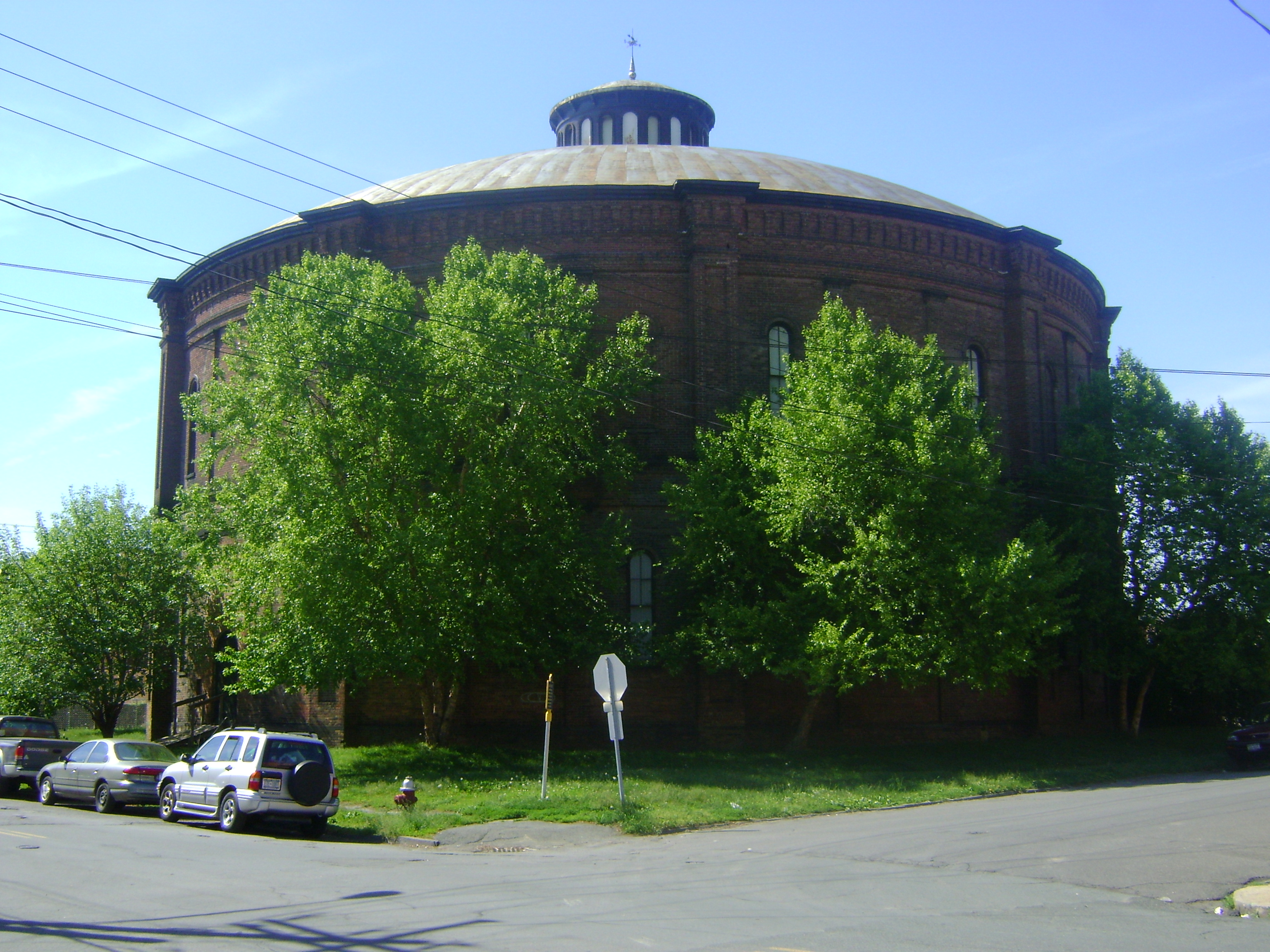
The Gasholder Building in 2010

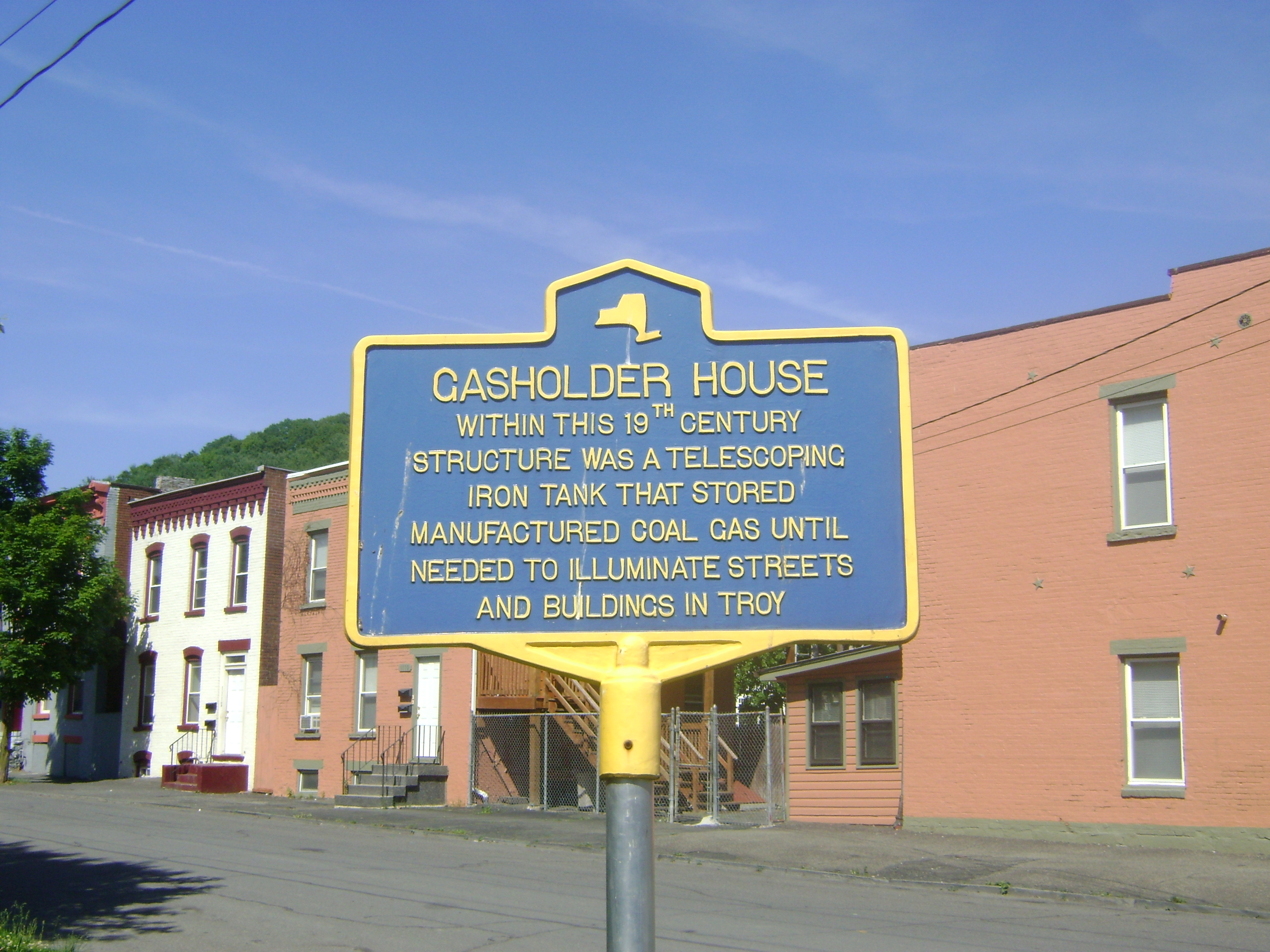
The historical marker in front
