= Concord Gas Light Company Gasholder House =

- U.S. National Register of Historic Places
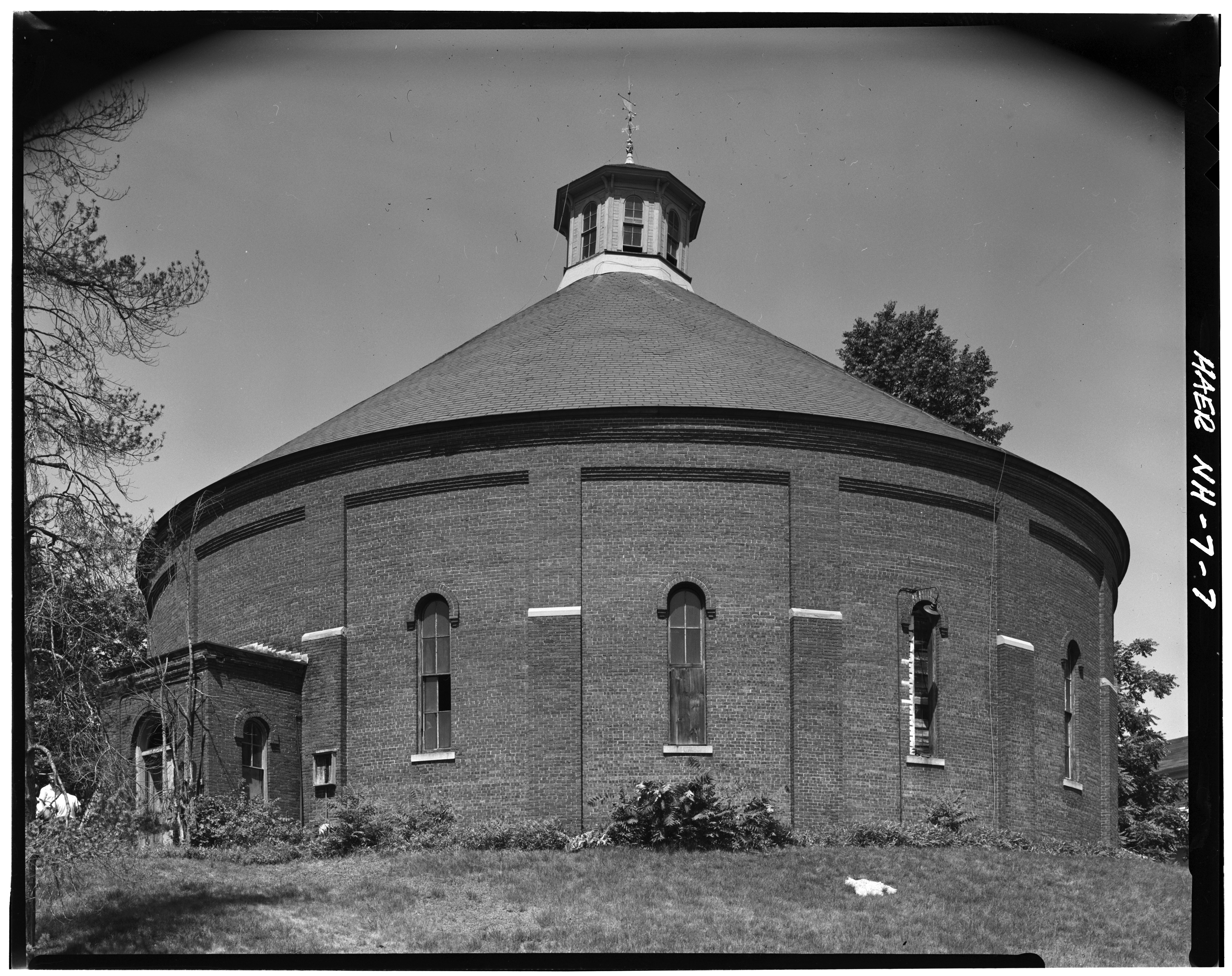
- HAER photo, 1982

- Location within New Hampshire Location within the United States
- Location: Gas Street, Concord, New Hampshire
- Coordinates: 43°11′47″N 71°31′52″W
- Area: 2.7 acres (1.1 ha)
- Built: 1888
- Built by: Concord Gas Light Company
- Architect: Deily & Fowler
- NRHP reference No.: 100001962
- Added to NRHP: January 12, 2018

The Concord Gas Light Company Gasholder House is a historic gasholder house at Gas Street in Concord, New Hampshire. Built in 1888, it is believed to be the only such structure in the United States in which the enclosed gas containment unit is essentially intact. It was listed on the National Register of Historic Places in 2018. Since 2012, it has been owned by Liberty Utilities, a gas, water and electric company. In 2022, Liberty struck a deal with the city of Concord and the New Hampshire Preservation Alliance to begin emergency stabilization work on the building, so that planning for protection and future use can continue.

== Description and history ==
The Concord Gas Light Company Gasholder House is located south of downtown Concord, on the east side of South Main Street just south of its junction with Water Street and north of its junction with Gas Street. It is a circular brick building 86 feet (26 m) in diameter, which is capped by a funnel-shaped roof that has a cupola at the center. The total building height is 80 feet (24 m). Architecturally, the wall is divided into sixteen sections, articulated by simple brick piers, with a tall and narrow round-headed window in most of these sections. A south-facing bay has a projecting hip-roofed valve house, which historically served as the source feed for the storage facility, while a west-facing bay has a projecting gable-roofed valve house which housed the interconnection to the city mains.

Inside the brick structure is a concrete storage tank with a capacity of 125,000 cubic feet (3,500 m^{3}). It has a floor 12 inches (30 cm) thick, with walls that taper from 34 inches (86 cm) at the base to 30 inches (76 cm) at the top. It is reinforced by wrought iron bands. The gasholder (which functions as a sort of lid on the tank) is 80 feet (24 m) in diameter, and is constructed out of metal plates riveted together. It was guided in its movements by rails mounted on the inside of the concrete tank.

The Concord Gas Light Company was founded in 1852, establishing a plant for manufacturing lighting gas from coal on South Main Street. As the company expanded service, it built smaller gasholders, both near its manufacturing sites, and at remote service areas. By the 1880s, it had four such gasholders with a total capacity of 80,000 cubic feet (2,300 m^{3}), which was deemed inadequate for its needs. The present building was constructed in 1888 as a long-term solution to its capacity problem. In 1921 the company built a second gasholder, a more modern steel structure with more capacity, which was demolished in 1989. The company discontinued use of gasholders in 1952, when Concord was connected to natural gas pipeline networks.

According to research performed as part of a Historic American Engineering Record survey of the building, it is believed to be the only gasholder building of its type with an intact interior tank.

== Preservation efforts ==
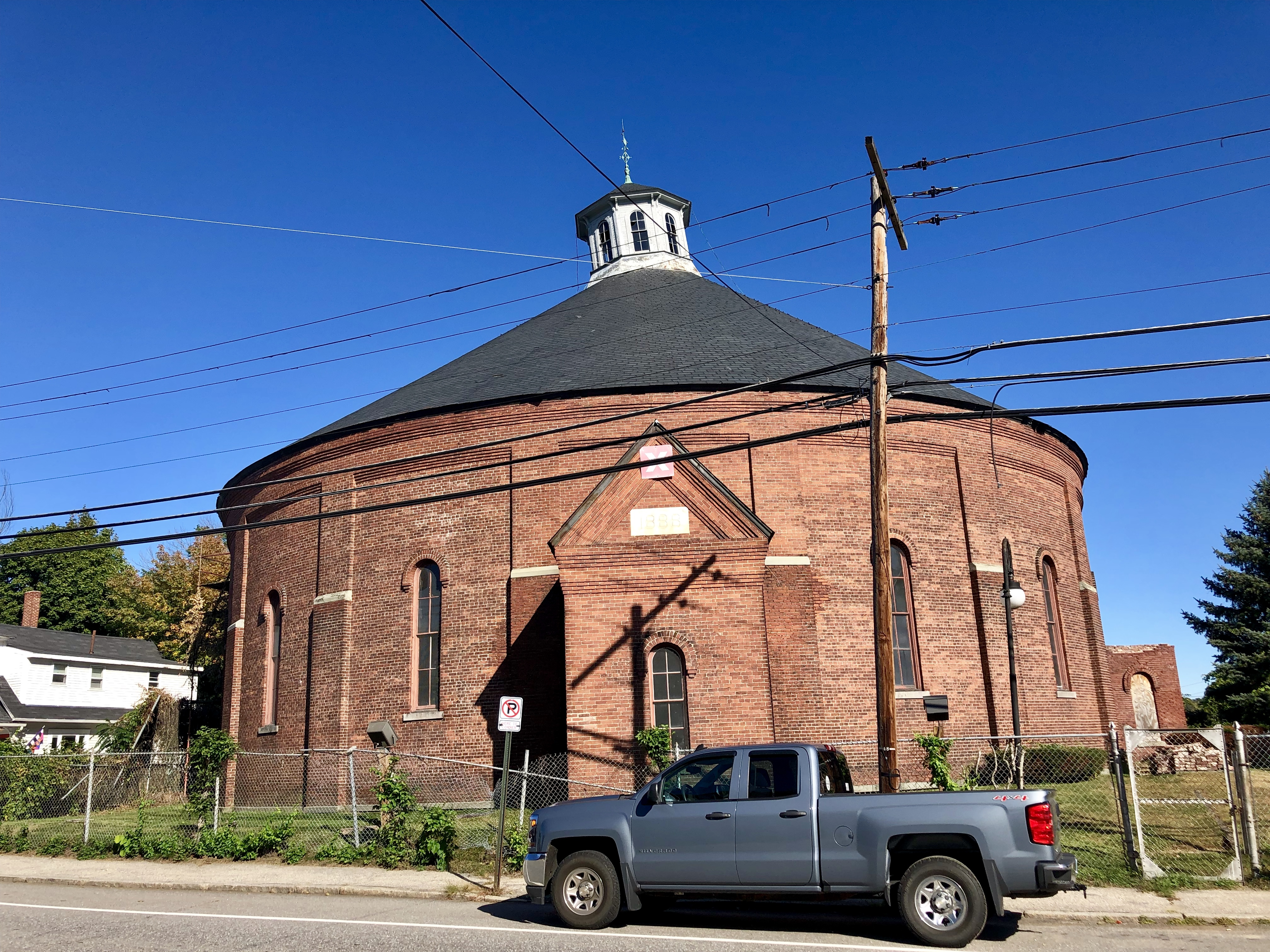
Concord Gasholder House in 2019

The building is the subject of strenuous preservation efforts. Liberty Utilities acquired it in 2012 when they purchased a 2.4-acre (0.97 ha) property from another utility company. In 2016, a section of roof over the entryway collapsed. In late December 2020, Liberty Utilities stated, "The building is in poor condition and has become a safety hazard. Since we are a regulated utility company, and since this building does not serve any purpose for our customers, we cannot justify investing heavily to save it." However, the NH Preservation Alliance fought to stall the company's demolition efforts, listing the building as one of its "Seven to Save" in 2020 because of its architectural and regional significance.

In January 2021, an anonymous donor pledged $500,000 to help save the building from demolition. The donation elevated public interest in the project, and led to a vote by the Concord city council to enter into discussions with Liberty about preservation of the building and future development of the site as a monument and centerpiece of a future south end community. In April 2021, Liberty Utilities agreed to match funds from the anonymous donor and conduct emergency stabilization work. In March 2022, emergency stabilization work on the building began.

== See also ==
- National Register of Historic Places listings in Merrimack County, New Hampshire
- Attleborough Falls Gasholder Building, a similar structure in North Attleborough, Massachusetts
- Saratoga Gas, Electric Light and Power Company Complex, a similar structure in Saratoga Springs, New York
- Troy Gas Light Company, a similar structure in Troy, New York
