= Saratoga Gas, Electric Light and Power Company Complex =

- U.S. National Register of Historic Places
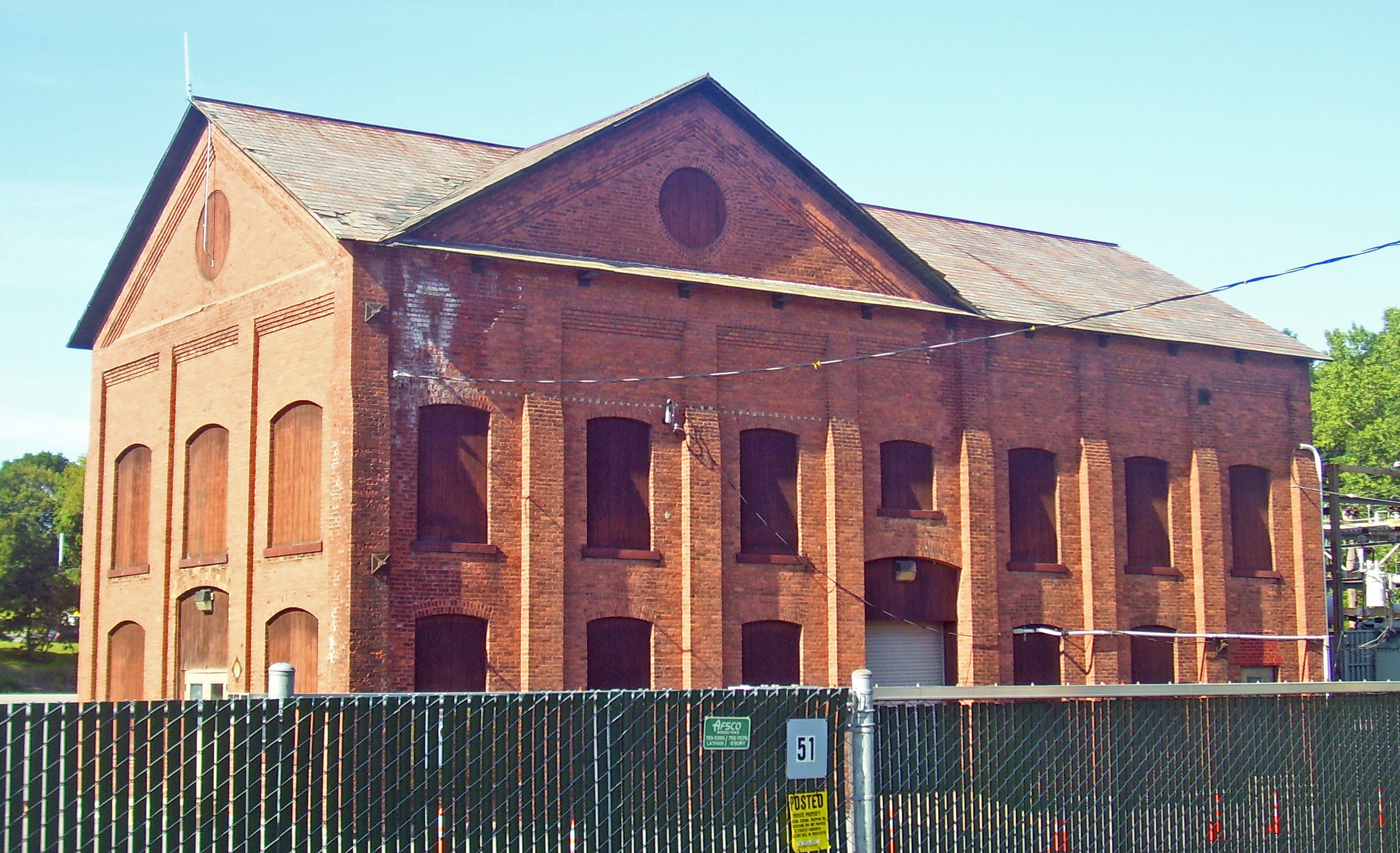
- Substation east elevation and south profile, 2008

- Location within New York Location within the United States
- Location: Saratoga Springs, NY
- Coordinates: 43°5′24″N 73°46′29″W
- Area: 7 acres (2.8 ha)
- Built: 1873-1928
- NRHP reference No.: 00000579
- Added to NRHP: May 1, 2001

The former Saratoga Gas, Electric Light and Power Company Complex is located near the northern boundary of Saratoga Springs, New York, United States. It is a seven-acre (2.8 ha) parcel with two brick buildings on it. In the 1880s it became the thriving resort city's first power station.

They are the only remnants of a gas-fired power plant begun in 1873 and remaining in operation for over half a century. One of the two buildings is a rare conical-roofed gasholder house from that era, one of only 13 left in the Northeast, and archaeological evidence shows evidence of a second one having been built nearby.

The gas production operations were taken offline in 1928, but the property continued to be used by electric utilities for most of the 20th century. In 1992 Niagara Mohawk decided it was surplus and stopped using it. In 2001 it was listed on the National Register of Historic Places.

== Property ==
The power plant site is an irregular trapezoid-shaped parcel between East Avenue on the east, Excelsior Avenue to the south and a divided section of US 9/NY 50 along its north. The land drops slightly from that road, and trees planted along that side screen the site from passing traffic. All around it is a chain link fence.

Within the fence the entire site is surfaced in loose gravel and devoid of trees. The two buildings are located in different sections of the parcel.

The gasholder house is at the northern corner, close to the junction of East Avenue and routes 9 and 50. It is a cylindrical brick building in common bond 70 feet (21 m) in diameter with a conical slate roof. It has no foundation but the 18-inch–thick (46 cm) walls continue to depth of 23 feet (7.0 m) below grade, where they are grounded in a clay stratus. There are also six exterior brick buttresses.

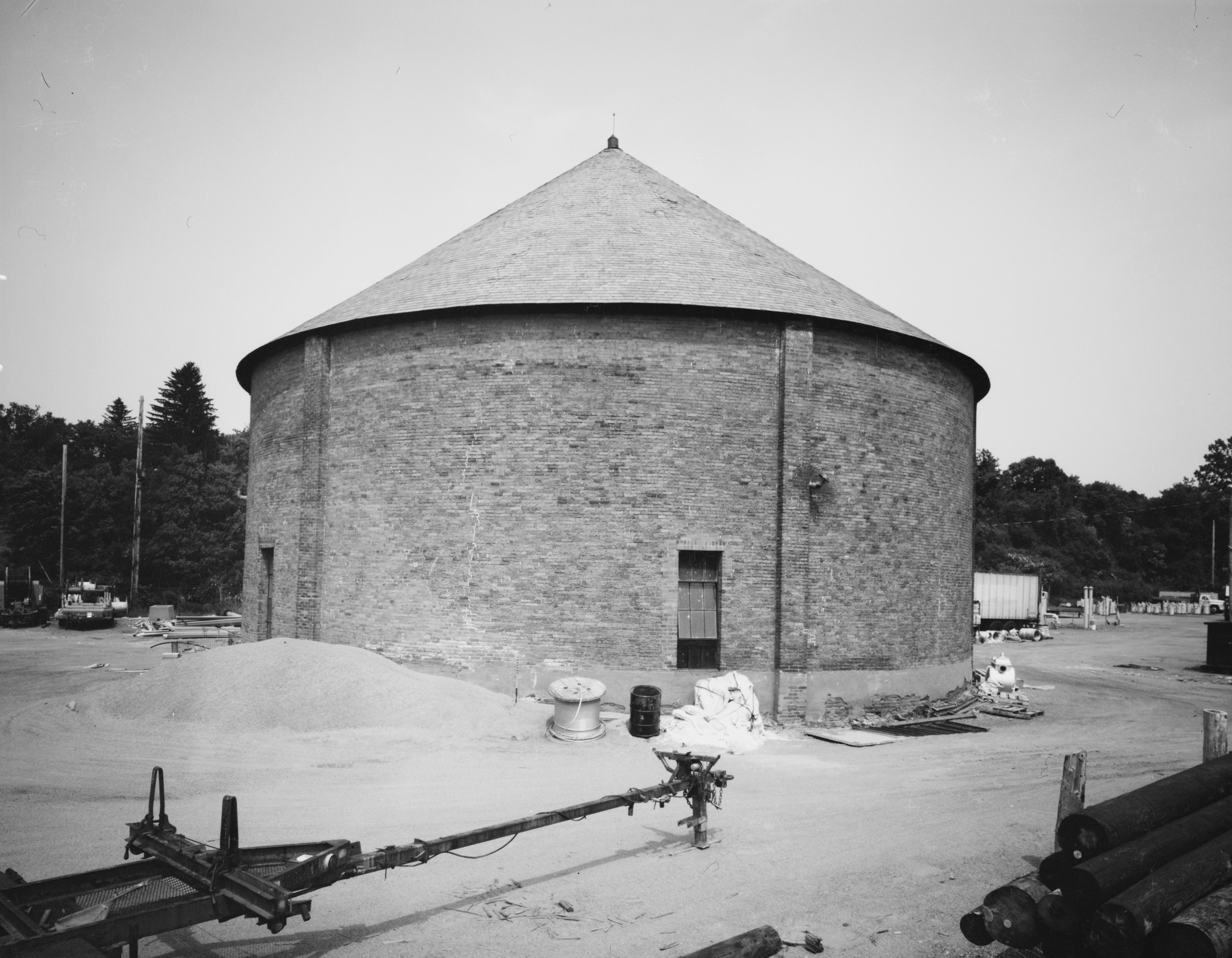
Old gasholder house as photographed for Historic American Engineering Record in 1998

Its roof is supported by radial wood rafters with wood purlins and two transverse bow trusses. The floor is poured concrete. Windows, a vent and service exit were added later.

The substation building is located 200 feet (61 m) to the south, close to that side and north of the only gate in the fence. It is a two-story rectangular brick building, 75 by 35 feet (23 by 11 m), on an east-west axis with a cross-gabled roof. Its foundation is stone laid in a random ashlar pattern. Pilasters divide the walls into recessed panels (7 by 3), and a corbeled cornice marks the roofline. A large oculus is in the tympanum of each gable.

In the middle of the south side is a taller arched entrance with service door and the remains of a hoist. It leads to an interior with an open interior, floored in poured concrete supported by steel beams. Two stone walls run along the inside, the beams resting on them. Brick buttresses shore up the steel I-beams that supported the hoist. V-trusses sheathed in tongue-and-groove pocket into the interior walls, producing the eaves.

The only interior partitition separates the easternmost bay. On that side of the building, outside, are modern transformers and other equipment. Though no longer in use, they are of relatively recent date and are not considered a contributing resource to the Register listing.

As a result of required studies done when the building and site were remediated, considerable archeological evidence has been found of other buildings in the site. The entire site is thus considered a contributing resource.

== History ==
The Saratoga Gas Light Company began providing service to the Village of Saratoga Springs in 1853. As the community grew after the American Civil War, its infrastructure needs did as well. The company needed to build a new gas works, and chose the current location due in part to concerns about locating such a facility near downtown.

The site had other advantages as well. It was close to the railroad line (now routes 9 and 50), had a nearby stream, Village Brook, which could provide sufficient water, and the deep clay layer would provide an impermeable seal below the gas holders. Because of the proximity of the brook, the site was lower than the rest of the city, and therefore it would be easier to distribute the gas as it naturally tends to rise in pipes. The new plant was started in 1873 and opened the next year.

At the original plant it had made gas by coking coal in a horizontal retort and then capturing and storing the gas that was released. The new plant encased a brick retort, purifying house and two gas holders within the cylindrical buildings. The thick walls helped prevent the gas from condensing in the cold winters, and the conical roof accommodated the gasholder, a telescoping series of cylinders that rose within guides as the volume of gas increased. Water in the bottom of the pit made the seal impermeable.

In 1886 the company, which had dropped the "Light" from its name, began using the carbureted water gas process to manufacture gas. This increased its production efficiency and volume, and required the addition of more buildings — a boiler house, oil and coal storage and more gasholders. The following year the company merged with the American Illuminating Company to become the Saratoga Gas, Electric Light and Power Company. A dynamo on the site provided electricity for the city's street lights.

In 1903 the electricity-generation facilities were further expanded. The substation, a steam boiler and 125-foot (38 m) smokestack were added. Power generation continued for eight years, until 1911, when yet another merger created the Hudson River Water Power Company. It built a regional electric power distribution system to carry the power generated by its dams all over the southern Adirondack region. With the cheaper hydroelectric power available, and industrial customers willing to use it in large quantities, it was no longer economical to generate power in Saratoga Springs.

The original gasholder was removed from the first building in 1919. Coal gas production ceased entirely in 1928, and most of the original buildings were demolished in the years afterwards. The substation building remained in use, and the successor utilities also used the area as a storage and maintenance yard until Niagara Mohawk decided it was no longer needed even for those purposes. The utility still owns the land and buildings, and keeps them fenced off.

The property underwent environmental cleanup ordered in 1995. The gasholder was originally slated for demolition but was eventually moved intact to its present location at the northwest corner of the site.

== See also ==
- National Register of Historic Places listings in Saratoga County, New York

Similar gasholder houses

- Attleborough Falls Gasholder Building in Massachusetts
- Concord Gas Light Company Gasholder House in New Hampshire
- Troy Gas Light Company in New York
