= Attleborough Falls Gasholder Building =

- U.S. National Register of Historic Places
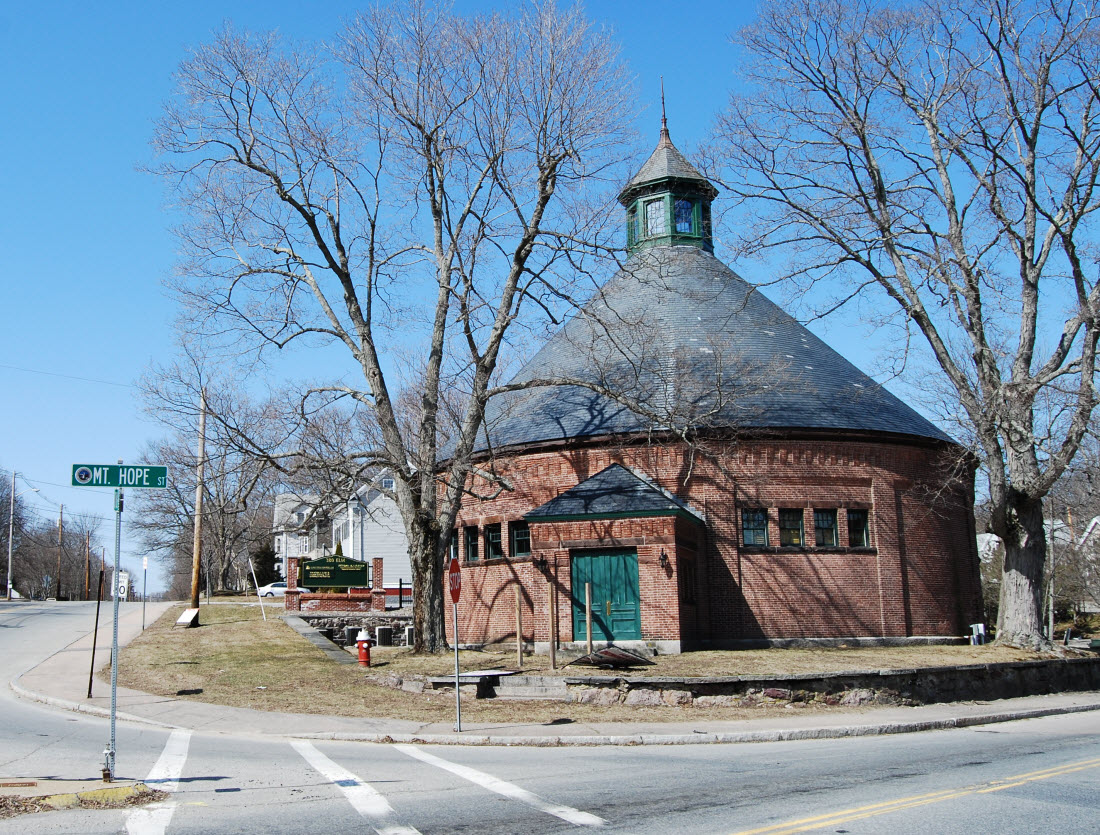

- Location within Massachusetts Location within the United States
- Location: North Attleborough, Massachusetts
- Coordinates: 41°58′28″N 71°19′11″W
- Area: less than one acre
- Built: 1882
- NRHP reference No.: 96000848
- Added to NRHP: August 1, 1996

The Attleborough Falls Gasholder Building is a historic industrial building at 380 Elm Street in North Attleborough, Massachusetts. It is a rare surviving example (of which not more than three were identified in the state in 1987) of a mid-19th century gasholder house. The brick structure originally housed a tank in which coal gas was stored. It was listed on the National Register of Historic Places in 1996.

== Description and history ==
The gasholder building is located at the northwest corner of Elm and Mount Hope Streets, in central eastern North Attleborough. It is a round building about 35 feet (11 m) in diameter and 32 feet (9.8 m) in height, including its conical slate roof and cupola-like top. A hip-roofed entry section projects from the structure facing the intersection. The structure is built out of brick laid in common bond, with finely detailed corbelling and pilasters. The structure originally housed a tank in which gas created by a coal gasification process was stored.

The North Attleborough Gas Company was established in 1855. Its Attleboro Falls plant was expanded in 1874, and this structure was built in 1882 as the third in town to store gas in order to meet increased demand. Adjacent to it was a coal-processing facility at which the fuel was produced. After a series of acquisitions, the assets of the company became part of the Vermont Light Company in 1940. Roy Underhill, a gas company employee, purchased the building in that year, and was responsible for saving it from destruction by developers. It remains in private hands, with preservation restrictions.

== See also ==
- National Register of Historic Places listings in Bristol County, Massachusetts
- Concord Gas Light Company Gasholder House, a similar structure in Concord, New Hampshire
- Saratoga Gas, Electric Light and Power Company Complex, a similar structure in Saratoga Springs, New York
- Troy Gas Light Company, a similar structure in Troy, New York
