= Gasholder house =

Building that encloses a gasholder

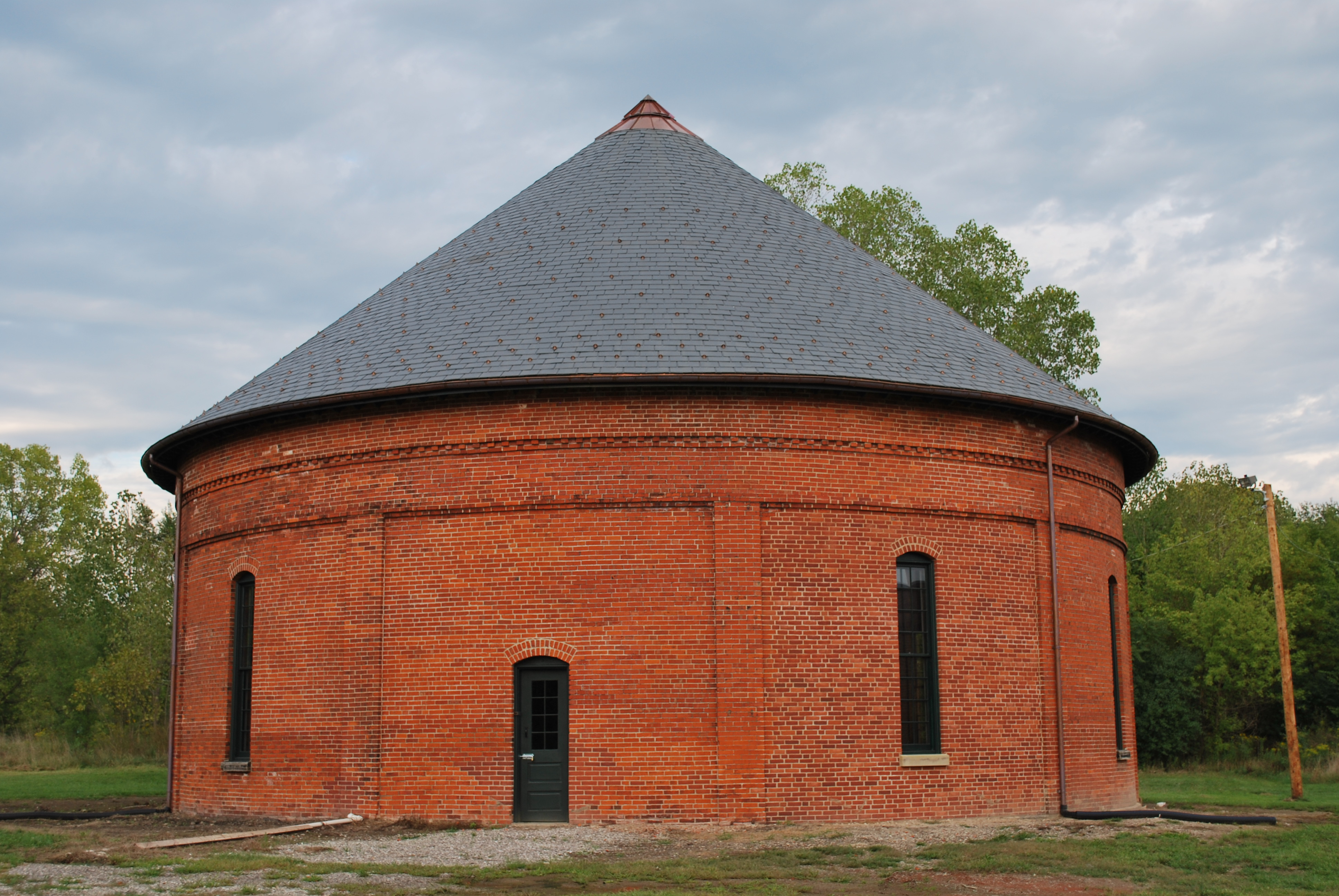
Oberlin Gasholder House in Ohio

A gasholder house is a type of structure that was used to surround an iron gas holder, also known as a gasometer, in which coal gas was stored until it was needed. There are approximately a dozen of these structures—most constructed of brick in the latter-half of the 19th century—that still stand in the United States. Some examples still stand in Europe as well.

== Description ==
Before the 1870s, most iron gasholders were constructed without a building structure, but following practices already common in New England, gasholders houses were adopted in New York. Additionally, gasholder houses were constructed in England as early as 1825, although the mild climate made them less of an advantage.

Gasholder houses were built to protect the iron gas holder from the elements, and enabled it to be built from thinner plates. A gasholder house provided a number of advantages:

- Provides a way to withstand the wind, and the forces on the thinner iron gasholder.
- Avoids snow loads on the top of the holder, and icing of the guides that controlled the vertical movement of the gasholder.
- Prevented the freezing of water in the pit around the gasholder that provides the seal to the gasholder, thus preventing the loss of gas.
- There is also some belief that a gasholder house allayed fears about explosion from the stored gas.

The gasholder house also provides economic advantage by reducing the condensation of gas in cold weather, and provided an attractive architectural element of the gas complex.

There are approximately a dozen known gasholder houses still standing in the United States, with the Troy Gas Light Company structure in Troy, New York, being one of the largest remaining structures of this type.

== Extant gasholder houses ==
=== United States ===
Name	Location	Built	Current usage
Atlantic Mills	Providence, Rhode Island	unknown	office
Attleborough Falls Gasholder Building†	North Attleborough, Massachusetts	1882	privately owned
Baltic Mill Gasholder House	Sprague, Connecticut	c. 1874	vacant
Batavia Gasholder House	Batavia, New York	c. 1855	utility company storage
Concord Gas Light Company Gasholder House†	South Main Street; Concord, New Hampshire	1888	vacant
Concord Gas Light Company Gasholder House	Library Road; Concord, New Hampshire	1880	prep school post office
Gasholder House at Lockwood Mill	Waterville, Maine	unknown	office / commercial space
Northampton Gasholder House	Northampton, Massachusetts	1856	office / commercial space
Oberlin Gas Lighting Company Gasholder House	Oberlin, Ohio	1889	Oberlin Underground Railroad Center
Roxbury/South Boston Gasholder Building	Boston, Massachusetts	1868–1873	hotel
Saratoga Gas, Electric Light and Power Company Complex†	Saratoga Springs, New York	unknown	utility company storage
Troy Gas Light Company†	Troy, New York	1873	office / light industrial storage
Woonsocket Gasholder House	Woonsocket, Rhode Island	c. 1865	office

† Listed on the National Register of Historic Places

=== Elsewhere ===
- Gasometer, Dresden, in Germany
- Østre Gasværk Teater, now houses a theatre, in Copenhagen, Denmark
- St. Petersburg Gas Plant, at the Obvodny Canal in Saint Petersburg, Russia
- Vienna Gasometers, now residential and commercial use, in Austria

== Gallery ==
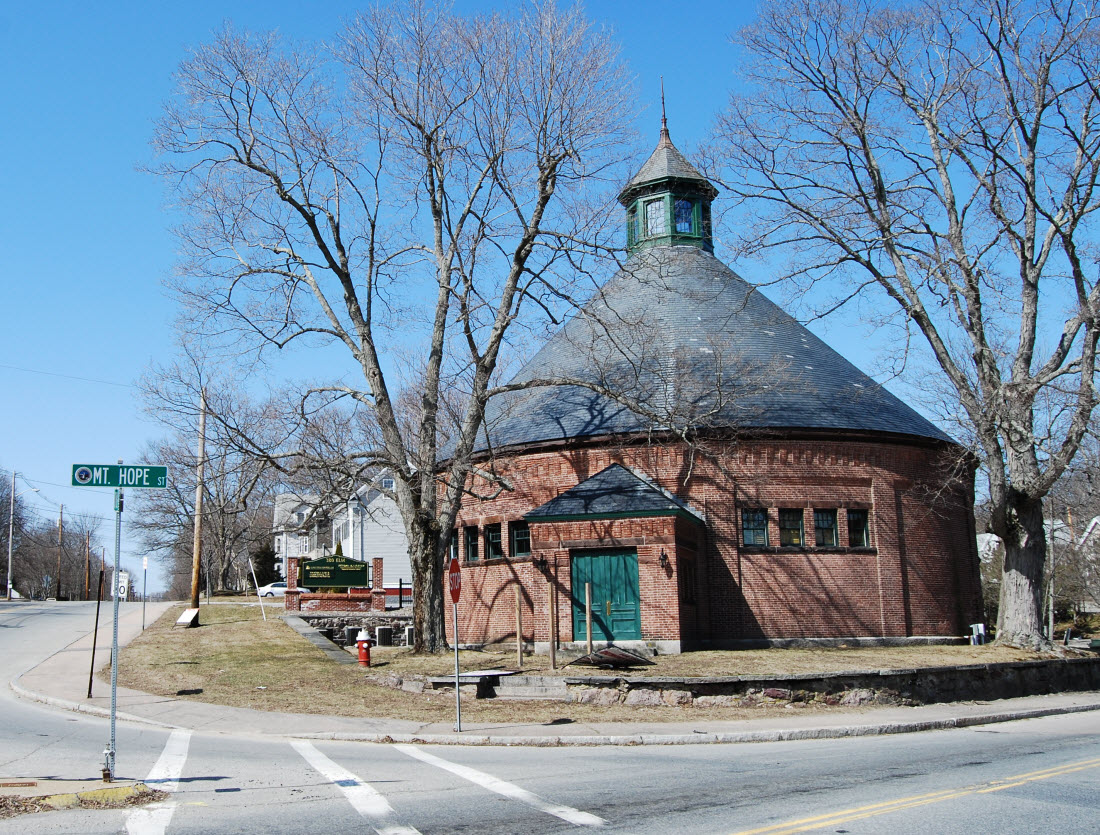
Attleborough Falls Gasholder Building in Massachusetts

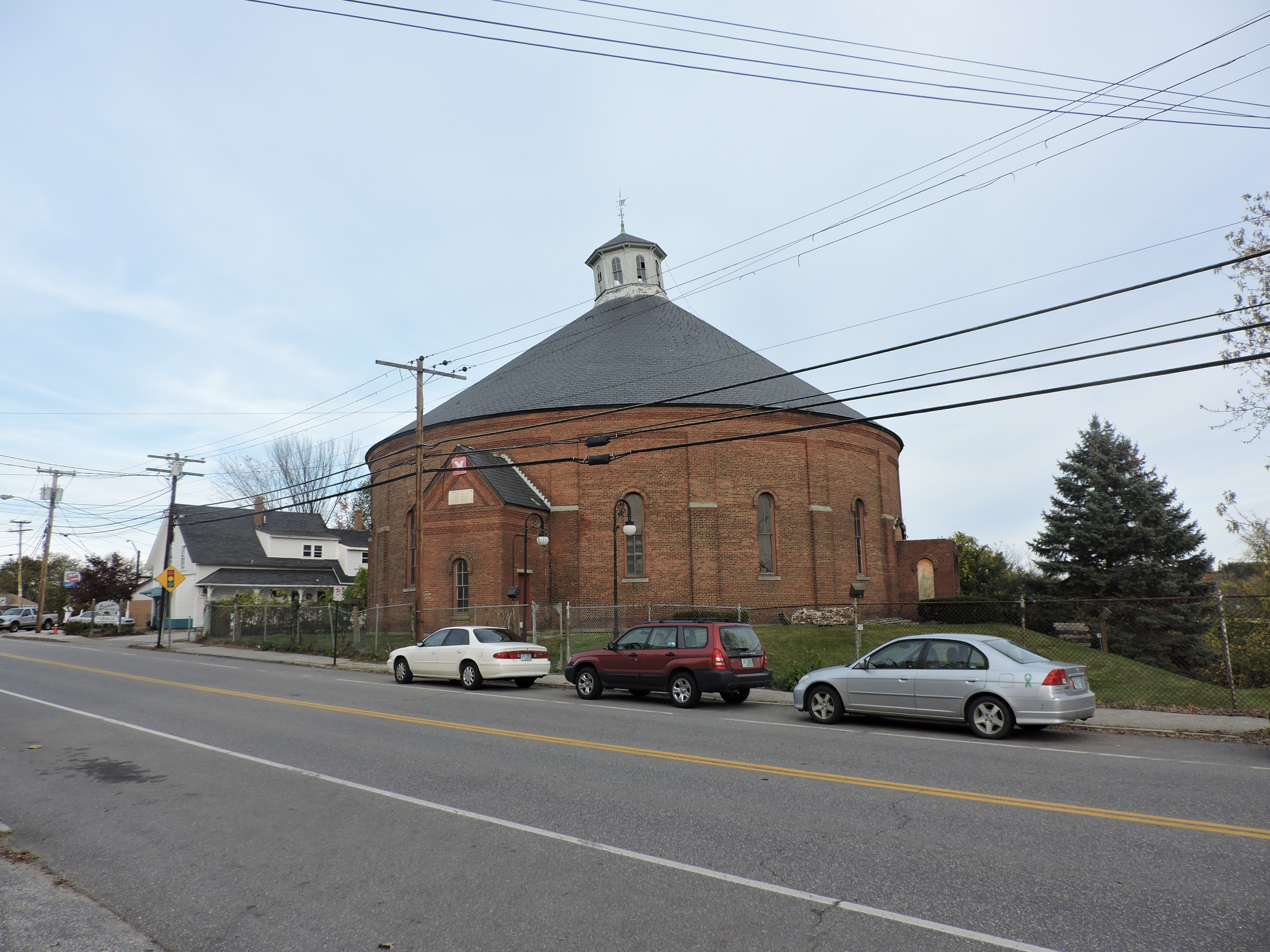
Concord Gas Light Company Gasholder House in New Hampshire

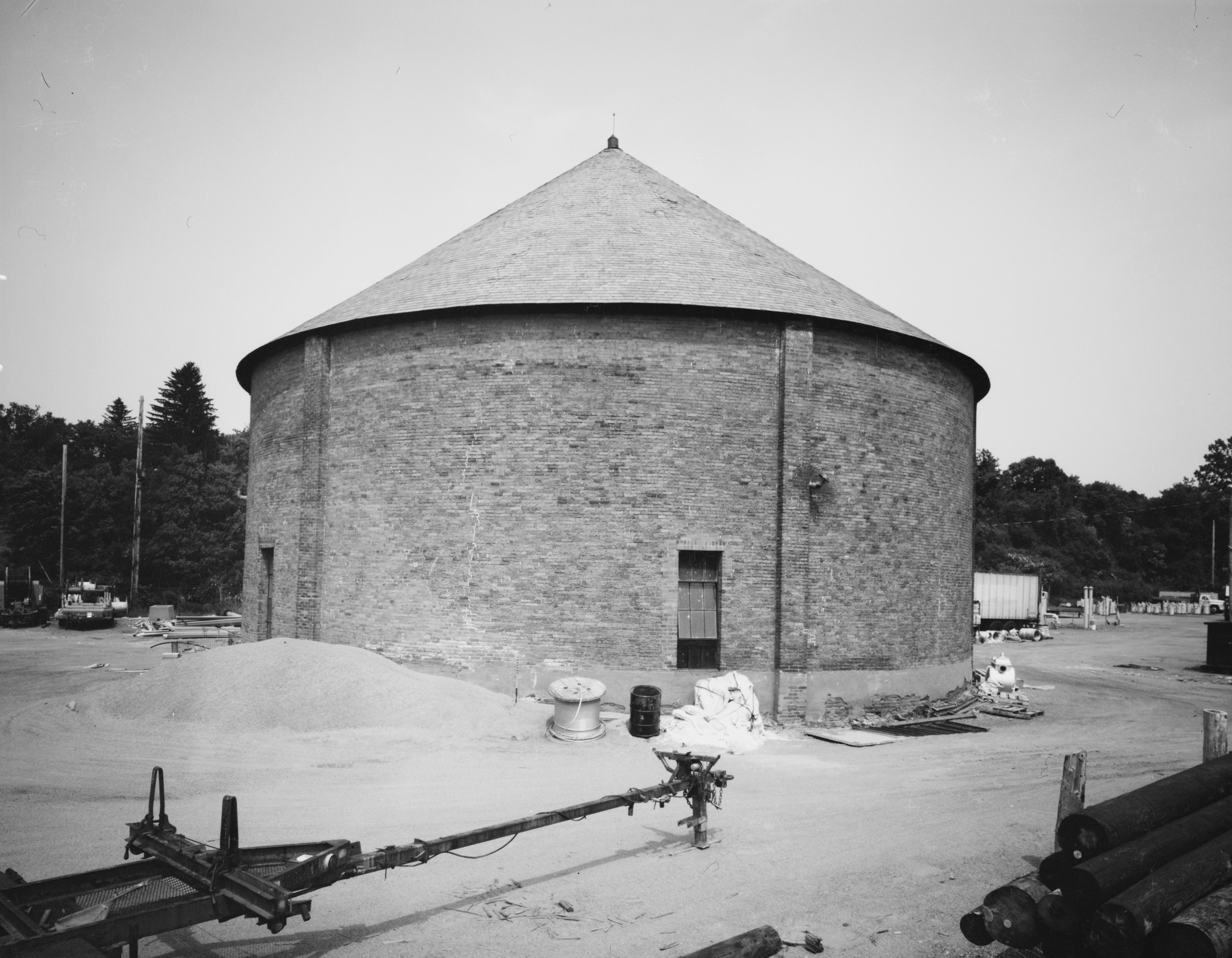
Saratoga Gas, Electric Light and Power Company Complex in New York

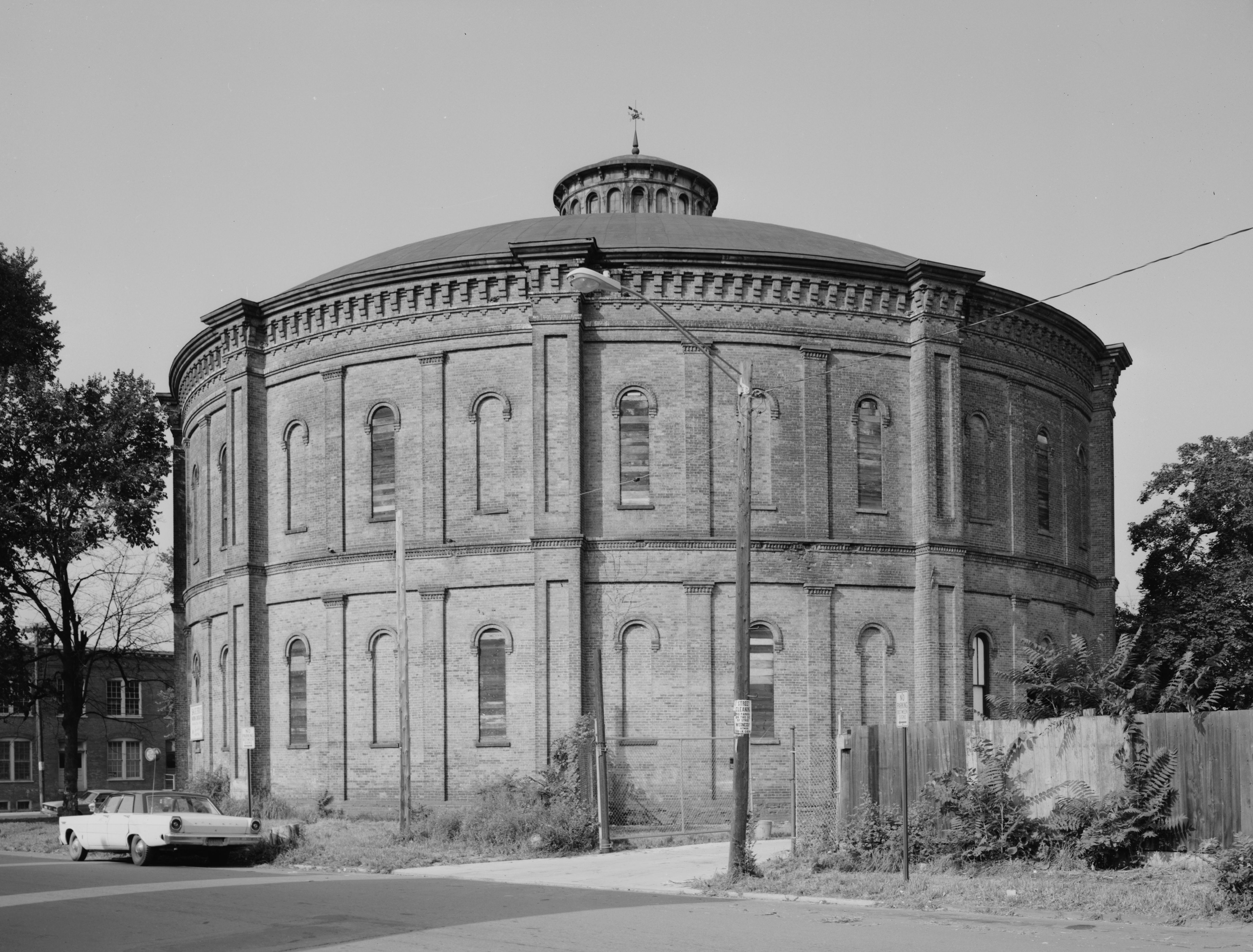
Troy Gas Light Company in New York
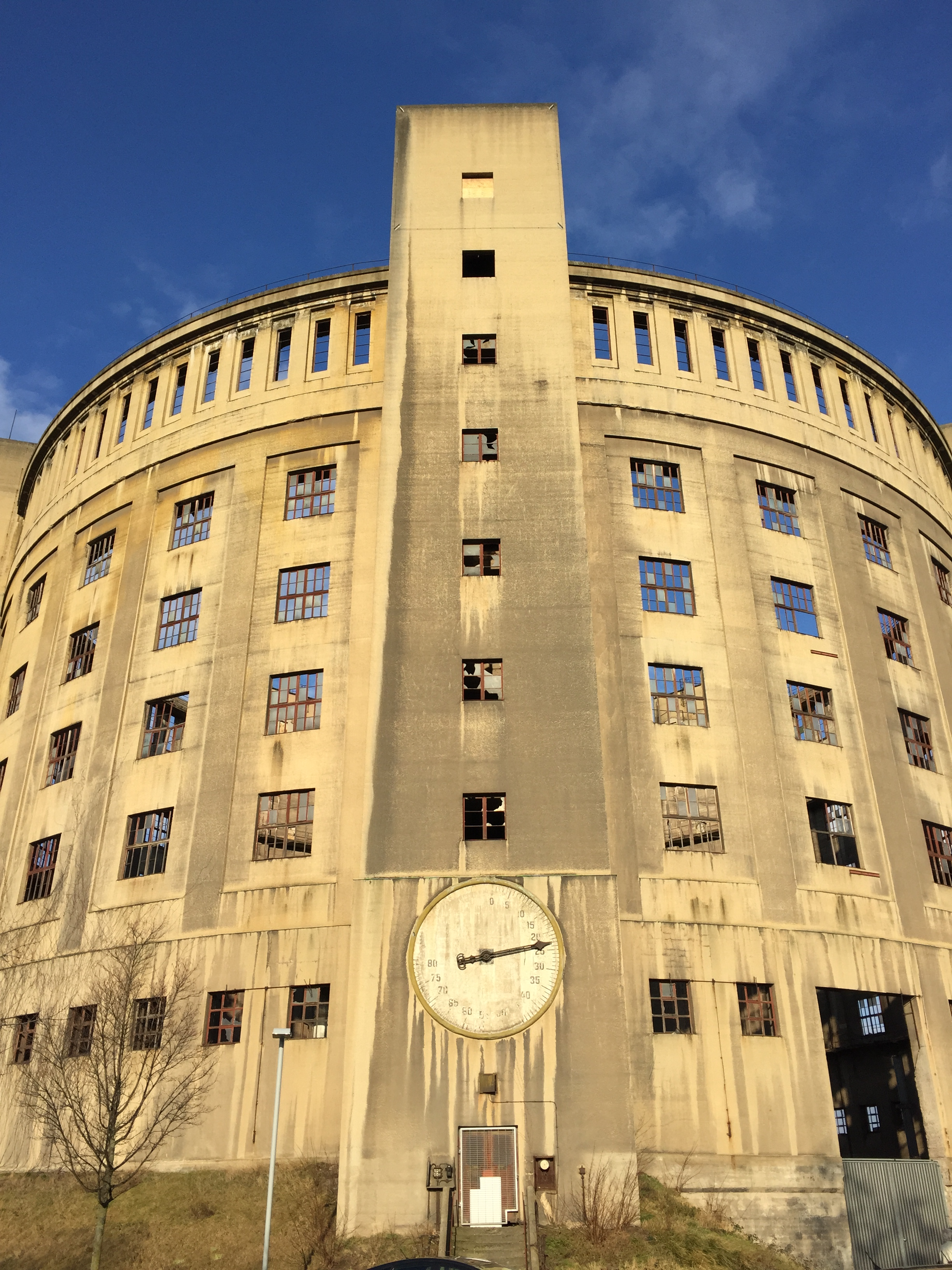
Gasometer, Dresden, Germany

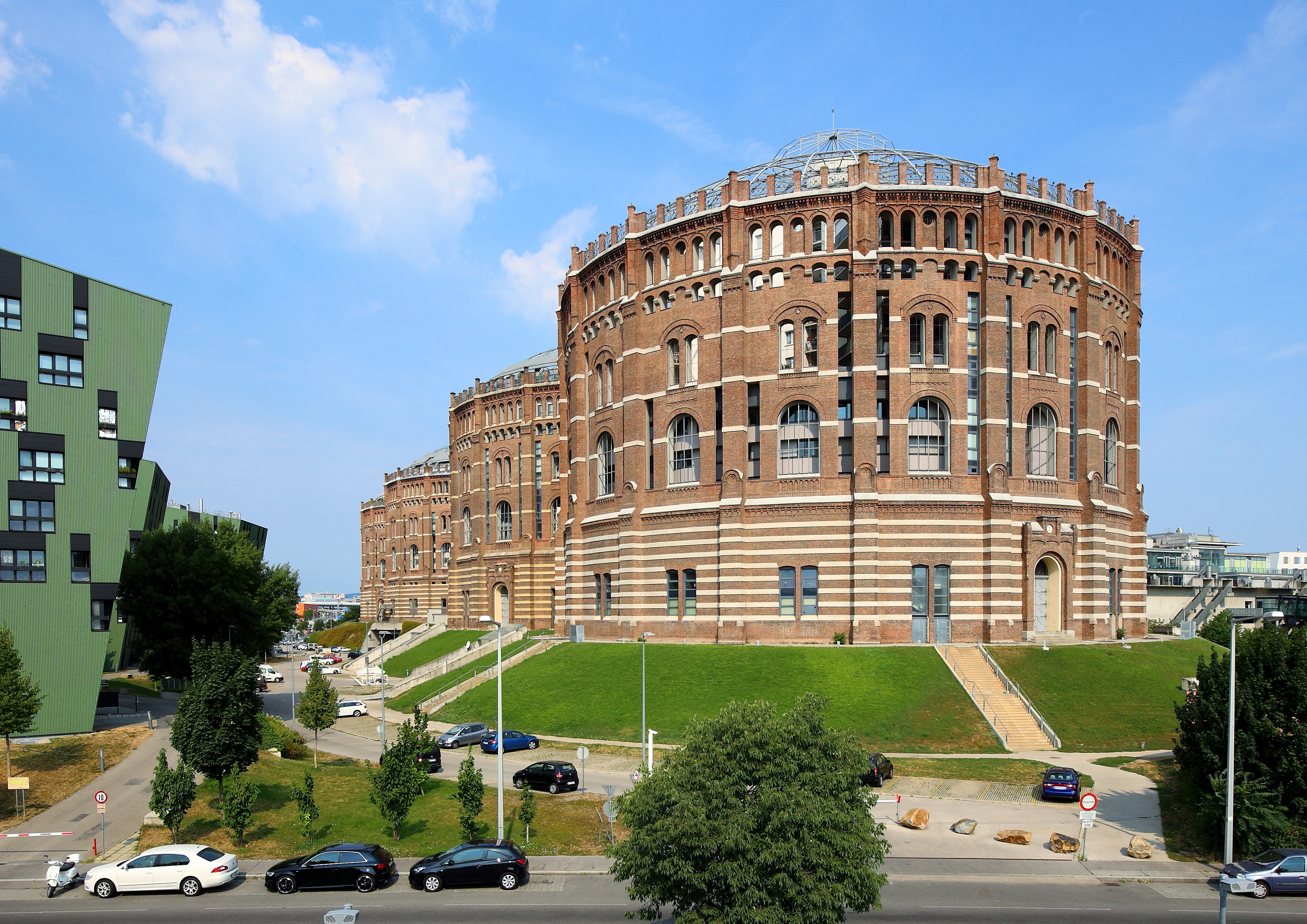
Gasometer, Vienna, Austria

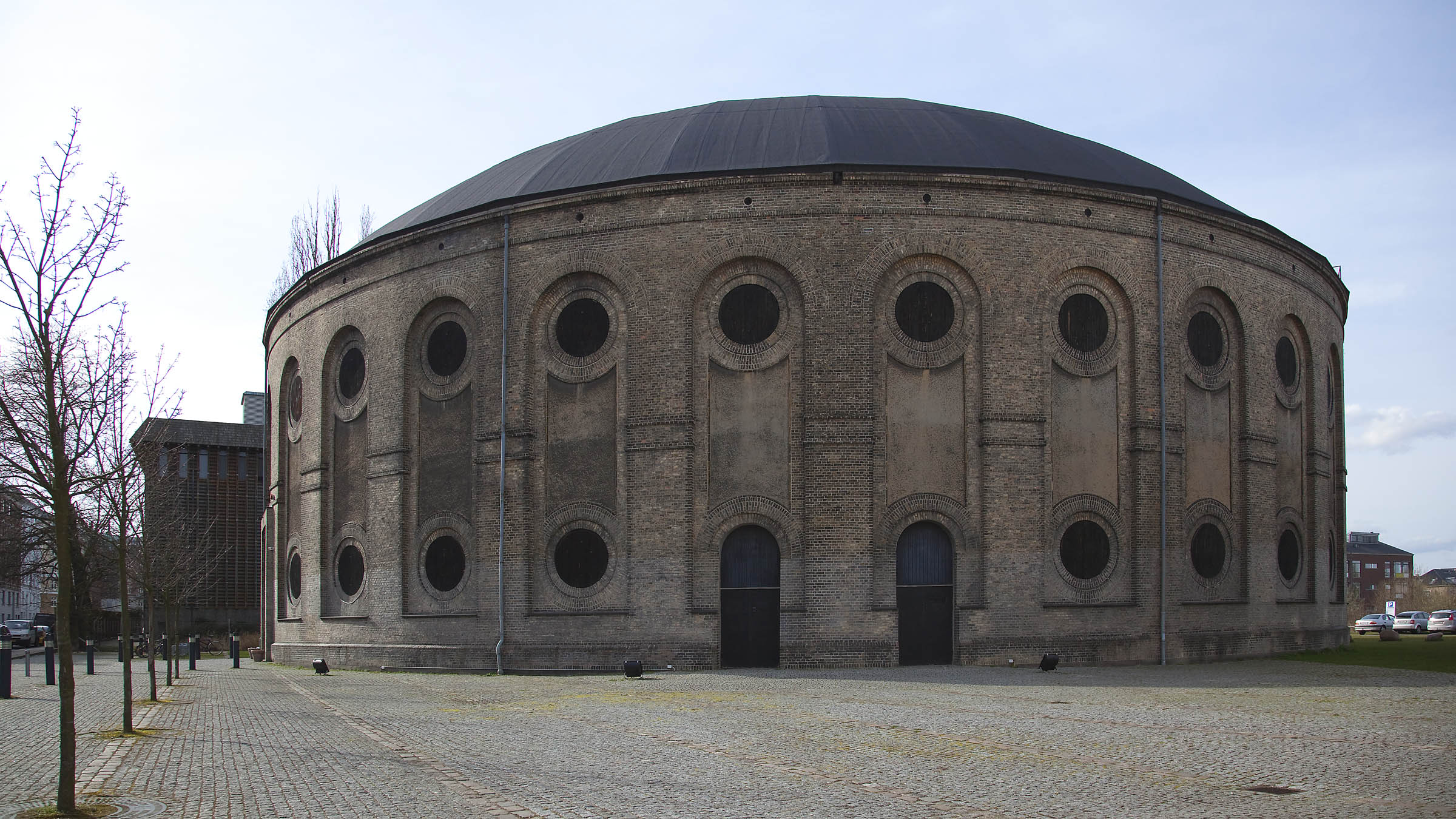
Østre Gasværk Teater, Copenhagen, Denmark

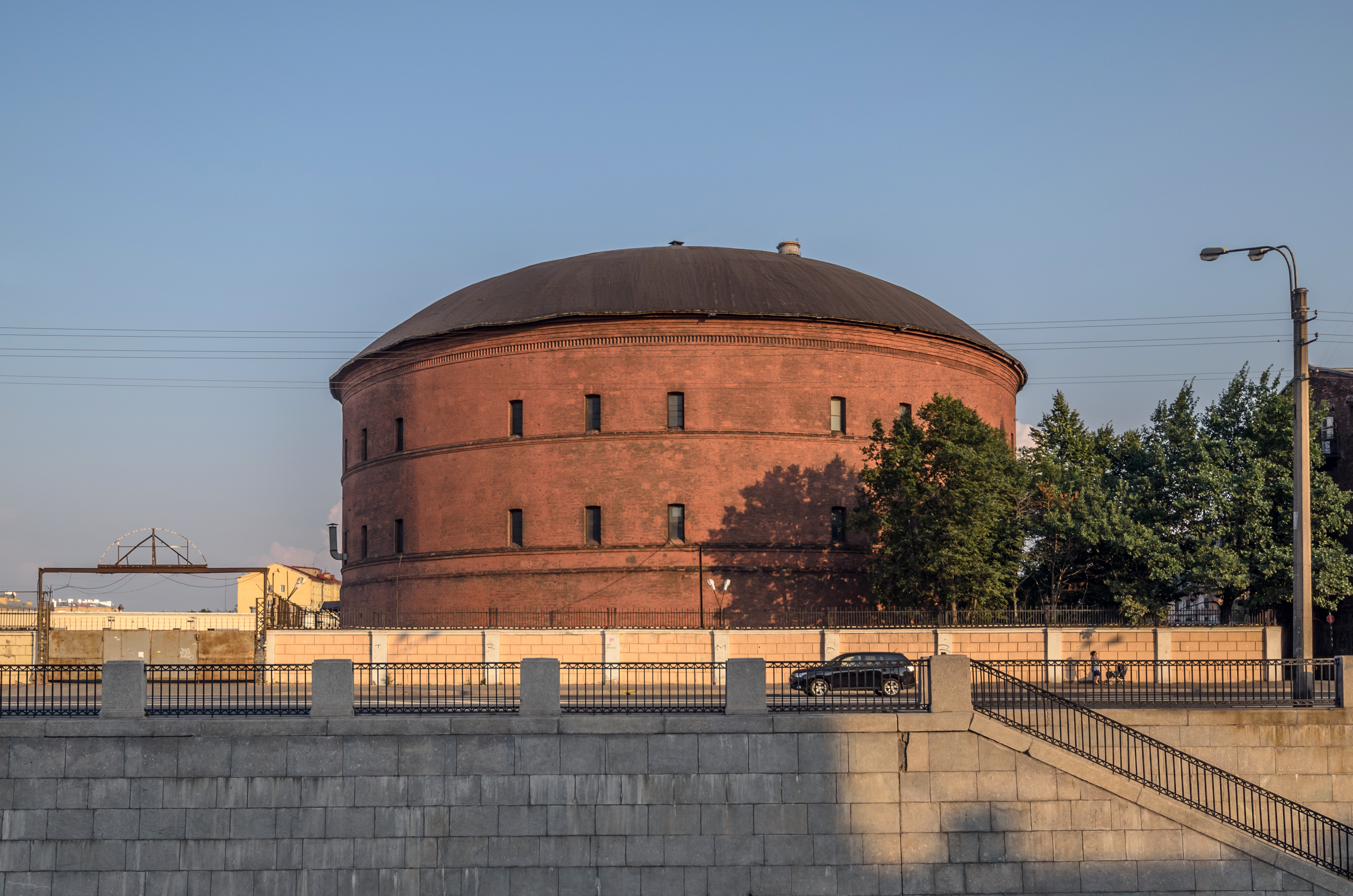
St. Petersburg Gas Plant, Russia
