= New York State Route 378 =

Highway in New York

New York State Route 378
- Map of Capital District in eastern New York with NY 378 highlighted in red

Route information
- Maintained by NYSDOT
- Length: 3.34 mi (5.38 km)
- Existed: mid-1930s–present

Major junctions
- West end: US 9 in Colonie
- I-787 in Menands
- East end: US 4 in Troy

Location
- Country: United States
- State: New York
- Counties: Albany, Rensselaer

Highway system
- New York Highways; Interstate; US; State; Reference; Parkways
← NY 377	→ NY 379

New York State Route 378 (NY 378) is a state highway in the Capital District of New York in the United States. It runs from Loudonville to Troy and traverses the Hudson River via the Menands Bridge. NY 378 once connected to Menands Road in the village of Menands; however, Menands Road has since been split in two by a now-closed exit ramp. NY 378 connects the western part of Menands Road with Troy. It also connects with NY 377 at Van Rensselaer Boulevard. NY 378 continues west of U.S. Route 9 (US 9) as Osborne Road (County Route 154). At its eastern terminus, NY 378 continues north as US 4. US 4 southbound is accessed by an eastward turn at the terminus.

== Route description ==
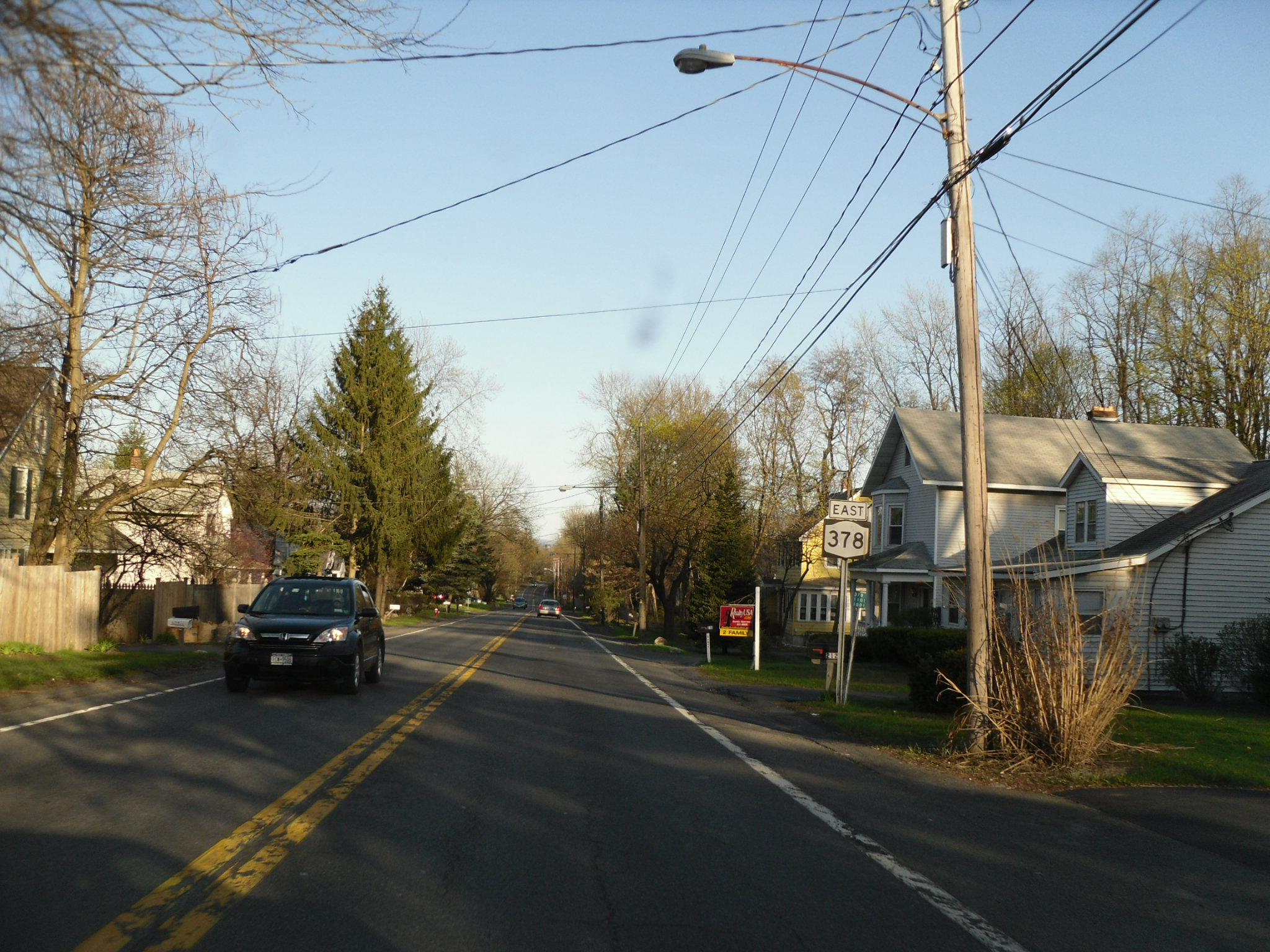
NY 378 eastbound through Colonie

NY 378 begins at an intersection with US 9 (Loudon Road) in the Loudonville section of Colonie as a continuation of County Route 154 (Osborne Road). NY 378 progresses southeast as Menand Road, a two-lane residential street through Colonie. The road expands to four lanes before intersecting with the northern terminus of NY 377 (Van Rennselaer Boulevard). After this intersection, NY 378 becomes a four-lane divided freeway, crossing eastbound through Colonie and into Menands. The route turns to the northeast, passing to the north of Ganser-Smith Memorial Park, crosses over a railroad line via a bridge, before entering into an interchange with NY 32 (Broadway). NY 378 becomes further divided into six lanes for a short distance after NY 32, entering interchange 7E and 7W of Interstate 787. NY 378 becomes a four-lane undivided freeway before crossing the Hudson River on the Menands Bridge, entering the city of Troy. Crossing over another railroad line on the other shore, NY 378 becomes a four-lane surface road known as High Street before curving northbound and terminating at an intersection with US 4 (Mill Street / Burden Avenue) in Troy.

== History ==
NY 378 was assigned in the mid-1930s to Menands Road, a short connector road between US 9 in Loudonville and NY 32 in Menands. The Troy–Menands Bridge linking Menands to Troy was initially unnumbered. In the early 1940s, NY 2 was extended south from Troy to downtown Albany by way of the bridge. NY 378 was realigned east of NY 377 in the early 1950s to follow a new highway connecting directly to the Troy–Menands Bridge. On January 1, 1970, NY 2 was truncated to Troy on its western end. Its former routing across the Hudson River to US 4 in southern Troy became an extension of NY 378.

== Major intersections ==
County	Location	mi	km	Destinations	Notes
Albany	Town of Colonie	0.00	0.00	US 9 (Loudon Road)	Western terminus; hamlet of Loudonville
Albany	Menands	0.93	1.50	NY 377 south (Van Rensselaer Boulevard)	Northern terminus of NY 377; south entrance to Albany Rural Cemetery
Albany	Menands			Western end of freeway section	
Albany	Menands	1.94	3.12	NY 32 (Broadway) – Menands, Watervliet	Parclo interchange
Albany	Menands	2.53	4.07	I-787 – Albany, Cohoes	Exits 7E-W on I-787
Rensselaer	Troy			Eastern end of freeway section	
Rensselaer	Troy	3.34	5.38	US 4 (Mill Street / Burden Avenue)	Eastern terminus
1.000 mi = 1.609 km; 1.000 km = 0.621 mi
