= Al-Tro Island Park =

Amusement park in New York, United States

- Previously known as Pleasure Island, Lagoon Island, Dreamland
- Interactive map of Al-Tro Island Park
- Location: Menands, New York, United States
- Coordinates: 42°40′46″N 73°43′38″W
- Status: Defunct
- Opened: Late 19th century
- Closed: Early 1920s
- General manager: Manager Rosen

Al-Tro Island Park was an amusement park built in the late 19th century in the village of Menands near the border with Albany, New York; formerly the park was known as Pleasure Island. The island has since been covered with fill and used for Interstate 787.

== History ==
In the 1880s, thousands of visitors jammed Pleasure Island, also known as "Dreamland." In truth, it was not an actual island, but was separated from the mainland by the Erie Canal.

By Memorial Day, 1907, Pleasure Island was built up and re-opened as Al-Tro Island Park, named for the two cities it was located between, Albany and Troy. It featured 40-piece orchestra in a dance hall, a roller-skating rink, a roller coaster, a theater with 4,000 seats, its own miniature railroad, a pony track and more than a hundred other attractions. The park even had its own police force consisting of 15 uniformed officers to maintain safety and order. A boardwalk extended the entire length of the island.

By the early 1920s, Al-Tro Island Park began to fall out of favor due to changing tastes in leisure. No one knows exactly when it closed or what happened to it. Most agree that the park "vanished without a trace." The Mid-City Amusement Park was constructed as a replacement nearby on Broadway, also in Menands, but it too has since been destroyed.
