= Lake Worth Corridor, Florida =

- unincorporated place
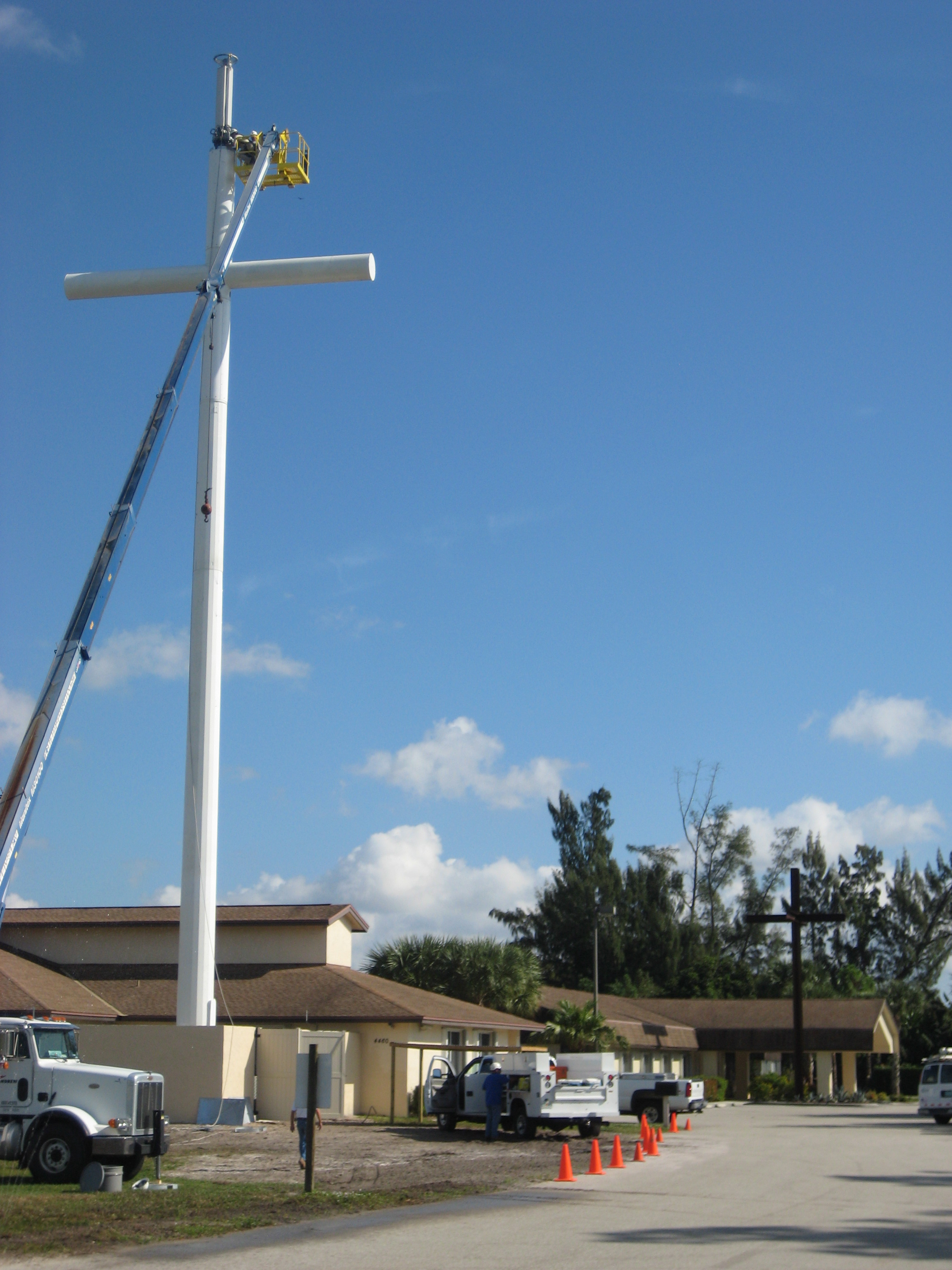
- Epiphany Lutheran Church, in the Lake Worth Corridor, erecting its cross.
- Interactive map of Lake Worth Corridor, Florida
- Coordinates: 26°37′12″N 80°6′1″W
- Country: United States
- State: Florida
- County: Palm Beach

Area
  - Total: 3.4 sq mi (8.9 km^{2})
  - Land: 3.4 sq mi (8.9 km^{2})
  - Water: 0 sq mi (0.0 km^{2})
- Elevation: 13 ft (4 m)

Population (2000)
  - Total: 18,663
  - Density: 5,453/sq mi (2,105.3/km^{2})
- Time zone: UTC-5 (Eastern (EST))
  - Summer (DST): UTC-4 (EDT)
- Zip code: 33461
- Area codes: 561, 728
- FIPS code: 12-39087
- GNIS feature ID: 1853265

Lake Worth Corridor was a former census-designated place (CDP) and now a current unincorporated place in Palm Beach County, Florida, United States, approximately 3 miles (4.8 km) west of the city of Lake Worth Beach. The population was 18,663 at the 2000 census. The CDP was not included in the 2010 census.

== Geography ==
Lake Worth Corridor is located at 26°37′12″N 80°6′1″W (26.619895, -80.100391).

According to the United States Census Bureau, the CDP has a total area of 8.9 km^{2} (3.4 sq mi), all land.

It is located along Lake Worth Road (hence the name) between Greenacres and Lake Worth Beach, with the village of Palm Springs located just north of the area.

== Demographics ==
As of the census of 2000, there were 18,663 people, 5,921 households, and 4,109 families residing in the CDP. The population density was 2,107.0 people /km^{2} (5,457 people/mi^{2}). There were 6,442 housing units at an average density of 727.3 units /km^{2} (1,884 units/mi^{2}). The racial makeup of the CDP was 63.30% White (42% Non-Hispanic White), 13.62% African American, 0.56% Native American, 1.18% Asian, 0.08% Pacific Islander, 15.95% from other races, and 5.32% from two or more races. Hispanic or Latino of any race were 40.79% of the population.

In 2000, there were 5,921 households, out of which 41.6% had children under the age of 18 living with them, 40.9% were married couples living together, 18.9% had a female householder with no husband present, and 30.6% were non-families. 19.3% of all households were made up of individuals, and 3.7% had someone living alone who was 65 years of age or older. The average household size was 3.06 and the average family size was 3.43.

In 2000, in the former CDP, the population was spread out, with 30.1% under the age of 18, 14.4% from 18 to 24, 35.4% from 25 to 44, 14.9% from 45 to 64, and 5.3% who were 65 years of age or older. The median age was 28 years. For every 100 females, there were 116.1 males. For every 100 females age 18 and over, there were 118.9 males.

In 2000, the median income for a household in the CDP was $32,266, and the median income for a family was $30,604. Males had a median income of $23,281 versus $21,022 for females. The per capita income for the CDP was $12,825. About 16.9% of families and 20.0% of the population were below the poverty line, including 28.7% of those under age 18 and 16.3% of those age 65 or over.

As of 2000, English was the first language for 56.72% of all residents, while Spanish accounted for 38.22%, French Creole accounted for 3.50%, French made up 0.43%, Portuguese totaled 0.34%, Finnish was at 0.27%, and both German and Italian were the mother tongues for 0.24% of the population.

== Transportation ==
Important Roads

- Lake Worth Road
- Military Trail
- Congress Avenue

== See also ==
- City of Lake Worth Beach
