= Menands Bridge =

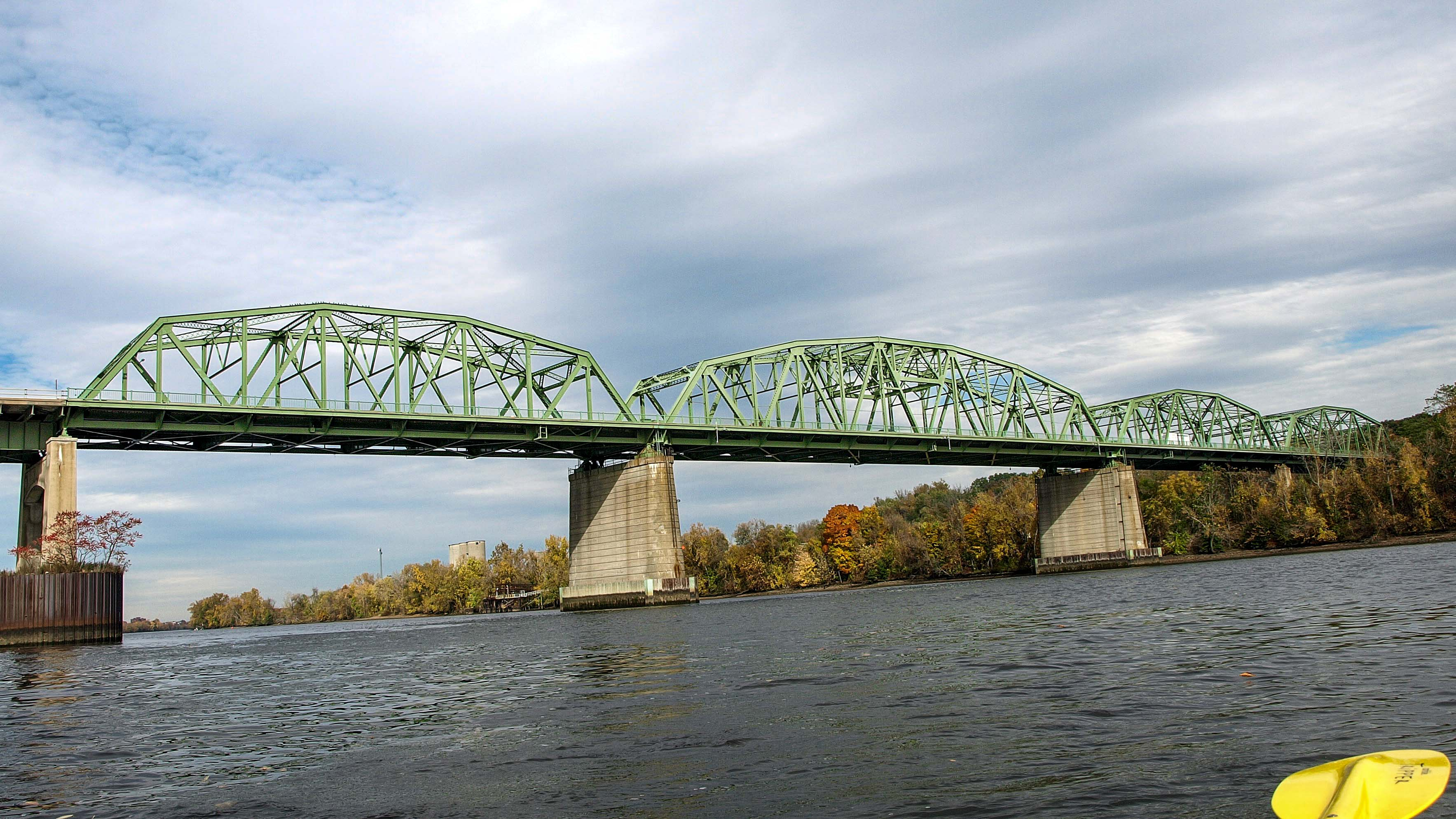
- In 2009
- Coordinates: 42.701005°N 73.703086°W
- Carries: NY 378
- Crosses: Hudson River
- Locale: Menands, New York and Troy, New York
- Official name: Troy-Menands Bridge
- Maintained by: New York State Department of Transportation
- ID number: 1062850

Characteristics
- Design: Through truss
- Clearance above: Vertical 66 feet (20 m), horizontal 317 feet (97 m)

History
- Opened: 1933

Location
- Interactive map of Menands Bridge

The Menands Bridge, officially known as the Troy-Menands Bridge, is a four-span through truss bridge that carries New York State Route 378 across the Hudson River in New York connecting Menands with Troy. Built in 1933, the crossing is supported by concrete piers and - even though it was designed and constructed at the end of the first third of the 20th century - was originally fitted with a lift section to accommodate tall ships.

The section's lifting device was removed in 1966, but the elevating towers remained until their removal in the summer of 2000.

Today the bridge has a clearance over the water of 66 feet (20 m), and a horizontal clearance between spans of 317 feet (97 m). In addition, NYSDOT is planning to replace this bridge within the next 10 years.

== See also ==
- List of fixed crossings of the Hudson River
