= Menands, New York =

Menands
- Village
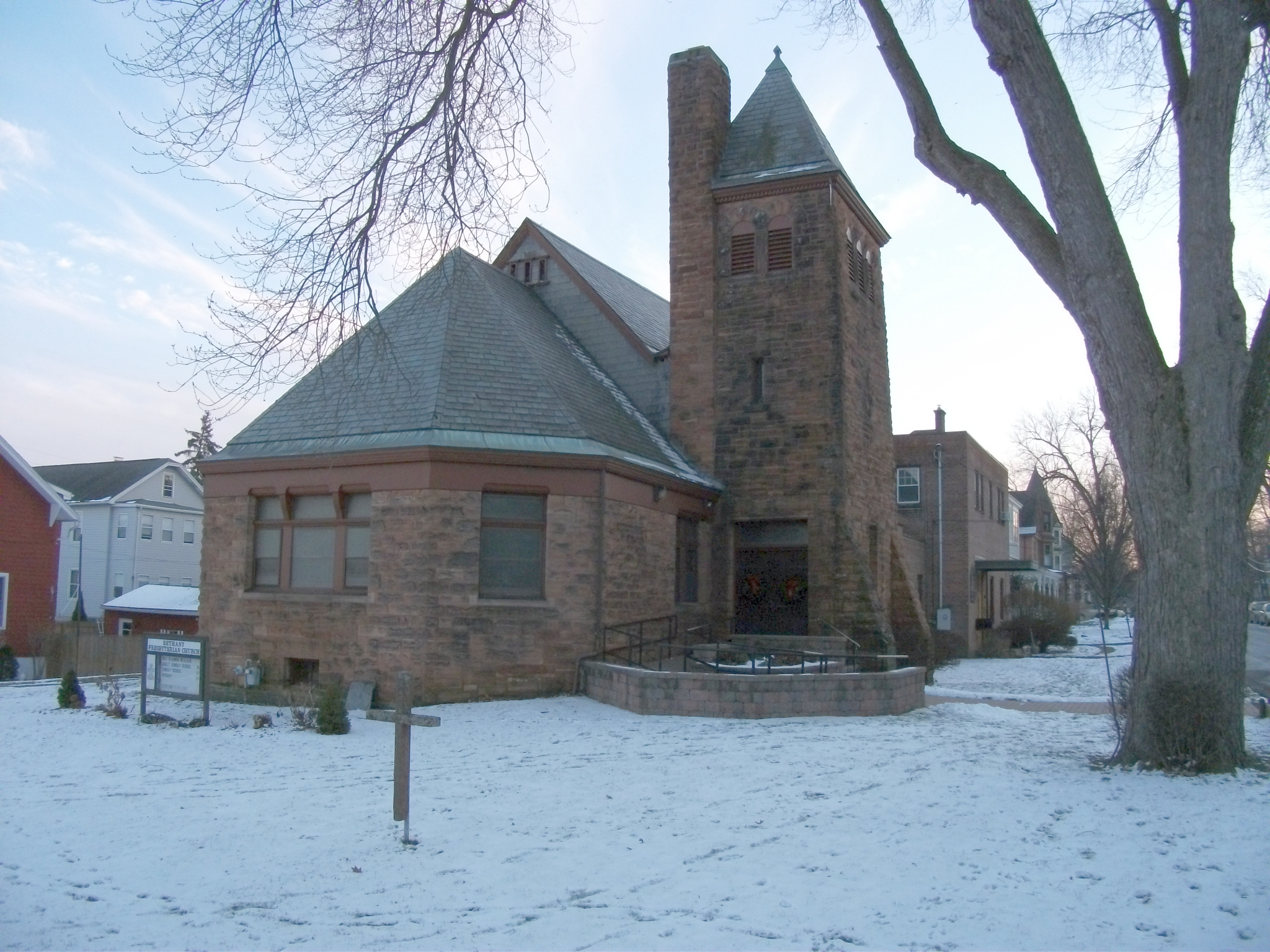
- Former Bethany Presbyterian Church in Menands, New York

- Seal
- Etymology: For Louis Menand, an early landowner
- Motto: Urban-Suburban Village
- Location in Albany County and the state of New York.

- Location of New York in the United States

- Location in New York Menands (the United States)
- Coordinates: 42°41′36″N 73°43′37″W
- Country: United States
- State: New York
- County: Albany
- Town: Colonie
- Settled: 1842
- Incorporation as Village: August 14, 1924

Government
  - Mayor: Brian Marsh
  - Deputy Mayor: Tim Lane
  - Trustee: Lisa Neuman
  - Trustee: Nicholas Kalogridis
  - Trustee: Molly Harbour

Area
  - Total: 3.31 sq mi (8.58 km^{2})
  - Land: 3.06 sq mi (7.93 km^{2})
  - Water: 0.25 sq mi (0.65 km^{2})
- Elevation: 36 ft (11 m)
- Lowest elevation (sea level): 0 ft (0 m)

Population (2020)
  - Total: 4,554
  - Density: 1,487.5/sq mi (574.31/km^{2})
- Time zone: UTC−5 (EST)
  - Summer (DST): UTC−4 (EDT)
- ZIP code: 12204
- Area code: 518
- FIPS code: 36-46536
- GNIS feature ID: 0956959
- Wikimedia Commons: Menands, New York
- Website: menandsny.gov

Menands /mɪˈnændz/ is a village in Albany County, New York, United States. The population was 4,554 at the 2020 census. The village is named after Louis Menand. The village lies inside the town of Colonie and borders the northern city line of Albany.

== History ==
Menands would have been first spotted by Europeans circa 1609, when Henry Hudson dropped anchor somewhere near Cuyler or Pleasure Island during his voyage on the river later to be named after him. This would be the furthest north on the river that Hudson would go in the Half Moon. Today, those islands are connected to the mainland, and are the site of Interstate 787 exits 6 and 7, which includes the cloverleaf interchange with NY 378 and the Troy-Menands Bridge.

When the Erie Canal was constructed in the 1820s, it passed through what would become Menands. Bridges spanned the canal to allow access to the land between the canal and the Hudson. From north to south they were Richardson, Mix, Leary, Keyes, Kanes, Lundergans, Island Park, Delaware and Hudson Railroad, and Garbarance. Most of the names of the bridges were those of the neighboring farm owners.

Louis Menand settled in the village in 1842 and established an important horticultural business. He at first rented land that later became the Home for Aged Men, then in 1847 bought 11 acres of land where the Albany-Watervliet Turnpike (today Broadway) met the road going to Ireland's Corners (today Loudonville); that road is today called New York State Route 378. When the Albany and Northern Railroad was built in 1856, it established a stop in present-day Menands and named the stop "Menand's Crossing", since Menand was the only landowner in that area at the time. When the Albany and Northern became part of the Delaware and Hudson, a station was built at that stop and called "Menand's Station". In the early 1920s, rumors circulated that the city of Albany was going to annex the area, so on August 23, 1924, a vote was taken and the village of Menands was incorporated by a vote of 167 for and 47 against, the population of the new village at that time being 1,272 people. The boundaries of the new village were those of the 15th School District of the town of Colonie. The original boundaries did not include what are now the Sage Hill Lane, Sky Hollow, and Roost Country Estates; those were annexed later and continue to be in the North Colonie Central School District.

In 1938, the first large scale Federal Housing Administration (FHA) multiple housing project in Upstate New York was conceived by Harry D. Yates on 13 acres (53,000 m^{2}) of land in Menands. The land was purchased for $20,000, from the Van Rensselaer family, which had owned it since 1639. Original plans called for 30 buildings, but cost overruns trimmed it to 13. All thirteen were named for historic people and locations in the Capital District; subsequent additions have kept to that tradition with the exception of Tremaine House, named for a former New York State Comptroller and Yates House for a former manager of Dutch Village.

In 1940, the now-defunct New York Herald Tribune declared Dutch Village to be "one of the most interesting scale housing developments in the East". The steeped roofs and brick construction were designed to reflect early Dutch architecture. Wards Lane at the time was small and unpaved on a steep slope, but by using money from a federal program designed to pave "farm to market" roads, the project was able to improve the road to Dutch Village without any cost to the village of Menands.

One of the largest printing plants in the eastern USA existed in Menands in the forties and fifties. Williams Press (aka: J. B. Lyons Co.) at its prime employed more than 1,000 people. Built on Broadway with rail tracks behind, Williams printed many of today's magazines such as Business Week, Sports Illustrated and many others, plus most of the New England telephone directories. They were forced to close because of labor issues, location constraints and outdated equipment.

The village's current motto, "Urban-Suburban Village", and its official seal, came into being as part of the village's 50th anniversary celebrations in 1974. The motto and seal were chosen based on contest entries submitted by local school children at Menands Elementary school. Two boys came up with the design for the seal, and the motto was chosen from an entry by a girl in the school's seventh grade class.

== Geography ==
According to the United States Census Bureau, the village has a total area of 3.4 square miles (8.8 km^{2}), of which 3.2 square miles (8.3 km^{2}) is land and 0.2 square miles (0.52 km^{2}) (6.45%) is water.

Menands is along the Hudson River on the west bank. The village is within the town of Colonie, which is also to the north and west, with the city of Albany to the south. The village is mostly flat with a gentle slope to the west.

== Demographics ==
Historical population
Census	Pop.	Note	%±
1930	1,522		—
1940	1,764		15.9%
1950	1,803		2.2%
1960	2,314		28.3%
1970	3,449		49.0%
1980	4,012		16.3%
1990	4,333		8.0%
2000	3,910		−9.8%
2010	3,990		2.0%
2020	4,554		14.1%
U.S. Decennial Census

=== 2020 census ===
As of the 2020 census, Menands had a population of 4,554. The median age was 37.6 years. 19.1% of residents were under the age of 18 and 16.6% of residents were 65 years of age or older. For every 100 females there were 93.6 males, and for every 100 females age 18 and over there were 92.7 males age 18 and over.

100.0% of residents lived in urban areas, while 0.0% lived in rural areas.

There were 2,085 households in Menands, of which 26.6% had children under the age of 18 living in them. Of all households, 37.1% were married-couple households, 25.1% were households with a male householder and no spouse or partner present, and 29.4% were households with a female householder and no spouse or partner present. About 37.6% of all households were made up of individuals and 11.6% had someone living alone who was 65 years of age or older.

There were 2,259 housing units, of which 7.7% were vacant. The homeowner vacancy rate was 1.5% and the rental vacancy rate was 7.6%.

Racial composition as of the 2020 census
Race	Number	Percent
White	2,566	56.3%
Black or African American	887	19.5%
American Indian and Alaska Native	9	0.2%
Asian	732	16.1%
Native Hawaiian and Other Pacific Islander	0	0.0%
Some other race	103	2.3%
Two or more races	257	5.6%
Hispanic or Latino (of any race)	231	5.1%

=== 2000 census ===
As of the census of 2000, there were 3,910 people, 1,906 households, and 968 families residing in the village. The population density was 1,225.1 inhabitants per square mile (473.0/km^{2}). There were 2,073 housing units at an average density of 649.5 per square mile (250.8/km^{2}). The racial makeup of the village was 83.76% White, 9.10% African American, 0.13% Native American, 4.35% Asian, 0.95% from other races, and 1.71% from two or more races. Hispanic or Latino of any race were 2.71% of the population.

There were 1,906 households, out of which 20.2% had children under the age of 18 living with them, 39.5% were married couples living together, 8.3% had a female householder with no husband present, and 49.2% were non-families. 43.7% of all households were made up of individuals, and 15.5% had someone living alone who was 65 years of age or older. The average household size was 2.00 and the average family size was 2.79.

In the village, the age distribution of the population shows 18.5% under the age of 18, 5.1% from 18 to 24, 29.5% from 25 to 44, 26.5% from 45 to 64, and 20.4% who were 65 years of age or older. The median age was 43 years. For every 100 females, there were 86.7 males. For every 100 females age 18 and over, there were 83.9 males.

The median income for a household in the village was $48,456, and the median income for a family was $62,083. Males had a median income of $42,905 versus $31,745 for females. The per capita income for the village was $36,288. About 1.6% of families and 5.4% of the population were below the poverty line, including 4.1% of those under age 18 and 11.0% of those age 65 or over.

== Arts and culture ==
=== Amusement ===
In the mid-late 19th and early 20th centuries, Menands was a popular destination for entertainment and amusement. Pleasure Island and Park Island (constructed in 1866) had trotting tracks and various entertainment venues. In 1884, the Island Park Association leased the race course, Island Park, directly north of Pleasure Island. It was considered one of the fastest and safest in the nation.

Among the festivities and activities at Pleasure Island were a two-mile (3 km) bicycle race, a sack race, barrel race, swimming exhibition, trotter race, and fireworks. In 1907 Al-Tro Island Park renovated Pleasure Island, Al-Tro was named for being halfway between Albany and Troy, and the park's manager boasted of surpassing Coney Island. The park had a 900-foot-long (270 m) and 40-foot-wide (12 m) boardwalk, with amusements on each side. About halfway down the boardwalk was an amphitheater that could seat 4000, it was one of the largest in the state. At the time Al-Tro Park was considered the finest pleasure resort in northern New York. In the early 1920s Al-Tro closed and the concept was used in the late 1920s by nearby Mid-City Park, an amusement park along Broadway on the other side away from the river, it had a roller coaster, merry-go-round, roller skating rink, and swimming pool; it too would close after a few decades. It was replaced by the current Mid-City Shopping Center.

Two Guys was just one of the retail locations in Menands that made Menands a shopping destination for the surrounding area. In addition to Two Guys there was a Woolworth, Montgomery Ward, several grocery stores, and various other shops along Broadway. The Two Guys location on Broadway, located next to the Troy-Menands Bridge, was one of only two in the area, the other being in downtown Schenectady. Another retail landmark in Menands was the Montgomery Ward Retail Store and Warehouse built in 1929, it was one of nine similar buildings built in the 1920s, and one of four that still remain. The building had its own railroad spur that allowed boxcars to be unloaded inside, making delivery of goods to the building easier. Montgomery Ward left the building in the early 1980s. Today the building is office space, mostly geared towards state agencies. Woolworth was located at the Mid-City Shopping Center, it closed in 1997.

=== Important locations ===
- Albany Rural Cemetery- though most of the cemetery is outside the village, a portion along Cemetery Drive purchased by the cemetery in 1920 is within the village
- Troy-Menands Bridge- crosses the Hudson River and connects the village to the city of Troy
- Riverview Center- former Montgomery Ward store and distribution center, today this Art Deco office building houses video game developers Vicarious Visions and state workers, and has 1,000,000 sq ft (93,000 m^{2}) of space. It also is the tallest building in the town of Colonie
- Capital District Farmers Market- The Capital District Cooperative, Inc., created in 1933, is one of the largest farmers markets in the region
- The Albany Felt Company Complex, Menand Park Historic District, Henry M. Sage Estate, and St. Agnes Cemetery are listed on the National Register of Historic Places.

== Infrastructure ==
=== Fire department ===
Menands has a local volunteer fire department. Menands Fire Co.#1 was founded March 3, 1923, and was incorporated in February 1931. In 1936, the Hudson Mohawk Volunteer Firefighters Association was founded at the Menands Fire Co. In 1983, Menands Fire Co.#1 moved into the new Fire House, adjacent to old Fire House. The old Fire House was renovated for use as the Menands Police Department and Village Court.

=== Police department ===
The first constable in Menands served in a part-time position. The first police chief was appointed by the Village Trustees in 1924, when the village was incorporated.

== Sports ==
Baseball was also a popular entertainment venue in Menands bringing in spectators from across the region. Chadwick Park was home to the Albany Senators who played in the New York State League, Eastern League, International League, New York–Pennsylvania League, and the modern Eastern League. On May 30, 1924, the Senators played a double header at home against the Pittsfield Hillies, the first game lasted 9 innings but the second game went for 20, it is still one of the longest double headers by number of innings in professional baseball. In 1928 Chadwick Park was rebuilt, in 1929 it was renamed Hawkins Stadium, and in 1930 General Electric installed lights for night games.

It was at Hawkins Stadium that the New York Yankees played the Albany Senators in 1931 before a crowd of 6,300; Babe Ruth hit two home runs. The Senators folded in 1959. It too was demolished to make way for the Mid-City Shopping Center and a department type store, which would eventually close and be replaced by the New York State Office of Workers Compensation Board.

From June 12, 1947, to September 2, 1963, Empire Raceways was a popular entertainment venue. It was a quarter mile paved oval track and was located close enough to the Hudson River that spectators would sit on the Troy-Menands Bridge and watch the races for free. The venue also hosted an estimated crowd of 8,000 in 1951 for a Bar-20 Ranch Party featuring movie actor William Boyd as Hopalong Cassidy. The location would later become the site of a Two Guys Department Store and Interstate 787. (Note: Geolocation of Empire Raceways: 42.7007°N 73.7142°W)

== Notable people ==
- George Deukmejian (1928–2018), 35th governor of California, was born in Menands.
