= Murray–Darling steamboat people =

List of people in Australian riverboating

This is a list of captains and boat owners and others important in the history of the Murray-Darling steamer trade, predominantly between 1850 and 1950.

All entries relate to items on the list of Murray–Darling steamboats.

== List ==
william

Name	Born	Died	Owned	Captained	Notes	More
Acraman, Main, Lindsay & Co.	1855	1890	Culgoa; Kennedy; Leichardt; Sturt		John Acraman, George Main, John Lindsay (Lindsay left c. 1870)	
Adams or Adamson				Victoria 1869; Cumberoona 1870; J.H.P. 1870. Pearl 1872; Adelaide 1872; Cumberoona 1879		
George Balfour Air	c. 1826	12 May 1903	Rothbury; Success (part)	Success 1877–1895; Rothbury 1891–1899	He was married to Jane (c. 1829 – 9 October 1905)	
Daniel Alexander			Mayflower 1884–1890	Mayflower 1884, 1890	"Black Alec" Alexander, a hawker who may have been African-American, a man of immense strength (Mudie p. 143); Made off with the boat after repossession by bank According to Mudie, acted as cook on Australien; drowned after falling overboard. (Mudie p. 161)	
George Henry Alexander	1875	15 December 1939		Corowa 1911–1913, 1919; Marion 1911, 1914; Princess Royal 1912; Ellen 1912; Ruby 1914, 1917, 1921; Colonel 1924; Gem 1924	Born at Menindie, he moved to Morgan around 1880. He worked for James Nutchey and Hughie King before qualifying for Captain's certificate. Worked for Gem Navigation Co. and their successor Murray Shipping Co. He married Mrs. R. Thamm and turned to hotel business 1925.	
Charles Anderson	c. 1871	1 August 1942		Adelaide 1912–1939	"Swan" "Swannie" Anderson, was fifty years on the Murray, starting as a deckhand on the Kelpie.	Anderson
William John Anderson		1 July 1949	Excelsior		"Dollar" Anderson worked on the Echuca Wharf.	
Robert Anderson	c. 1840	13 July 1889		Providence 1866, 1867; Bogan 1868, 1869? Ariel 1868–1875; Nil Desperandum 1873, 1877; 1880	"Bob" Anderson of Mannum, probably no relation to the above, was father of Murray Anderson. He may have skippered Bogan 1868, 1869 (Mudie p. 80)	Anderson
(Robert) Murray Anderson	c. 1869	15 December 1934	Wilcannia with Hoad? Rothbury 1911	Wilcannia 1906; Rothbury 1911, 1917	Son of "Bob" Anderson	Anderson
Max Anderson	20 May 1903?		Rothbury	Rothbury 1940, 1948 (Mudie p. 132)	Son of Murray Anderson, owned Mildura slip.	
Anderson (unresolved)				Ariel 1893, 1894		
Alexander Arbuthnot	1853	7 June 1914	Arbuthnot 1912–1913; Murrabit		Born in Bendigo, he worked at Robson's sawmill, Echuca (later owned by D. Munro), around 1875. In 1889 he founded Arbuthnot Sawmills at Koondrook, which became the largest such in Australia. and exists to this day.	
Samuel Armfield	c. 1860	26 June 1933		Murrumbidgee 1898, 1907, 1908	He lived at Goolwa, drowned while fishing at Murray mouth. A son, Herbert Alexander "Hooky" Armfield was a carpenter and boatbuilder in Goolwa.	
(Johann) George Arnold	1863 (Mudie p. 189)	25 May 1949	Golconda −1894; Saddler 1894– J. G. Arnold; Mundoo; Wilcannia 1911– Renmark (part) : 1914–1916; Avoca c. 1920–	Golconda; Saddler 1894, 1901; Tyro 1912; Rothbury 1912; Renmark 1943 (Mudie p. 133)	Born in Sweden, arrived in Adelaide 1889. Worked as boat builder in Mannum; bought Mannum slip after Randell died. He was partner with Mortimer Charles Crane as M. C. Crane and Co. ( –1902).	Arnold
Laurence Milo "Peter" Arnold	28 October 1910		Murrabit 1948– Tarella 1953	Golconda; Avoca	Son of George Arnold	Arnold
Benjamin William Atkins	27 May 1846	1919		Goolwa 1874; Princess Royal 1875, 1876; Rob Roy 1893, :1896–1898, 1906; Barwon 1910; Marion 1910; Wm. Davies 1913	"Ben" Atkins served as master on most of Gem Navigation Company's steamers. He married Susan McBeath (1854 – 16 January 1931) in 1875, lived at Goolwa. Their son Cecil Percy Kintore Atkins was later with the Highways and Local Government Department in charge of River Murray punt maintenance, and possibly their steamboat Oscar W..	
Walter Francis Bailey	May 1856	8 November 1931	Surprise "... owned three boats"	Surprise 1892; Clyde 1897; Maggie 1899; Colonel 1905; Resolute 1905, 1906; Rothbury 1906; Barwon 1910; Enterprise 1910; Wm. Davies 1912; Arbuthnot; Goldsbrough 1915; J. G. Arnold 1917, 1918, 1921	Originally a compositor for the Riverine Herald of Hay, Walter Francis "Wild Man", "Never Sleep" Bailey (Mudie p. 183) held record for longest service on the river. Lived at Echuca until 1917, when he moved to South Australia, but skippered Success one last time 1931. (Mudie p. 187); Married to Mary (c. 1860 – 27 March 1942), they had three sons: Walter, Burton and Frank and five daughters: inc. Mabel Finlayson and Mary Blatchford.	
Walter John Bailey	c. 1886	7 June 1946	Eric (became W.F.B.); Success 1926– Waikerie 1926–1929	W.F.B. 1922, 1923, 1926, 1931; Success 1928, 1931, 1935		
Burton Gordon "Bert" Bailey			W. F. B. (part)		Second son of W. F. Bailey; served in some capacity on the W.F.B. 1925; Married May Carroll in 1917.	
John Bails	22 April 1861	26 April 1952		Pyap 1906–1911	John Bails worked for Charles Oliver on Queen then at A. H. Landseer's store at Milang. He moved from Milang to Claire in 1910 and was mayor of that town 1927–1929; his son Gordon was mayor 1941–1946. Purchased Success, Waikerie and five barges from W. Tinks in 1926.	
John Banks	1833	1876	Beechworth (part); Jane Eliza (part)	Jane Eliza 1869, 1870, 1872	John Banks owned Beechworth and Jane Eliza with George S. Smith as Smith & Banks. Their store at Wahgunyah was lost in the 1867 floods. Married Isabella; His sister Elizabeth (c. 1835 – 27 August 1871) married George S. Smith around 1865.	
William Barber	25 September 1833? He may have been born as early as 1829.	21 January 1922	Lady Augusta; Providence	Lady Augusta 1862–1866; Ruby 1859; Melbourne 1859; Albury 1860; Murray 1862; Gundagai 1862; Lady Augusta 1862–1866; Queen 1865; Jolly Miller 1866–1869; Providence 1866–1868, :1870–1872; Culgoa 1872; Vesta 1873; Cumberoona 1873–1875; Lady Daly 1876; Victor 1881; Industry 1885–1905	William Barber of Cockenzie, Scotland, sailed from England to Melbourne on the Lioness with Robert Kay for Francis Cadell, was a member of first Lady Augusta crew, was mate on the Albury, owned the Lady Augusta and Providence, He was in command of Melbourne in 1859 when she broke up crossing the Murray mouth. He joined the snagging service on the Industry sometime before 1884. William Barber married Eliza (or Elizabeth) Hennessy of Goolwa in 1859 (Jim Ritchie married her sister Wenfried).	
J. Alexander Barber				Ruby 1891; Pearl 1891	Son of William Barber, worked as mate under Miers, later of Berri.	
Robert Barbour	January 1827	4 August 1895	Wagga Wagga 1879		Sawmill owner and steamboat proprietor, member of N.S.W. Legislative Assembly 1877–1880 and 1882–1894.	Main article
John Barclay	c. 1826	1 November 1886		Gundagai 1857–1864	Member of Cadell's Lioness crew 1853	Barclay
James Barclay		29 May 1914		Albury 1870, 1871, :1874, 1875; Maranoa 1870–1875, 1879; Wentworth 1872	"Jimmy" Barclay, perhaps brother of John, lived in Goolwa.	Barclay
Edward Barnes		19 October 1885		Cumberoona 1870–1872, 1876; Riverina 1874–1876; Undaunted 1876; Resolute 1877, 1878, :1882, 1885; Victoria 1879; Rob Roy 1880; Lancashire Lass 1881; Success 1881; Emily Jane 1882	Ned "Black Angel" Barnes married Elizabeth (c. 1831 – 9 April 1897). He drowned in a futile attempt to rescue their 12-year-old son, who had fallen in the river.	
Barrenger				J.H.P. 1872; Princess Royal 1872, 1873	Perhaps Thomas Barrenger (c. 1831 – 14 January 1919), who married Mary Jane Oliver (c. 1844 – 16 January 1929), sister of Captain Charles Oliver.	
Edward Baron	c. 1847	4 January 1907		Decoy 1878, 1881, 1885, 1886	Baron lived at Glanville House, Glanville, married Jane Eleanor Gunn (c. 1851 – 22 August 1911) in 1877; died on Governor Musgrave.	
Daniel Berger		November 1920	Wandering Jew 1893–1899	Wandering Jew 1893–1899	Jewish businessman of Forbes, later bankrupt, returned to Europe.	
Bergman or Berghmann				Mannum 1912	Perhaps Captain Alex Bergman or Berghmann, hero of the wreck of the Bittern 1885	
Charles Berthon		10 May 1880		Enterprise 1875	In charge of snagging party on Murrumbidgee 1872–1880. Married Charlotte Jenkins of Buckingbong ( – 2 March 1880), lived at Narrandera. Charles hanged himself two months after her death.	
Anthony L. Blake				Lady Darling 1864; Lady Daly 1864, 1868	Manager of Cobb & Co in 1859 and Victorian Stage Co., Agent for Murray & Jackson, 1861, 1867. It is likely that he, like Jackson, was an American.	
Fred Blake				Queen 1873; Moolgewanke 1875; Sturt 1877; Excelsior 1879	Fred Blake was captain of Moolgewanke 1875, when her boiler exploded. He later worked as mate on the Lady Daly.	
Frederick W. Blundell			Sapphire 1911–1912	Sapphire 1911, 1912	He was charged with a breach of the Liquor Trading Act in 1912.	
Charles Claus Bock	c. 1843	4 December 1919	Golconda 1887	Menindie 1875; Ariel 1876–1879, 1892 1896; Kennedy 1883; Pearl c. 1885; Golconda 1887; Waradgery 1893	"Charlie" Bock was born in Glückstadt, Germany, and settled in Mannum in 1869. He married Mary Evelyn Randell (c. 1852 – 29 October 1927), eldest daughter of Thomas George Randell, in 1875. Was (Violet Sarah) Rose Bock, who married James Percy Randell (22 April 1867 – 4 January 1914) a sister?	
John Clark Bowden	c. 1845	7 April 1924			Partner, Cramsie, Bowden & Co.	C., B. & Co.
David Bower	c. 1832	25 May 1901	Riverine (part) 1863–1870; Murrumbidgee (part) 1866– Riverina 1887	Riverine 1863–1870; Murrumbidgee 1869–1873; Elizabeth 1874–1876; Trafalgar 1877–1886; Nile 1886, 1892, 1893, 1895, 1897–1899; Invincible 1888	Partnership with J. Duncan dissolved 1869 "Davie" Bower purchased the wrecked Riverina 1887, but appears only to have taken her for two trips to the Murrumbigee. His wife Margaret (born 21 July 1845) was still alive in 1943. They lived at Bowers Bend, Echuca.	
William Bowring	c. 1852	28 July 1924	Emily Jane; Prince Alfred; Marion	Emily Jane 1894, 1899	W. Bowring & Co. were store owners of Wentworth and Mildura	Bowring
F. Boxall				Lady of the Lake 1882, 1885	He had a leg amputated 1887 following an injury. What relation to Marianne Louise Boxall, who married Fred Payne (both of Echuca) in 1862 and Alice Boxall who married Payne in 1874? Fred Payne was owner and occasional skipper of Lady of the Lake.	
Thomas Brakenridge	c. 1830	11 March 1881	Vesta 1871–1872; Excelsior 1873–1876	Vesta 1871, 1872; Excelsior 1873–1876	He married Mary Inglis (c. 1839 – 3 September 1903); they lived at Port Elliot	
Harry Brand				Industry 1923–1928, 1930	Born in Port Lincoln, son of William Brand, who (with brothers Jim, Harry and George) built the Overland Corner Hotel c. 1866.	
James Murray Brand				Queen 1924	Son of Harry Brand (1837– ); cousin of Harry Brand above. He later lived on the Decoy converted to a houseboat. His sister Martha Brand (c. 1868 – 28 November 1939) married Jim Nutchey.	
Harry Brennan			Fairy 1892; Wanera 1939	Alpha 1911	Traded along the Murray. With son Laurie and wife Gwen (née Beelitz) lived on houseboat (ex-steamer) Wanera 1939	
George William Brown	c. 1807	1 August 1877		Grappler 1867–1872	Lived at Port Adelaide	
John Humphrey Brown			Pioneer 1875–1880; Eureka 1881– Golconda 1881–1882; Florence Annie c. 1882		Partner with James Ritchie sr. as Brown & Ritchie, boat owners. Florence Annie was named for his eldest daughter	
Herbert J. Brown			Nile (part) 1911–1927; Jandra (part) 1906–1911; Pearl (part) 1914–		"Herb" Brown, partner with Walter "Wally" Brown as Brown Brothers of Bourke, owners and operators of trading steamers.	
Walter Radcliffe Brown	1862	6 April 1935	Nile 1911–1927; Jandra 1906–1911; Pearl 1914–		"Wally" Brown, with Herbert J. "Herb" Brown trading as Brown Bros. of Bourke owned and operated trading steamers. They retired around 1927. Wally was organist for the Presbyterian church in Bourke.	
"Paddy" Browne					Drove Rothbury, Success and Australien for W. Wilson (Mudie, p. 148, 161)	
Bruce				Duke of Edinburgh 1870–1872		
Wilson Horace Budarick			Murrabit (part, with brother)	Murrabit 1919	Lived at Murray Bridge. His brother Arthur (c. 1882 – 28 September 1935) was killed when his bicycle and a truck collided.	
William Bulled		c. 24 July 1904		Kingfisher 1879, 1880; Goldsbrough 1880; Wardell 1893	Conducted snagging operations from the Wardell 1893–1899 then the Melbourne. He died insolvent.	
John Charles Burgess	c.1839	8 March 1889		Waradgery 1874; Lady Daly 1875; Murrumbidgee 1877–1880; Victoria 1878, 1884; Maggie 1885; Invincible 1888	He married Mary Jane; they lived at Moama, and had at least two daughters. He drowned while crossing the river after an evening in an Echuca hotel.	
Joseph M. Burnaby				Pioneer 1881, 1882	Married, lived in Echuca −1885	
D. Burns				Industry 1941		
Rev. William John Bussell	c. 1855	6 June 1936		Etona (1&2) 1894–1912	Church of England minister	
L. F. Butcher				Marion 1944		
Rev. W(illiam) Corly Butler		15 March 1955	Glad Tidings 1894, 1895	Glad Tidings 1894, 1895	Primitive Methodist pastor, lived in Morgan, moved to W.A. 1897.	
Thomas Buzza	c. 1833	25 April 1904	Emily Jane 1875	Emily Jane 1877, 1880; Emily Jane (2) 1882–1887	Sawmill owner	Buzza
(Wentworth) Victor Byrne	c. April 1892			Ellen 1920; Gem 1921, 1923; Decoy 1924; Wm. Davies 1924; Success 1926, 1929, 1931, :1933–1935; Merle 1953	Born at Wentworth, enlisted May 1916, but discharged as medically unfit for service due to previous ankle injury.	
James Manning Byrnes	c. 1838	9 October 1924			In charge of snagging party	Byrnes
Thomas Bynon	26 December 1858	27 August 1945		Murrumbidgee 1876; Wagga Wagga 1876, 1885 :1903–1905, 1912, 1916; Alert c. 1880; Struggler	Tom Bynon came to Narrandera 1870. He married Selina Broad, lived at Narrandera; they had three sons and three daughters.	
Francis Cadell	9 February 1822	1879	Lady Augusta; Share of many more.	Lady Augusta 1853; Sir Henry Young 1854; Gundagai 1856	With his partner William Younghusband, was the first to run a commercial steamer, the Lady Augusta on the Murray in 1853. Founded River Murray Navigation Company.	Main article
Charles Cantwell	c. 1853	30 April 1916		Murrumbidgee 1884; Nile 1887, 1896; Trafalgar 1887–1899; City of Oxford 1890; Ulonga 1913	He was married to Anne (c. 1857 – 26 August 1944) and lived at Echuca. One of their sons was killed at Gallipoli.	
Charles Cantwell jr.				Wm. Davies 1921; Ellen 1921; Colonel 1924; J. G. Arnold 1925; Pevensey 1930–1932; Success 1941	A son of Charles Cantwell (1853–1916), and may have skippered some of those boats here attributed to him. He and his wife were aboard Pevensey when she burned 1932.	
William Symington Carlyon	18 August 1859	c. 5 September 1936		Invincible 1886; Freetrader 1888; Elizabeth 1893; Barwon 1894, 1896, 1897; Australien 1901; Wanera	"Billy" Carlyon was deckhand on the Kelpie, then captain for Permewan, Wright & Co. Later ran hotels in Echuca and Moama.	Carlyon
Thomas Symington Carlyon (Snr)	1866	20 October 1925		Reportedly captained an (unnamed) River Murray steamer.	A brother of Captain William Carlyon, he became a wealthy hotelier. His son was former AFL player and later hotelier Thomas Symington Carlyon Jnr.	Carlyon
Ben Chaffey	c. 1876	3 March 1937	Marion 1908		Chaffey, Salmon & Dunne owned Tolarna, Moorara, Garnpang, Tapio stations. Best known as owner of racehorses Manfred and Whittier.	Main article
John Henry Chaplin		c. 26 February 1917		Dispatch	Chaplin was grocery and drapery trader on Lower Lakes and river, based at Goolwa.	
C. Christie				Rob Roy 1880	Perhaps typo for J. F. Christy	
John Fray Christy	1844	13 November 1924		Pioneer 1875–1876; Murrumbidgee 1876; Goldsbrough 1877, 1878; Moira 1878; Lancashire Lass 1879–1881; Resolute 1881; Riverina 1883; Rothbury 1883, 1885.	Originally from Hertfordshire, he ran river steamers for ten years before taking over the Travellers Rest Hotel, Boileau (near Echuca) in 1883 then around 1910 turned to farming. He was married to Mary Dorothy; they had five sons and three daughters.	
Church				Kingfisher 1874; Undaunted 1875–1876; Pearl 1875, 1876; Enterprise 1876; Goldsbrough 1876;		
Spencer Clarke			Murrumbidgee 1923–1946	Murrumbidgee 1923–1946; Hero 1943–1949	"Spinny" Clarke of Echuca owned Murrumbidgee and barge J. L. Roberts; carried posts and sleepers. Skippered Hero for the Forest Commission. Their daughter Phyllis married Harry Thomas Pearce in 1942	
M. Cole				Princess 1877; Enterprise 1882; Goldsbrough 1882, 1883; Corrong 1883, 1884; Agnes 1883, 1884	Lived in Echuca until at least 1887. A Cole was mate of Goldsbrough 1906.	
G. Cole				Edwards 1888, 1889	Possibly typo for M. Cole.	
John Colebatch				Viola 1902		
William Grimwade Collins	c. 1865		Alpha 1909, 1914; E.R.O. 1923; Queen 1925; Kookaburra 1927; Excelsior; Pyap; Jolly Miller	Fairy 1893, 1894; Jolly Miller 1908, 1909; Alpha 1918–1923	"Old Bill" "Pop" Collins of Renmark, born in Euston, was married to Emmie Louise (c. 1872 – ). Son Morris (Maurice?) and daughter Amy Alpha were experienced riverboat sailors. Daughter Pearl Royal married Neil Dryburgh Wallace (they divorced in 1954, citing Hilary Hogg as co-respondent), and was the first woman in Australia to hold a skipper's ticket. Two other sons, William (mentioned by Ian Mudie op. cit. p. 89) and Norman, also held captains licences.	
Norm. Collins			Avoca (part); Hero (part) 1950	Hero 1950	Partner, Collins Bros. of Mildura.	
Thomas Connell				J. H. P. 1866–1870		
John Cornish			Kennedy (part)	Kennedy 1864–1867		
James Counsell	c. 1819	5 August 1894			Partner with John Whyte (see below) as Whyte, Counsell, and Co., wholesale grocers and shipowners. (Whyte left the company in 1884; John Counsell jr. and Thomas Smith were admitted and the company went into liquidation 1887). James Counsell was the father of the architect Frank Counsell.	
Charles Cowley			Pyap c. 1939	Lancashire Lass 1878; Alert 1879, 1880; Goldsbrough 1880; Golconda 1882; Brewarrina 1893.	Cowley married Elizabeth Ann Cook, stepdaughter of Captain Edward Barnes, in 1875. They rescued Mrs. Lindqvist from drowning 1884 but never found her baby. In 1890 their house in Echuca East burned down. He later ran the Echuca Railway Refreshment Rooms ( –1917). He bought Pyap c. 1939 for his own use as a houseboat.	
Syd. Cowley				Little Wonder 1898	Son of Charles.	
Cowley (unresolved)				Elizabeth 1895		
John Cramsie	1 February 1832	18 February 1910			Partner, Cramsie, Bowden & Co.	C., B. & Co.
Mortimer Charles Crane	11 January 1876	10 November 1948		Saddler 1902; Nellie 1906, 1907, 1909, :1911–1915, 1919–1921; Renmark 1920	"Mort" Crane was a son of Joseph John Crane (14 August 1842 – 1 August 1919), an associate of W. P. Auld. He was principal of M. C. Crane and Co., which for a time included J. G. Arnold. He married Florence Gertrude Baseby (1879–1947); lived at Mannum, then Norwood. He was licencee of the Bridgewater Hotel 1924–1936.	
Edward Daniel Cremer	c. 1817	c. 5 February 1892		Maranoa 1873; Jupiter 1876; Enterprise 1877		Cremer
Daniel Cremer	c. 1835	May 1942		Cato 1896, 1897; Jupiter 1902, 1907, 1908 :1921, 1922, 1928; Florence Annie	Dan was son of Edward Cremer	Cremer
Edward (Edwin?) Crowle				Kingfisher 1878; Goldsbrough 1880; Riverina 1880–1882	He was later engaged in snagging the river near Wilcannia.	
J. Cummins				Shannon 1895; Success 1896		
George Frederick Curson	c. 1822	1 April 1898	Cato (part) 1883–		Partner of Joseph Nash	Curson
Robert Davey				Enterprise 1869; Kelpie 1872; Murrumbidgee 1874	He may have been the Robert Davey who was given two years' jail for the knife attack on John McGowan in June 1874.	
William Davidson				Lady Augusta 1853; Leichardt 1856, 1857; Sturt 1857	Brought Lady Augusta from Sydney then through Murray mouth 16 August 1853 for Francis Cadell.	
William J. Davies	c. 1830	15 April 1903	Pride of the Murray 1865–1877; Nile 1885–	Pride of the Murray; Nile 1885– Kelpie; Trafalgar 1877	Known as "Commodore" or "Bill" Davies	Davies
William E. Davies	15 September 1859	23 October 1902		Pride of the Murray 1878–1884; Nile 1887; Trafalgar 1888	Son of William J. Davies.	Davies
Davis				Bunyip 1885–1886	Stuck in the Darling during the 1885–1886 drought. Around 1889 skippered (perhaps the same) Bunyip (owned by Matthew Johnston) on the Manning River.	
John Davis		9 November 1872		Providence 1872	Captain of Providence when shortly after leaving Menindie her boiler exploded, killing him and three crew.	
T. J. Davis				Emu 1895		
Albert De Forest				Emma 1886; Barwon 1886; Enterprise 1887; Lancashire Lass 1895; Glimpse 1897	"Bert" De Forest and F. O. Wallin were awarded medals by the Humane Society for rescuing a drowning girl in 1895.	
Dean				Edwards 1932		
Henry Dewing				Kelpie 1869; Bunyip 1878 (Mudie p. 90)	Lived at Echuca. His wife died 22 August 1879. Perhaps the Henry Dewing (c. 1839 – 7 November 1897) of Barwon Downs.	
James Dickson	c. 1851	29 January 1914		Emily Jane 1878–1880; Pearl 1880–1882; Lancashire Lass 1882–1888; Corrong 1888, 1889; Rodney 1892–1894	"Jimmy" Dickson of Echuca was captain of Rodney 1894 when she was burned by striking shearers. He died in Fremantle. His daughter Janet Harkes Dickson married T. Charles Goode, grandson of Thomas Goode of Goolwa, in 1898.	
William Dickson	c. 1855	28 October 1912	Moira	Maranoa 1871; Goolwa 1871; Albury 1873; Wentworth 1874–1876; Cadell 1879, 1880, 1883, 1884; Moira 1886, 1889, (Mudie pp. 86.89) 1892–1898.	"Willie" Dickson lived at Goolwa, later Semaphore He was married to Helen (c. 1849 – 25 October 1906). Report of him being captain of Pearl 1881 probably typographical error. Possibly not related to "Jimmy" Dickson.	
Dickson (unresolved)				Wm. Davies 1894		
(Ernest) Edward Diener	c. 1866	27 December 1923	Eva Millicent 1893–1903; Merle 1903–1917; Kookaburra 1917–1923	Eva Millicent 1893–1903; Merle 1903–1917; Kookaburra 1918–1923	Edward Diener started life on the River as cabin boy for Hugh King, then ran a profitable firewood business on the Darling. He owned and ran a series of trading boats, also the barge Flo. He married Katherine "Katie" Cooper (c. 1866 – 9 January 1954) in 1897.	
J. Dodd				Vesta 1872; Telegraph 1872	Perhaps James Dodd of Coorong, who died of alcohol poisoning 28 November 1872.	
Eliezer Hainsworth Dodd	c. 1829	8 February 1900	Mundoo	Mundoo 1878, 1890, 1893, 1896	"Happy" Dodd was involved in the construction of the Overland Telegraph Line. He built Mundoo and with it traded up and down the Murray until at least 1896. His daughter Alice married a son of George Grundy in 1883.	
Elwyn Eliezer Dodd	9 July 1863	18 October 1941		Victoria 1893; Cato 1897, 1898.	Son of "Happy" Dodd, he married Ellen Cave in 1882, she divorced him 1905; he married again, to Bertha Alwina Miegel (1882–1958); they lived at Mannum.	
Eliezer Hainsworth Dodd jun.	16 January 1870	10 May 1949	Fairy (part); Ventura 1909–1911; Sunbeam	Fairy 1898; Ventura 1909–1911; Sunbeam. Gem 1943; Renmark 1949	"Hain" Dodd, son of "Happy" Dodd, was partner in Johnson & Dodd running Fairy between Morgan and Renmark 1898. He married Margaret Barbara Tait (daughter of John Tait) in 1890; He divorced her in 1900. He married again, to Bridget G. McGrath; their home was "Ventura" in Goolwa. He was mayor of Goolwa 1916 and a successful angler. He died in the cabin of his launch Sunbeam.	
Joseph Dorey	c. 1841	10 April 1923		Alfred 1877, 1880, 1881; Goldsbrough 1878; Freetrader 1878–1881; Saddler 1879; Princess 1880; Murrumbidgee 1880–1885; Adelaide 1881; Ethel Jackson 1880, 1881	Originally Dore, perhaps Doré, he married Isabella Simpson (c. 1847 – 9 April 1908); they lived at Echuca, then Williamstown	
George Roy Dorward	c. 1831	9 March 1906		Victoria 1866–1869; Waradgery 1872, 1874; Jane Eliza 1874; Rodney 1875, 1876, 1878–1880.	A Murray pioneer, he was partner with William Davies in the firm Dorward & Davies c. (1875–1884); lived at Moama.	Dorward
George Roy Dorward jun.	1853			Kelpie 1877, 1878; Pearl 1879, 1880; Rodney 1878–1884; Alert 1901; Excelsior 1916	Son of George R. Dorward.	Dorward
Thomas Dowland	c. 1833	27 March 1887	Express 1869–1870	Express 1869, 1870	Carpenter, builder, undertaker and Murray trader.	Dowland
Lewis Downs	c. 1860	8 February 1943	Alfred (part)		Partner in Knox & Downs (1912–)	Downs
(William) Henry Drage	30 May 1901		Trix 1950–	Wm. Davies 1926; Marion 1928, 1931–1942; Decoy 1928; Wanera 1935	He married Myrtle, lived in Renmark; moved to Mildura in 1941, served as RAAF wireless operator during World War II.	
Dubois				Mundoo 1914; Renmark 1914; Gem 1915; Queen 1915; Goldsbrough 1915; Tyro 1915	Worked for J. G. Arnold carrying timber for the Blanchetown lock, irrigation pumps.	
Duffy				Emu 1893, 1894		
James Duncan			Riverine (part) 1863–1870 Murrumbidgee (part) 1866– Riverina	Murrumbidgee 1867; Pioneer 1870	Partnership with D. Bower dissolved 1869; May have owned Dora with J. Wrench.	
William Peter Dunk	1838	19 August 1924	Jupiter; Milang; Murray		He was a partner in the firm of A. H. Landseer (dissolved 1890). He married Emma (c. 1836 – 9 November 1917); they lived in Milang. Third son Albert Landseer Dunk (c. 1865 – 21 July 1938), worked on Bourke then managed Landseer's office in Morgan.	
Abraham Dusting	c. 1851	1 June 1908		Golconda 1880, 1881; Pioneer 1881; Edwards 1882; Jane Eliza 1883–1886; Resolute 1889, 1890, 1899; Hero 1891, 1893–1897; Corrong 1896; Rita 1904; Barwon 1908; Invincible	"Abe" Dusting of Echuca, born in Cornwall was stuck at Curranyalpa during 1885–1886 drought. His certificate was suspended for a month in 1881 for an act of negligence (setting a line across the river without keeping proper watch) which resulted in damage to the Moira. Curiously, Dusting's steamer and Hill's barge were both named Golconda.	
Edward Dutton	c. 1832	29 January 1887	Express 1879		Dutton was owner of Goolwa Brewing Company and mayor of Goolwa 1875, later of "Ardune", Lucindale.	
Charles William Dyer	c. 1862	28 September 1927	Royal	Royal 1908–1917	He married Mary McKeown in 1800; they lived in Renmark.	
Charles T. Earnshaw	April 1845	8 April 1930	Undaunted 1875 (part); Eva 1891	Eva 1891	Built engines and was part owner of Undaunted. Built Eva in 1891. Sold it about 10 years later to James Green	
Alfred James Ebery				Pioneer 1881; Edwards 1882, 1883; Rothbury 1884, 1885; Riverina 1885	He was mate of the Roma when she caught fire 1886.	
John Egge	1830	11 September 1901	Endeavor 1868–1874; Murrumbidgee 1887–	Endeavor 1868–1874; Prince Alfred 1875	Anglophile Chinese who settled in Australia, a successful river hawker.	Egge
Edwin David Egge	1869	4 June 1946		Murrumbidgee 1896, 1898, 1899; Lady of the Lake 1896	"Ned" or "Ted" Egge was a son of John Egge; hairdresser and businessman in Renmark.	Egge
Charles Elfenbein	c. 1825	25 June 1884		Vesta 1871–1873; Queen 1872		
Richard James Evans			Edwards 1911, 1916		Evans owned the Barmah sawmill, 80 km upstream from Echuca; founded Evans Bros. sawmill, Echuca in 1923. Mayor of Echuca 1932; Married Margaret (c. 1842 – 21 July 1936) children included Fred, William (died 7 September 1932), Albert	
Charles Evans				Emily Jane 1881		
Edward Evans	c. 1833	3 April 1902		Rothbury 1901		
P. Evans				Edwards 1918		
Robert Felgate	c. 1851	12 October 1884		Queen 1873, 1874	A publican of Wentworth and Wilcannia, he married Marianna Saunders (c. 1850 – 15 July 1931) in 1873.	
George Ferguson			Pioneer 1907		Lived at Port Adelaide.	
Edward R. Fitzgerald				Industry 1887		
Richard Stanislaus Foley		21 November 1904	Maggie 1881–		R. Stanislaus Foley was an auctioneer of Ballarat.	
Fred Foord	c. 1840	December 1878		Wahgunyah 1866–1868; Waradgery 1868–1872; Lady Augusta 1870; Jane Eliza 1872		Foord
Fordyce				Australien 1905		
James Foster				Edwards 1939	Jim "Big Did" Foster, a man of immense size (Mudie p.–143), an official guest at the commissioning of the Coonawarra.	
Edward Charles Fowler	1847	c. January 1940		Elizabeth 1873–1874; Burrabogie 1874; Emily Jane 1875, 1876; Decoy 1878; Fairy 1881; Ethel Jackson? Rodney 1886; Hero 1892; Emu 1893	Lived at Echuca, later Morgan. He was declared insolvent in August 1885. He later moved to Western Australia, where he died. Ian Mudie mentions Sam Fowler, captain of Emily Jane in 1878 (Mudie p. 91).	
Albert Francis	16 August 1874	21 September 1913	Alpha 1898– Waikerie (part)	Alpha 1898–	"Bert" Francis built Alpha (which he ran for a few years) then Royal and Waikerie, in partnership with W. Tinks.	Francis
John Raglan Frayne	c. 1854	12 October 1923		Moolgewanke; Paringa; Nil Desperandum; Princess Royal; Britannia; Victor 1903	Frayne captained boats for Tonkin, Fuller and Martin (especially Victor). He married Jemima Jessie "Jena" Loney (c. 1860 – 10 August 1928) in 1882, lived in Goolwa.	
Fredericks				Express 1878		
Freeherne				Emu 1876		
Thomas Henry Freeman	31 March 1858	6 April 1939	Agnes; Alfred; Canally 1907– Emma; Shannon; Success	Riverina 1879; Agnes 1879–1883; Corrong 1884–1886; Emma 1885, 1886; Rothbury 1890–1892; Success 1889, 1891–1893, :1897, 1902–1909; Shannon 1894–1899, :1901–1904; Canally 1912–1916, 1918	"Tommy" (also nicknamed "Hooky" "Wingy" and "Blondin" – Mudie p. 165) Freeman married Emma Mansfield Osborn (c. 1859 – 19 April 1949) in 1883, had a large family, lived in Echuca, retired to Heathcote around 1919.	
William Thomas Mansfield Freeman				Corowa 1923; Ruby 1923	Son of T. H. Freeman, and possibly also skippered some of the boats listed above.	
John Jennings Fulford	1853	27 May 1923	Waradgery (part)	Waradgery 1889	"Jack" Fulford was captain of Waradgery 12 October 1889 when its barge Willandra sank with the loss of bargehand Robert Johnstone. Fulford was blamed for allowing bales to be stacked too high (and blocking egress from the barge's forecastle), but acquitted by court of inquiry. Fulford married Alice Glew, daughter of William Glew, mate and engineer of Waradgery. They had ten children.	
John Arthur William Fulford	c. 1884	c. 5 January 1953		Wanera (Mudie p. 129)	"Billy" Fulford was son of Jack Fulford.	
Benjamin Grove Fuller	1815	9 June 1902	Paringa		Partner in the firm of Tonkin, Fuller & Martin.	Fuller
Benjamin Mark Fuller	1846	20 September 1912	Moolgewanke (part)	Duke of Edinburgh 1868–1874; Vesta 1870; Moolgewanke 1874–1876; Waradgery 1878; Paringa 1883; Gem 1883; Princess Royal 1891	A son of B. G. Fuller, he was skipper and part owner of Moolgewanke when her boiler burst, killing two men, and held partly responsible.	Fuller
J. Fyfe				Undaunted 1877; Rob Roy 1878–1880; Goldsbrough 1880; Ferret 1884	James Fyfe ( – 25 May 1899) ran a sawmill at Colinroobie near Narrandera. He married Agnes Keltie (c. 1831 – 13 November 1897) around 1862. But it is not certain this is the same person.	
M. Gabb				Endeavour 1908	"Well known at Kalangadoo and Penola"	
Hedley Gelston		14 October 1879	Shannon (part)	Shannon 1880	Hedley and his brother Hastings Atkins Gelston ( – 9 May 1941) owned Shannon. Hedley drowned near Wentworth when he fell from that boat.	
Gem Navigation Co.	1909		Barwon 1909–, Corowa 1909–, Decoy 1909–, Ellen 1909–, Enterprise 1909–, Gem 1909–, Mannum 1909–, Marion 1909–, Murrumbdgee 1909–, Princess Royal 1909–, Rob Roy 1909–, Ruby 1909–, Tarella 1909–, Waradgery 1909–, Wm. Randell 1909–		Consortium formed by amalgamating assets of Ben Chaffey, Laurie Landseer and Hughie King. Bought out Permewan Wright in 1910	
Benjamin Germein	c. 1826	c. July 1893		Corio 1857	"Ben" Germein is remembered as a hero of the Admella and skippered Corio through the Murray mouth a number of times until she foundered.	Main article
James T. Gibbs				Federal 1905–1908; Goldsbrough 1910, 1911	James Gibbs lived at Murray Bridge.	
John Gillon				Goolwa 1867–1871; Wentworth 1870–1875; Maranoa 1870, 1872; Queen 1874–1875; Corowa 1881; Shamrock 1886 (Mudie p. 231)	His son Michael drowned 1873 after falling from Queen, where he had been playing.	
Arthur Glew		13 December 1888	Ferret (part) 1884– Waradgery (part) 1886	Waradgery 1887, 1888	Arthur was the oldest son of engineer John A. Glew of Echuca. He ran swimming baths in Echuca 1880. He owned Ferret and Waradgery in partnership with William Wilson; when partnership dissolved he took Waradgery (Mudie p. 157–159)	
William Glew					"Willy" Glew, perhaps a brother, built Ferret with William Wilson 1883; was mate and engineer on Waradgery 1889. He ran the swimming baths in Echuca 1890 and was later licencee of the Steampacket Hotel, Echuca.	
Edward Henry Golding	c. 1868	20 October 1940		Victor 1890, 1891, 1894; Kingfisher 1892	Proprietor Gol Gol Hotel 1891–1892; He married Laura, daughter of B. M. Fuller, in 1892, moved to Perth	
Thomas Goode	1846	14 July 1921	City of Oxford 1903–		"Tom" Goode was partner of Goode & Johnston.	Main article
(Thomas) Charles Goode	c. 1874	22 June 1947	Florence Annie; Milang 1909– Murrabit; Renmark (part)	Pioneer 1906; Dispatch 1908; Florence Annie; Milang 1909; Ruby 1911; Mannum 1926; Murrabit 1939	Charles Goode was eldest son of Tom Goode, traded on Lower Murray and Lower Lakes.	Main article
John Gribble				Julia 1874; Pride of the Murray 1875; Murrumbidgee 1875, 1876; Brewarrina 1877–1880, 1882, 1886; Elfie 1892	One of the few to regularly service Walgett, in Brewarrina, "his bijou boat" (Mudie p. 92)	
George Henry Griffin	c. 1894	24 July 1945	Merle	Merle 1941–1943	"Harry" Griffin of Murray Bridge commissioned M.V. Merle and conducted river cruises between Murray Bridge and Morgan.	
Edgar Griffin			Merle 1945–1952	Merle 1943	Inherited Merle from brother George, sold her to W. R. Bowhey in 1952.	
George Grundy	c. 1818	4 July 1902			Bargemaster behind Providence when she blew up 1872.	Grundy
Robert Grundy	c. 1846	19 May 1919		Menindie 1893; Saddler 1893; Tolarno 1893, 1902, 1906, 1913, 1914, 1916, 1917, 1919	"Bob" Grundy was son of George Grundy, worked for Knox & Downs, died on the Tolarno.	Grundy
John Grundy	1858	20 March 1946		Blanche 1877; Bourke 1891–1896; Tarella 1897–1909; Renmark 1913; Kelvin 1920; Milang	Son of George Grundy; worked for the Renmark Irrigation Trust from around 1915.	
George Grundy jun.	c. 1861	18 April 1940		Brewarrina 1893; Decoy 1900; Murrumbidgee 1902–1904; Industry 1905, 1909, 1912, 1916, 1919, 1920, 1922; Dispatch 1910	Son of George Grundy, he lived at Goolwa. He became, in 1922, South Australia's first lockmaster, at Blanchetown. He was married to Florence Ellen (c. 1864 – 3 July 1922)	
Grundy (unresolved)				Victoria 1912; Francis Cadell 1892; Menindie; Wilcannia 1911, 1912		
William Gunn	c. 1826	7 October 1885	Queen		Gunn ran the Crown Hotel, Wentworth. He married Sarah (c. 1826 – 29 November 1891)	
F. Gurney				Emu 1872–1874		
Haines				Barwon 1912, 1913	See also Haynes	
C. Haines				Colonel 1933; Ulonga 1935, 1936	Perhaps the same person as C. F. Haynes below?	
William Hampson			Nellie 1882–	Undaunted 1878, 1879, 1881; Invincible 1879–1881; Nellie 1882, 1883.	In 1882 his house, in Echuca, was totally destroyed by fire. Amongst the debris was found the medal presented to him by a grateful William McCulloch in 1879. The fire had proved the "gold" medal was of some base metal with a gold finish.	
(Wilhelm Robert) Frederick Hanckel	c. 1876	13 November 1947		Ventura 1909; Barwon 1910; Despatch 1911; Wilcannia 1911	"Fred" Hanckel married Daisy Mazzarol (c. 1882 – 28 May 1911) of Mannum in 1909; they lived at Waikerie.	
Frederick Christian Hansen		11 July 1897	Golconda (part) 1877–	Kingfisher 1875–1878; Golconda 1877–1880; Riverina 1878; Tyro 1880; Agnes 1880; Rob Roy 1880, 1881; Ariel 1881; Emily Jane 1881; Moira 1881–1884; Maggie 1885–1897	"Chris" Hansen emigrated from Copenhagen. He married Frances Alderton McConnell in 1871; they lived at Echuca. He was once sued (unsuccessfully) for slander by Janet, the wife of James Laing. He died after falling from the Echuca wharf to the deck of the barge J. L. Roberts while loading wool.	
R. Hanson				Lancashire Lass 1881		
Harris				Rob Roy 1914		
Harrold Bros.			Wentworth 1865, 1866			Harrold Brothers were best known as marine operators, as for the City of Adelaide
Alfred Hart				Princess Royal 1895; Marion 1900–1908	Alf Hart married Jane Anne Johnston of Goolwa on 10 May 1882. Jane's father James was engineer on (unnamed) River Murray steamers. Mentioned by Ian Mudie (op. cit. p. 135)	
Harry Hart				Excelsior 1913, 1914	Mentioned in article by "The Skipper"; Married Sarah Jane Jefferies (died 1910) in 1878; lived Goolwa then Stepney then Murray Bridge.	
J. Hart				Victoria 1885, 1886, 1888–1891		
S. Hart				Rothbury 1911		
W. Hart			Excelsior	Excelsior 1889		
Hart (unresolved)				Corowa 1895; Ellen 1895, 1896; Ruby 1895, 1896; Nellie 1898, 1899; Lancashire Lass 1905; Wm. R. Randell 1907; Princess Royal 1914; Wm. Davies 1914	Which of these refer to whom?	
Hay Steam Navigation Co.	1874	1878	Burrabogie 1874–1878; Corrong1874–1878		Operated between Hay and Echuca; Consortium of wealthy squatters (J. A. Tyson, "McGaw & Others") and James Ritchie sr. Liquidated 1879; McCulloch & Co. purchased the boats and barge Pimpampa.	
A. Haynes				Wanera 1931		
Charles Frederick Haynes				Oscar c. 1919, 1925	"Charley" Haynes of Echuca was captain of Oscar in July 1925 when cook J. "Tassy" Russell fell overboard and drowned.	
John Haynes				Ellen 1923	William Henry "Gus" Haynes, mate of Wm. Davies who fell overboard and drowned 27 August 1925 may have been a brother. Early reports had John Haynes as the victim.	
Haynes (unresolved)				Princess Royal 1912		
John Heigh				Prince Alfred 1875		
J. Hemfield				Excelsior 1912		
W. Henderson				Decoy 1924; Ruby 1924; Colonel 1926; Wanera 1930		
Samuel Richard Heseltine	c. 1849	19 December 1920	Menindie; Shannon	Prince Alfred 1875; Menindie 1875, 1876, 1879; Shannon 1880–1882, 1886	Partner with W. L. Reid. A brother, Augustus Frederick "Gus" Heseltine (c. 1854 – 26 April 1879), fell from Menindie and was drowned near Overland Corner	Heseltine
John Heseltine				Shannon 1880, 1881, 1885	A brother of Samuel. In charge of Shannon when she was largely destroyed by fire October 1885.	
Charles Hill		c. September 1907		Murrumbidgee 1869, 1874; Cumberoona 1869; Pioneer 1870; Julia 1871; Melbourne 1872, 1873, 1875, :1877, 1878, 1882, 1884, :1887, 1888, 1890; Freetrader 1873; Princess 1874, 1875; Moira 1876, 1881–1883; Elizabeth 1878, 1879; Invincible 1882; Pride of the Murray (Mudie p. 118)	"Stuttering Charley" Hill ran hotels in Quorn, Broken Hill and Mitcham. He was declared insolvent 1872. He married Margaret (c. 1858 – 11 June 1936); they had five sons and three daughters.	
James Hill				Melbourne 1872-1892	Captain James Hill was born as James Merton 20 November 1831 at Constantine, Cornwall to Oliver Merton and Mary Ann Hill. He emigrated to NSW, Australia in the early 1850s, and worked on the Hunter River based at Morpeth. He married first Mary Doonan at West Maitland 4 September 1854 but deserted this marriage in 1862, taking his eldest son with him. He subsequently remarried bigamously as James Merton to Mary Grace Dalling on 21 August 1863 at Hotham, Vic. In 1865 his first wife advertised that she assumed he was deceased and planned to remarry. After this, Captain Hill reverted to the use of the name James Merton Hill. After his second wife's death, he remarried for a third time to Frances Maria Bunker, 21 June 1889 at Hare Street, Echuca, Vic. Captain Hill moved to Hornsby, NSW after his retirement, and died 20 October 1919 at his home "Falmouth", Peats Ferry Road, Hornsby, NSW. Captain Hill had 10 biological children to his three wives, and one adopted child. Of these five survived into adulthood and left descendants.	
E. W. P. Hill				Wm. Davies 1925	Captain when mate "Gus" Haynes lost overboard	
Robert Hilton			Express (part)	Express 1871, 1872	Part owner of Express with H. Parker. Probably Capt. Robert Hilton ( – c. 9 June 1891) of Clarendon, who married Sarah Squire in 1856, better known as a blue-water sailor.	
Bill Hoff				Shamrock	Hauled redgum for Gibbons Bros.	
Hilary Harding Hogg	18 July 1913			Alexander Arbuthnot 1942; Hero 1942–1944; Murrumbidgee 1947, 1948; North Star 1950; Coonawarra 1950; Success 1956	"Paddy" Hogg engineer.	Hogg
Hoskins				Adelaide 1881		
Herbert Bristow Hughes	c. 1821	18 May 1892	Decoy 1878–		Hughes owned Kinchega station at Menindee, commissioned construction of the steamer Decoy and barges Reliance and Croupier to carry his sheep, but soon abandoned the idea and sold her. He married Laura White (c. 1829 – 5 January 1909), for whom the town of Laura was named, and whose brothers Samuel and Frederick were prominent in the history of Wirrabara.	
Hull				Wm. Davies 1925		
Hume Bros			Milang 1920		Concrete pipe manufacturers	
Charles Frederick Hunt	1852	3 April 1941	Invincible 1887–	Invincible 1887–1892	"Charley" Hunt purchased Invincible from McCulloch & Co.,(Mudie p. 99) and rebuilt her. He purchased derelict Freetrader.	Hunt
John Innes	c. 1830	18 March 1910		Invincible 1878; Goldsbrough 1878, 1887; Kelpie 1879–1893; Rodney 1887; Corrong 1888; Wm. Davies 1894; Colonel 1896–1899; Nile 1898	"Johnny" Innes was born in Edinburgh and employed by, successively, L. McBean; Cramsie, Bowden and Co.; and Permewan Wright and Co. He married Wilhemina Carlyon (c. 1852 – 26 August 1915), sister of Captain William S. Carlyon.	
Robert Isherwood				L'Orient 1889; Struggler 1901	"Bob" Isherwood was married to Florence ( – 1 September 1954)	
Peleg Whitford Jackson	c. 1834	24 April 1912	List (part)	Settler 1862, 1863; Lady Daly 1865	Transportation entrepreneur from America	Murray & Jackson
Gus Jansen				Melbourne 1902 (Mudie p. 234)		
Alfred J. Johnson			Pride of the Murray (part) 1865–1869; Alfred 1869		In 1869 Alfred Johnson of Sandringham relinquished share in Johnson, Davies and Co. to Davies and Locke.	
Charles Johnson				Invincible 1881; Riverina 1882; Kingfisher 1884–1886, 1891; Princess 1887; Barwon 1888, 1899; City of Oxford 1890, 1894; Success 1892; Elizabeth 1893; Arbuthnot 1913.	He was seriously burned when Arbuthnot caught fire 1913.	
Carl Peter Johnson				Glimpse 1885 (Mudie p. 121); Success 1891, 1892		
George Johnson				Albury 1881		
Peter Johnson				Murrabit 1914 or 1915		
R. Johnson				Cadell 1880; Renmark 1925–1927; Colonel 1930; Wanera 1933, 1936; Oscar 1935		
W. Johnson				Glimpse 1899		
Johnson (unresolved)				Enterprise 1882; Corrong 1882, 1883; Kelpie 1888; Adelaide 1891; Sunbeam 1899; Clyde 1899; Success 1903; Alert 1906; Colonel 1910	Which of these refer to whom? more needed on: Johnson & (E.H.) Dodd of Morgan owned Fairy 1898; Johnson, Davis & Co. contractors owned Pride of the Murray 1865	
George Bain Johnston	28 November 1829	29 May 1882		Gundagai 1856; Albury 1858, 1864, 1865, 1868–1872, 1874; Moolgewanke 1860; Wentworth 1870–1873, 1875, 1876; Maranoa 1869–1872, 1874; Napier 1875, 1876; Queen of the South 1878, 1880; Ellen 1880	Member of Cadell's Lioness crew 1853, made pioneering trips in the Quiz, Lady Augusta and Albury; For the relationships between Johnston and Barclay, see "Barclay" above	Main article
Peter Johnston	c. 1859	2 June 1900			Son of G. B. Johnston; a marine engineer, moved to Fremantle.	
George Johnston	January 1864	18 September 1925		Captain Sturt 1916, 1919, 1923, 1925	"Gumtree" Johnston, son of G. B. Johnston; married Miriam Ottaway in 1893; lived at Blanchetown. Captained s.s. Cadell in the Spencer Gulf trade. He was partner in Johnston & Murphy. Died aboard Captain Sturt at Lock 9.	
Peter Johnston	1826	2 June 1881		(perhaps) Maranoa 1866	Brother of G. B. Johnston; died of exposure after falling from the steamer Cadell at the Goolwa wharf.	
Thomas Johnston	c. 1825	13 August 1889	Jolly Miller	Lady Augusta 1857	He worked as mate with George B. Johnston, whom Ian Mudie (Mudie p. 145) identifies as a cousin; helped sail Lioness from Liverpool to Melbourne in 1853, Lady Emma from the Clyde to Port Elliot in 1855. He was married to Georgina Johnstone (c. 1824 – 23 December 1883). They had a son Thomas Adam Johnston ( – 13 August 1846); daughter Jane Harkes Johnston married Thomas Goode of Goolwa on 22 March 1872 and daughter Alison Ross Johnston married Edward Goode in 1880.	much confusion with Thomas Johnstone (below)
Thomas Johnstone						Johnstone
Adam Johnstone	c. November 1834	25 September 1905		Menindie (Mudie p. 116); Saddler 1896	Brother of Tom Johnstone	Johnstone
George E. Jolly				Julia 1878; Victoria 1881; Freetrader 1883; Resolute 1886, 1887; Invincible 1887	For a short time in 1886 he held the publican's licence for the Criterion Hotel, Echuca.	
Joy				Struggler 1918		
Robert Kay					Brought out Lioness 1853; Lady Emma (carrying Gundagai and Albury) 1855.	Kay
William Leitch Keir	June 01, 1856	July 27, 1919		Enterprise 1873, 1878–1889; Goldsbrough 1882; Glimpse 1884; Emma 1887, 1888.	Son of William Keir (1826–1905), sawmiller of Echuca. Born 1856 in Collingwood, Victoria, he married Martha Bessie Lucy Rowland in 1884.	
Robert Kirkwood Keir	c. 1859	13 July 1940	Enterprise 1884–1889	Enterprise 1887–1889; Edwards 1911; Adelaide 1916	Younger brother to William Leitch Keir, he was licencee of the Pastoral Hotel, Echuca 1890–1893. He married Mary Jane Montgomery. Their son Robert Henry Keir (c. December 1889 – ) served in France during World War I as bandsman and stretcher bearer, was awarded a Military Medal and Croix de Guerre.	
Hugh Kelly				Wanera 1910; Ulonga 1915, 1918; Invincible 1922, 1925, 1932, 1934	Nicknamed "Murrumbidgee Roarer", he lived at Mildura.	
Thomas Kelly				Australien 1910–1912, 1918,1920 (Mudie p. 163)	A brother of Hugh Kelly; nicknamed "Gentleman Tom", retired to Melbourne.	
Orlando Kenrick				Rodney 1877, 1878; Alfred 1879; Princess 1880–1884		
William Kerr				Express 1873, 1874; Vesta 1874		
John Kerr				South Australian 1888, 1891–1894; Decoy 1889, 1898	He was later proprietor of the railway refreshment rooms at Murray Bridge.	
F. D. Kerridge				Emma 1890–1892		
Hugh King	11 January 1840	7 October 1921	Teviot; Ellen; Moira 1865– Princess Royal; Jane Eliza; Gem; J. H. P. 1872– Ruby	Ruby 1860; Lady Augusta 1861; Gundagai 1862–1865; Lady Darling 1864; Moira 1865–1869; Teviot 1868, 1870; Moira 1869; Princess Royal 1870–1873; J.H.P. 1872; Jane Eliza 1875, 1878	"Hughie" King married Isabel McKenzie (died 1888) and had four sons. He married again, in 1891, to Frances Judd and retired to Morgan. Which King had Mannum 1901? Hugh King Drive, which runs alongside the River Murray at Mildura, may have been named for him, as was King's Row, a block of five houses in Morgan.	King
Hugh William King				Gem 1889–1908; Corowa 1897; Ruby 1899; Ellen 1905; Murrumbidgee 1909	Third son of Hughie King; he lived at Nor' West Bend.	
Charles King				Elizabeth 1879	Possibly a son of Hughie King	
James King			Francis Cadell; Jupiter −1875	Gundagai 1864; Francis Cadell 1866; Ruby; Jupiter 1869–1874	Possibly a son of Hughie King, he sold Jupiter and fled to New Caledonia to avoid bankruptcy.(Mudie p. 115)	
George King			Pilot	Pilot 1915–1917		
M. King			Riverina −1887		Proprietor of Globe Hotel, Crossenvale (1 km south of Echuca)	
Alfred Kirkpatrick	c. 1840	13 April 1919	Albury 1881		Pastoralist of Mount Murchison, Buckanbe, Murweh stations; miner and businessman of Wilcannia: Kirkpatrick & Frew 1874. Married Mary Theresa Quin (July 1849 – 8 July 1941), sister of his partner Edward Quin, in 1869.	
William Knight	c. 1850	28 November 1911		Australien 1902; Rothbury 1902; Goldsbrough 1905; Maggie 1905; Hero 1906; Resolute 1906	He married Mary McCart ( – c. 13 December 1948) and lived in Echuca; they had two daughters.	
George Knight				William Randell 1935		
Robert George Knox	1868	26 April 1948	Alfred (part)		Partner in Donaldson, Coburn & Knox (1899–) then Knox & Downs (1912–)	Knox
Kopp				Albury 1875; Gertrude 1875, 1876	He had previously commanded the sailing vessel Mosquito on the Lower Lakes. Perhaps John Kopp who became light keeper on the hulk Harriet Hope in 1878, then Cape Jaffa and Cape Borda.	
John Heinrich Krause		13 February 1919		Little Wonder 1879, 1880; Murrumbidgee 1880; Adelaide 1881; Alfred 1881–1883; Era 1903	Married to Mary Jane, lived at Echuca, then Mildura, retired to Nuriootpa. Two daughters died 1887 within a month of each other.	
Carl Heindrich Ferdinand Kruse	25 May 1823	27 June 1911		Showboat	He captained the sailing boats Ponkaree and Ada and Clara which was motorised and became Renmark's Showboat	Kruse
James Laing sen.	c. 1819	3 January 1892	Rob Roy; Riverina		Laing was married to Mary.	
James Laing jun.	c. 1840	poss. 24 September 1913	Edwards	Edwards 1875–1879; Undaunted 1879; Rob Roy 1880, 1881	He had his licence suspended for negligence in abandoning a barge loaded with wool and failing to keep an up-to-date log book.	
Thomas Laing			Agnes (part) 1877–1880	Rob Roy 1876; Agnes 1879	The youngest son of James Laing sen., principal of Thomas Laing & Co.	Laing
James T. Laing			Undaunted	Wagga Wagga 1880	Cousin of James and Thomas Laing	
Albert Henry Landseer	10 February 1829	27 August 1906	Bourke (part); Despatch (part); Eliza (part); Gertrude (part); Industry (part)		Businessman and politician with extensive trading and flour-milling interests. He established the township of Milang. W. P. Dunk was for some time a partner	Main article
Laurence Harcourt Landseer	19 September 1876	27 August 1955			"Laurie" Landseer was son of A. H. Landseer; part of Gem consortium 1910–	
Laurence				Rob Roy 1880		
James Lawson				Freetrader 1877; Alfred 1878, 1879; Princess 1879, 1880; Ethel Jackson 1880, 1881; Murrumbidgee 1880–1883	He was later engaged on ocean-going vessels.	
Adam Leishman	c. 1854	2 October 1913		Ruby 1911	Echuca manager of Gem Navigation Co., he acted as skipper during 1911 U.R.U. strike.	
(William) Henry Leonard	c. 1831	26 March 1873	Waradgery 1869– (part)		Shipbuilder of Echuca; partner in Leonard, Symington and Dorward. Lessee of punt ("Hopwood's") and pontoon bridge linking Echuca and Moama. Founded Echuca Meat Preserving Company 1869.	
Richard George Lewen	c. 1824	5 March 1903		Kelpie 1874, 1875; Victoria 1876–1878; Thistle 1879, 1880; Invincible 1880; Lady of the Lake 1880, 1881	Partner in Murray River Fishing Co. with one (perhaps James) Rice. He was the first to be awarded a Master's certificate at Echuca. He married Lucy Alison (c. 1826 – 23 November 1893); Daughter Lucy Ann Lewen, married W. W. Pullar in 1872.	
George Alison Lewen	1854	1929			Eldest son of R. G. Lewen. Wilcannia manager for Wm. McCulloch and Co. in 1885. He married Elizabeth Charlotte "Bessie" Hoseason (daughter of Captain Hoseason) in 1885.	
Richard Frederick Lewen	c. 1856	17 May 1922		Bantam 1883–1901; Alert 1898	Younger son of R. G. Lewen. He married Maria R. Reid ( – 1 July 1935) of Moama in 1880. They later lived in Richmond.	
Henry Robert Lewen	c. 1825	5 March 1895	Bantam		Brother of R. G. Lewen.	
Lewen (unresolved)				Moira 1868; Julia 1870; Gem 1879; Maggie 1905		
Lewis				Maggie 1883, 1884		
Gustaf Lindqvist	c. 1845	10 February 1923		Burrabogie 1877–1884; Resolute 1878, 1879; Corrong 1887, 1888, :1890–1892,1894 (Mudie p, 139),1896; Rodney 1888–1891; Kingfisher 1892; Kelpie 1895; Maggie 1891, 1898, 1899; Alert 1899	"Gus" Lindqvist, born in Sweden, married Isabella Halbert Carlyon ( – 25 January 1937), a sister of Thomas and William Symington Carlyon, in 1875. They lived at Echuca; first at Richmond Hill until that house was destroyed by fire. Later that year she fell in the river and was rescued, but her baby drowned. They then bought a cottage in Mitchell Street. They retired to East Melbourne.	
John Scott Lindsay	c. 1819	29 June 1878		Gemini 1857, 1858 (Mudie p. 70, 199); Lady Daly 1866, 1867; Kennedy 1869; Grappler 1872–1875	Earlier commanded the brig Europa and Sir James Fergusson's yacht Edith. With Randell reached Brewarrina 1859. Married Catherine Reid (c. 1822 – 28 May 1884) and lived at Goolwa. The explorer David Lindsay was a son.	
George Linklater	4 February 1829	15 November 1886		Alert 1879	He built steamers Adelaide 1866, Hero 1874, Alert 1879 and barge Heather Bell 1877. He married Sarah Ross in 1865. George jun. was born in 1866.	
Lubert			Wardell 1909		Snagging operations	
Henry Luth	c. 1837	c. 18 July 1883	Moira 1875–		Sawmiller of Echuca; partner with Samuel Riddell as "Luth & Riddell"	Luth
David Luttet	c. 1820	1 July 1907	Agnes (part)		Businessman of Creswick partner with the Laing brothers and J. Randell, then Randell alone as Thomas Laing and Co.	
William Hele Luxon	c. 1831	23 February 1873		Sturt 1859–1863; Lady Daly 1862, 1864, 1865; Wentworth 1866–1868; Maranoa 1871	Partnership with George Eaton, as traders, was dissolved 1870. He married Jane Miller of Goolwa in 1861; they had four children.	
John Lyons	c. 1856	14 October 1938		Emily Jane 1881; Edwards 1887; City of Oxford 1891	Lived at Echuca	
Lachlan McBean	1810	19 January 1894	Goldsbrough; Kelpie		"Locky" McBean was a wool millionaire who owned Woorooma and Windouran stations and others beside, Moulamein and Royal hotels in Moulamein. Described by Mudie (op. cit. p. 160) as "mean and almost illiterate", he died after being thrown from his buggy.	
Donald McBeath	c. 1819	13 March 1902	Amphibious 1879–1902	Mundoo 1875, 1876; Amphibious	He was earlier captain of sailing ships on Lower Lakes.	
John McBeath	c. 1861	25 May 1938		Amphibious c. 1890–	Son of Donald McBeath; his descendants increasingly chose spelling "McBeth".	
David Donald McBeath	1865	12 July 1927			Engineer on several Murray boats; he married a daughter of R. Murray Anderson.	
Samuel McBurney	c. 1810	18 January 1889		Bunyip 1889	He died in Wollongong hospital after a brick fell on his head while loading at Bulli jetty.	
Alexander McCoy	c. 1822	29 September 1895		Leichardt 1856–1858; Sturt 1856–1858	He was instrumental in founding the Adelaide Steamship Company.	McCoy
William McCulloch	22 October 1832	4 April 1909	(list at McCulloch)		Founder Wm.McCulloch and Co., Pty. Ltd. of Melbourne, the largest transport business on the Murray system 1876–1886.	Main article McCulloch
McDonald				Milang 1913, 1917		
James Mace		c. 1895		Gundagai 1856; Albury 1857; Wakool 1860; Lady Daly 1864, 1865; Lady Darling 1865; Cumberoona 1866–1869, 1871 (Mudie op. cit. p. 224)	"Jim" Mace navigated Wakool/Edward 1860. (Mudie p. 75); His master's certificate was suspended for 12 months after collision with Wahgunyah for which he was found culpable. He was proprietor of Star Hotel, Echuca, 1870–1875. He married Sarah Ann Rouse (c. 1858 – 24 September 1919) around 1857 and deserted her around 1875. He lost two sons by asphyxiation (probably carbon monoxide poisoning) from charcoal embers in a closed cabin on the Lady Daly in 1865.	
Rowley McGraw	c. 1910	1993		Edwards 1950; Coonawarra 1952	With Hilary Hogg, "Spinny" Clarke, Tom Norris and Barney Binks, one of the last certificated skippers on the Murray.	
Mercer M. Mack		6 November 1883		Alfred 1869–1876; Goolwa 1875; Ethel Jackson 1876–1879	He married Margaret "Maggie" Dagmar Dowling (30 April 1853 – 6 September 1880) in 1874. He became publican of the Echuca Hotel, where his young wife died. He killed himself three years later. He had been elected president of the Master Mariners' Association just 6 months previously.	
Rev. J. F. K. McKenzie		c. 1911		Etona (1) 1892	Church of England minister	
James Mackintosh		7 August 1895	Enterprise 1868; Julia 1871–1879; Elizabeth		Proprietor Echuca and Moama Sawmill, employing 500 men. He purchased Wharparilla station around 1878. A son, Stanley, was drowned in the Murray in 1879; the barge John Campbell was named for another son.	
George Alexander McLean	c. 1877	27 October 1912		Corowa 1907; Barwon 1909, 1912; Marion 1909; Ellen 1911; Excelsior 1912	George McLean was one of four brothers who captained Murray River steamers. He married Jane C. Schell (1854 – 3 April 1930); lived Renmark then Morgan.	
Hugh McLean				Tarella 1911–1912; Wm. Randell 1912; Barwon 1912, 1916; Wm. Davies 1916; Marion 1917; Gem 1917, 1942, 1943; Renmark 1933; Pevensey 1937, 1941–1944	He acted as mate on Marion 1942. He later lived at Glenelg.	
Lance J. McLean				Ellen 1923; Tolarno 1924, 1925; Colonel 1927; J. G. Arnold 1927–1929; Wm. Davies 1929, 1930; Oscar W. 1930–1934; Wanera c. 1938; Marion 1941, 1942, 1949; Renmark 1942, 1943; Wanera c. 1938	Lance McLean of Morgan, another brother, was skipper of Ellen when she sank in 1923. He was married to Florence Emily (c. 1898 – 6 March 1938)	
Norman McLean				Wm. Davies 1920	The fourth brother. He and Hugh owned a block at Berri, lived at Pyap.	
John McMillan				Rob Roy 1879; Golconda 1881, 1882; Florence Annie 1882–1884		
Andrew McPherson				Kingfisher 1884	He lost his certificate for three months for drunkenness and thereby losing the owner (a Mr. Foley of Ballarat) a valuable contract.	
George Makin				Marion 1924, 1944; Wanera 1929; Tarella 1938; Gem 1948	Lived at Murray Bridge	
Archibald Manning		12 December 1881		Invincible 1881	He was swept overboard and killed when his steamer and barge collided.	
Andrew Martin	c. 1848	16 October 1897	Charlotte (part); Britannia; Paringa; Victor	Charlotte	Martin, of Callington then Morgan, was partner in Tonkin, Fuller & Martin. (see Tonkin, Fuller). He ran the diminutive Charlotte hawking steamer, which was so profitable that the company invested in more and larger steamers. By the time the Britannia was acquired Martin was the sole owner, as A. Martin & Co., merchants of Renmark and Wentworth. Later boats were the Paringa and Victor. He married Eliza Catharine Fuller, daughter of Benjamin Fuller in 1869.	
William Masson				Mosquito 1857	Masson (or Mason) made pioneering trip to Balranald in 1857.	
W. Mathews				Telegraph 1871; Vesta 1872, 1873; Excelsior 1873–1875		
Alexander Ferdinand Matulick			Shamrock 1890	Ellen 1885	"Fred" Matulick and brother Francis Joseph "Frank" (c. 1859 – 30 August 1939) were boat builders.	Matulick
Joseph Touchstone Maultby	c. 1833	10 March 1915	Hero 1874–1890	Enterprise 1871– Hero 1874–1890	Traded up and down river from his store in Wagga Wagga.	Maultby
Frederick William Maultby	c. 1856	26 September 1932		Pearl 1883	Possibly not related to Joseph T. Maultby.	Maultby
Henry Horn Mennie				Gundagai 1856	Noted deep water sailor who spent one season on the Murray. Sir Thomas Elder took a trip and wrote about the experience.	
G. Merrett				Mundoo 1896		
Merton				Florence Annie 1891		
L. D. Mewett				J. G. Arnold 1923; Corowa 1923, 1924; Tolarno 1924; Decoy 1924–1927; Monada 1944; Pyap 1944		
William E. Miers	c. 1854	23 October 1924	Invincible (part)	Avoca 1879–1882; Ruby 1886–1890; Ellen 1890, 1891; Pearl 1891–1897; Invincible 1897–1900	"Willy" Miers later ran an orange and poultry farm on Cowra Avenue, Mildura, with son Hugh ( – 11 August 1911). Miers Lane, Mildura may have been named for him. He married Katherine Janet McKenzie (c. 1851 – 30 March 1945). She left him, moving to Queenstown, Tasmania where she kept the Queenstown Hotel from 1909 and the Montagu Hotel from 1918.	
Mitchell				Shannon 1904		
John Reid Montgomery			Riverina 1883–1885		Montgomery was prominent Echuca businessman, owner of the Royal Arcade furniture shop. He had Riverina rebuilt after a major fire but was wrecked after striking a snag and, unrepairable, Montgomery was made insolvent, left for Carlton.	
James Morris				Goolwa 1870; Undaunted 1875, 1876; Riverina 1877; Invincible 1878, 1879; Resolute 1879, 1880		
Morrison				Marion 1920, 1921		
Charles Morton				Prince Alfred 1870; Edwards 1886	Morton and Freeman both found culpable after Edwards collision with Emma in July 1886.	
Les Muit? Muite?				Hero 1950		
George Humble Mumby				Alfred (when?)	Father of G. M. Mumby	Mumby
(George) Michael Mumby	13 September 1880	22 February 1944		Rob Roy 1913; Alfred 1917	Captain of Alfred when she sank, killing crewman Charles Thorn. Charged with manslaughter but acquitted.	Mumby
Charles Murphy	c. 1834	18 July 1874	Murray; Goolwa −1872	Goolwa 1870; Maranoa 1871	Murphy and Johnston (as Johnston & Murphy) purchased the steamer Murray in Scotland, hiring Richard Berry to sail her under canvas to South Australia in 1866. Their Goolwa went to Gippsland Lakes in 1872.	
Alexander Sinclair Murray	26 November 1827	26 November 1914	List (part)	Settler 1861, 1862	An American, born in Scotland, skippered Tuapeka on the Clutha River, New Zealand, then partner with Peleg Whitford Jackson as Murray & Jackson	Murray & Jackson
Murray Shipping Ltd.	1919	1954	List		Formed by Murray interests of Permewan Wright, Gem Navigation Co., J. G. Arnold, Knox & Downs and A. H. Landseer	Murray Shipping Ltd.
Daniel Charles Myrick	1812	1893	Providence 1866	Providence 1866	An American who lived at Goolwa or Currency Creek from around 1854 and returned to the US around 1867.	
David Napier				Murray 1861	Skippered the iron hulled screw steamer Murray from Scotland to Goolwa.	
Robert D. Napier	1821	May 1885	Moolgewanke (part); Leichardt (part)		Webb & Napier imported Moolgewanke and barge Unknown in sections 1856, sold to Johnston & Murphy c. 1858. Operated Leichardt with A. McCoy.	main article
Joseph Nash	c. 1838	22 April 1902	Cato (part)	Goolwa 1875, 1876, 1879; Bunyip 1882, 1883; Cato 1883–1889	He lived at Goolwa, later ran businesses in North Adelaide, then "Federal Cash Store", Mildura. He owned Cato with George Frederick Curson. He married Eliza ( – 2 August 1892). Eliza's sister Sarah (1827–1901) was the second wife of G. F. Curson.	
John Clement Newman	c. 1856	12 December 1916		Rob Roy 1876, 1877; Riverina 1882; Edwards 1882; Adelaide 1883; Invincible 1886; Enterprise 1908, 1909; Ruby 1909, 1910; Excelsior 1910	Lived at Mildura.	
Thomas Nolan			Rob Roy 1876?	Rob Roy 1887, 1888	He was found responsible for the collision with Resolute in October 1887.	
James Nutchey sen.	1828	before 1907	Industry −1887		Ship's carpenter, arrived Melbourne 1861 worked on bridges over Yarra; shipwright and sawmiller of Currency Creek in 1866, then with 15y.o. son James on bridge at Murray Bridge. Married Mary, may have died intestate in Bourke 1896 or 1897.	
James Nutchey	1858	12 September 1932		Industry 1880; Corowa 1899, 1907, 1909, 1912; Gem 1903–1915; Ellen 1907; Ruby 1907–1916; Marion 1911; Barwon 1916; Excelsior 1916; E.R.O. 1917–1921; Wilcannia 1923, 1924; Kookaburra 1924–1926	"Jim" Nutchey is reported as "skipper of Gem for 25 years". Skippered E.R.O. at Renmark during the 1918, 1920 floods He traded on the Murray from the Kookaburra; James married Martha Hannah Brand (c. 1868 – 28 November 1939) c. 1892 Children Alex, Harry, Dave, Esther, John, Olive and Gordon. They lived at Morgan, then Qualco	
Edward Nutchey	c. 1860	9 November 1896			Son of James Nutchey sen. of Milang; was engineer on Bourke. Married 1894; wife Eliza A. Nutchey.	
David Nutchey	c. 1865	24 March 1941		Resolute 1891–1899, 1901, 1905; Barwon 1905, 1906; Hero 1906; Lancashire Lass 1908; Oscar 1911, 1914, 1918, 1930; Ulonga 1930–1933	"Dave" Nutchey of Echuca married (1) Ellen Jane Wilson (c. 1868 – June 1906) in 1895; (2) Dinah Flora Bainbridge (c. 1863 – 9 March 1940), a widowed mother. Eldest son David Clarence Nutchey (c. June 1896 – ) was gassed and wounded in France, World War I; daughter Adelaide Ellen (c. 1904 – 9 January 1923), other sons Bervin and Euston.	
Ellen Nutchey	c. 1869	26 January 1939			"Nellie" Nutchey married Bunting Wilson (c. 1868 – 14 January 1916) in 1906	
Alexander Nutchey	c. 1872	27 June 1948		Goldsbrough 1890–1899, 1901; Alert 1891, 1896; Wm. Davies 1902, 1904–1906, :1908; Mascotte 1911; Pevensey 1915, 1916, 1918	"Alex" Nutchey was a son of James Nutchey sen.	
Nutchey (unresolved)				Wilcannia 1893; Maggie 1904; Murrumbidgee 1907; Mannum 1908, 1909, 1912; Princess Royal 1909	Which of these refer to which brother?	
W. John O'Connell		10 April 1903	Moira 1893–1903		"Straight John" O'Connell was mail contractor of Balranald, then Wilcannia, where he owned "Beehive Stores". He was an alderman and owned several racehorses.	
Charles Oliver sr.	c. 1838	6 March 1923	Warrego (part) 1866– Prince Alfred (part) –1875; Avoca (part) 1877; Pyap 1897–1908	Warrego; Prince Alfred 1870–1875; Queen 1875–1878, 1890; Pyap 1897–1908	"Charlie" "Mudlark Charlie" part-owned Warrego then Prince Alfred, first with Edward Walker, then alone from 1873, sold her to John Egge. He and Robert Thomson bought Avoca. He lived at Wentworth then Milang. He married Janet Smith Thomson (c. 1854 – 1 October 1887) in 1875. He retired in 1917; his second wife Catherine died 3 February 1924. Thomas Barrenger married his sister Mary Jane.	
Charles Laurence Oliver	c. 1879	2 October 1936	Queen (part) –1920	Queen 1911, 1919?	With brother Oscar continued running Queen after father retired, selling her in 1920 to R. H. Taylor. Charles married Olive M. Shemmeld of Angaston in 1909. He purchased the Kimba Hotel in 1936.	
Oscar Robert Oliver	c. 1878	18 August 1950	Queen (part) –1920	Queen 1911, 1919?	Oscar, brother of Charles Oliver above, married Mary Lewis Wooldridge (c. 1882 – 6 March 1939) in 1915.	
Olson				Clyde 1901, 1902		
Olsen				Brewarrina 1903? Success 1918.	It is possible these two refer to the same person.	
Ernest "Ern" Orchard				Lancashire Lass 1911; Tarella 1911; Excelsior 1912–1914; Corowa 1912, 1921; Ruby 1912; Princess Royal 1913; Ellen 1913; Wm. Davies 1914; Mannum 1914, 1924; Colonel 1923; Decoy 1923; Capt. Sturt 1926		
James Barnett Packer	c. 1850	26 August 1933		Wentworth 1878, 1887, 1889, 1901	"Jim" Packer helped save Queen of the South when stuck at the Murray mouth.(Mudie p. 128)	
Joseph Ferdinand Page	c. 1837	29 June 1890		Wahgunyah 1869–1877; Saddler 1878–1884; Murrumbidgee 1880; Corrong 1885; Goldsbrough 1888–1890	"Joe" Page was employed by McCulloch & Co. until taken over by Cramsie, Bowden & Co., then Permewan, Wright. He married Catherine Meldrum (c. 1843 – 9 May 1914), lived at "Crossenvale", Echuca.	
William Parker				Kennedy 1866, 1867, 1871, 1872; Ariel 1869; Culgoa 1870, 1871	In 1871 he assisted Constable Murphy in securing the bushranger Baker.	
H. Parker			Express (part)	Express 1870, 1871	Part owner Express with Robert Hilton, based in Goolwa	
Parker (unresolved)				J. H. P. 1872	Probably one of the two above, who may be the same person.	
John F. Patterson				Murrumbidgee 1874, 1875; Little Wonder 1876; Agnes 1877; Riverina 1878, 1884; Julia 1882, 1884; Corrong 1887; Kingfisher 1890.		
M. Patterson				Wilcannia 1915		
Frederick Payne	c. 1833	22 February 1911	Resolute −1879; Invincible 1877–1879; Express 1878; Riverina; Undaunted; Lady of the Lake 1880– Maude	Lady of the Lake 1884, 1887; 1896–1898	Auctioneer, commission agent and boat owner in Echuca.	Payne
Charles Frederick William Payne	1866			Elfie 1896; Pioneer 1897, 1898, 1903; Ellen c. 1910; Marion 1911, 1921–1931; Princess Royal 1911, 1912; Mannum 1920; Ruby 1925, 1931; Tolarno 1926; Renmark; Wilcannia; Tyro; Kelvin 1932; Gem 1936; Merle 1945–1947	"Charlie" Payne, son of Frederick, lived in Renmark; noted for his series of historic Murray photographs. He was on the Gem for 12 years before 1939 and Merle for six.	Payne
Henry George Boxall Payne (perhaps the "W. Payne" in E. Rich & Co. adverts)	1873			Lady of the Lake 1896; Maude 1896–1898; Brewarrina 1904 (Mudie p. 94); Marion 1912; Tyro 1912; Renmark 1914; Ruby 1924; Pevensey 1937, 1939; Gem 1939; Renmark 1940	"Harry" Payne, son of Frederick was, with Brewarrina in 1904, the last steamboat skipper to venture past Walgett. He may have been the Capt. Payne on Cato 1908; he acted as Drage's mate on Marion 1938. His son George Boxall Payne (12 January 1913 – ) was elected to Australian Stockman's Hall of Fame, served in World War II.	Payne
Pearson				Ferret 1890		
Augustus Baker Peirce (generally written "Pierce")	7 October 1840	1919	Possibly Victoria; 1873–1875.	Corowa 1868, 1869; Jane Eliza 1871; Victoria 1873–1875; Riverina 1876	"Gus Pierce", an American, was a colourful sailor, actor, raconteur and artist. Worked on Lady Daly 1864 (Mudie p. 167–176). A. T. Saunders also wrote a thoughtful critique.	Main article
Reuben Pendle	14 November 1899	11 October 1929		Tolarno 1926	Pendle was mate on Gem 1923. He lived in Morgan; died aged 29, after two years' illness.	
Permewan, Wright & Co.	1863				Originally Permewan, Hunt & Co. (1871), the shipping and forwarding company was founded in Victoria by John Permewan (c. 1837 – 23 December 1904), Thomas Permewan (c. 1843 – 16 November 1899) and John Edward Wright (c. 1845 – 11 January 1886). When Wm. McCulloch & Co. sold their fleet in the 1880s, Permewan, Wright became the dominant company. Bought out by Gem Navigation Co. in 1910.	
Perry		c. 25 May 1892		Elfie 1892	Mysteriously drowned 1892, just a month after cabin fire in which deckhand Andrew Salmon was burned to death.	
George Rickinson Swan Pickhills	c. 1839	13 August 1912	Sturt (part)	Queen 1866–1873; Lady Daly 1869–1875; Jupiter 1875; Bourke 1876–1878, 1880; Sturt 1882, 1885–1888, 1890; Mundoo 1895, 1896	Pickhills, son of a Yorkshire lawyer, was stranded at Port Elliot 1860 after the Flying Fish wrecked, given work on Gemini. Stuck in the Darling during 1885–86 drought. One of his last acts on the Murray was to demolish a bridge at Bourke which was impeding navigation. He married Ellen Fanning (c. 1836 – 11 August 1911) of Goolwa on 18 February 1862; they lived at Bourke. C. E. W. Bean mentions Pickhills in Dreadnought of the Darling. His brother, Charles Edward Pickhills (c. 1847 – 13 February 1869) was thrown overboard from Moira and drowned when that vessel hit a snag.	
Gus Pierce					see Peirce above.	
Pollard				Success 1956	"Brick" Pollard mentioned by Mudie (Mudie p. 111); Subject of British Pathe documentary "Floods Hit Sheep Farmers" (1956)	
William Robert Porter	c. 1850	19 November 1921		Pearl 1874; Freetrader 1875, 1876; Jane Eliza 1883; Gem 1883 (Mudie p. 229); Jane Eliza 1883; Ferret 1884; Invincible 1884; Glimpse 1885; Waradgery 1895; Ariel 1896	Born in Taunton, Somerset, Porter was a stepson of Samuel Randell. He was the master of Jane Eliza in 1883 when she collided with the Paringa, and was found culpable.	
A. F. Porter				Tarella 1919–1924	Operated Tarella for the Irrigation Department	
Reginald E. Potter				Barwon 1911; Decoy 1912; Tarella 1913; Excelsior 1913, 1917; Wm. Randell 1914, 1916	"Reg" Potter captained Barwon, crewed by strike-breaking skippers during crew strike of 1911.	
Arthur Edward Price				Murrabit 1921, 1924; Decoy 1926		
J. H. Price				Emma; Enterprise	Traded along Murray with J. Egge? Hard to verify.	
William Whyte Pullar	c. 1841	2 May 1886	Firefly	Firefly; Lady Daly 1878; Murrumbidgee 1878, 1880; Victoria 1879; Corrong 1880–1882	The youngest son of James Pullar of Dundee, Scotland, he also captained Firefly and other McCulloch boats, became Echuca manager for McCulloch & Co. He married Lucy Ann Lewen, daughter of R. G. Lewen in 1872. He died of a heart complaint; his wife married again in 1888. His sister Anne married Duncan Crawford in 1857.	
Fred Pullar				Adelaide 1867, :1869–1871, 1875	Perhaps Frederick James Pullar who was declared bankrupt 1893 after a brief spell as hotelier; relation to W. W. Pullar not known.	
George Pybus				South Australian 1878, 1879; Blanche 1880; Cumberoona 1881, 1883–1887; Saddler 1888–1890	Pybus was one of those stuck in the Darling during the 1885–1886 drought.	
William Richard Randell	2 May 1824	4 March 1911	Mary Ann; Ariel; Gemini; Bunyip; Bogan; Nil Desperandum; Corowa 1876	Mary Ann 1853–1855; Gemini 1855–1859; Bunyip 1858, 1859, 1861–1863; Bogan 1864–1869; Nil Desperandum 1870–1874; Corowa 1876	Built and skippered Mary Ann, proved a steamer could operate commercially on the Murray. With E. B. Scott (see below), as Randell & Scott, he had stores at Wentworth, Booligal and Hay (sold 1861 to Morgan & Pollard). He married Elizabeth Ann "Annie" Nickels (1835 – 16?17? October 1924) in 1853.	Randell
(Richard) Murray Randell	2 February 1863	6 March 1952	Tyro	Tyro 1897, 1899, 1904, 1909; Also most of Randell's line.	Captain Murray Randell, son of W. R. Randell, managed the fleet of paddle steamers on the Murray for 56 years and captained most if not all of them. He married Anne Florence "Florrie" McKirdy of Mannum in 1889, lived on houseboat Murrundie (previously P.S. Menindie) at Murray Bridge from 1912.	Randell
James Percy Randell	22 April 1867	4 January 1914	Agnes (part)	Waradgery 1907	"Jim" Randell, a son of W. R. Randell, married (Violet Sarah) Rose Bock.	Randell
Albert Wentworth Randell	18 September 1870	3 October 1923	Tyro	Federal	Another son of W. R. Randell, he skippered Federal for Renmark Irrigation Trust.	Randell
Thomas George Randell	c. 1826	14 May 1880			Assisted his brother W. R. Randell in his pioneering river voyages. He later managed a slipway at Mannum and a store on the Bogan river.(Mudie p. 200). His eldest daughter Mary Evelyn Randell (c. 1852 – 29 October 1927) married "Charlie" Bock (c. 1843 – 4 December 1919) in 1875.	Randell
Elliott Charles Randell	1832	29 April 1908	Bunyip; Gemini; Corowa	Bunyip 1859, 1860; Gemini; Pearl 1866–1872, 1875, 1876; Corowa 1873–1876, 1880; Gem 1877–1879; Princess Royal 1879; Ruby 1880; Success 1881, 1882,1886 (Mudie p. 109)	A brother of W. R. Randell, he lived at Hay, Echuca and Moama. He was declared insolvent in 1878 and forced to sell his farm.	Randell
Alfred Elliott Randell	c. 1856	21 January 1892		Ruby 1880, 1881; Corowa 1885, 1886; Waradgery 1890–1892	Son of E. C. Randell, he was stuck in Darling during 1885–1886 drought. He was declared insolvent 1881. He married Katherine W. Swaine on 25 January 1890. Their daughter was born three weeks after he died.	Randell
Ebenezer Hartly Randell	March 1838	6 September 1890		Gemini 1860; Bunyip 1859–1861; Moolgewanke 1863–1865, :1867, 1868, 1870, 1871, 1874; Pearl 1870, 1875; Corowa 1871; Riverina 1871–1873; Ariel 1880–1882; Roma 1884–1886	"Eb" Randell, a brother of W. R. Randell, was skipper of Roma 1886, when it was destroyed by fire. He married Ada Caroline Farmer in 1867.	Randell
Ernest Walter Randell				Endeavour; Undaunted	"Ern" Randell, identified as an American (Mudie p. 217) but may have been born in Mannum 4 May 1866, died 7 December 1940, married Florence Tupholme (c. 1865–1892) of Moama in 1890.	
Ernest R. Randell	c. 1878			Excelsior 1923, 1925; Wanera 1953	"Ernie", a son of Ernest W. Randell, also mentioned by Mudie (Mudie p. 217).	
Robert Thomas Frederick James Ransom	23 September 1862	15 April 1954		Wagga Wagga 1890; Princess Royal 1908; Alfred 1912, 1913, 1915; Marion 1916; Ruby c. 1916	Robert F. Ransom, of Mildura married Maude Mary Nichols (1 October 1874 – 6 June 1925) in 1893 and had eight children; they were divorced in 1917; Mrs.Barritt was cited as co-respondent.	
Robert Reed			Kelvin 1934; Ulonga 1937; Renmark 1948	Kelvin 1934, 1935; Ulonga 1937	"Bob" Reed R.N.R., of Renmark, later Goolwa, was skipper of Kelvin 1935 during the swamping of Renmark regatta. Purchased Ulonga 1937 to cart wood for Renmark Irrigation Trust. He married Winifred Maude "Win" Rolfe in 1930.	
R.T. Reid	1832	1915	Jane Eliza 1875–1879?		With brother W.L. Reid owners of Tolarno Station	
Reis				Beechworth 1866; Lady Darling 1866; Alfred 1867	He was at McLarty's Bringagee station when it was overrun by bushrangers. Perhaps C. E. Reis R.N.R. (c. 1835 – c. 15 September 1915).	
Rice				Barwon 1914; Wm. Davies 1920	He was skipper of the William Davies when her shaft broke, causing considerable damage but no injury.	
Edward Rich	c. 1844	c. 15 September 1912	List		Founder and managing director of E. Rich & Co.	Rich
George Henri Risby	c. 1840	29 January 1898	Struggler; Wagga Wagga; Alfred 1890		George Risby owned sawmills in Mildura and Narrandera. He left his first wife and family of four daughters and son George in 1884, to live with Sophie Myer, and with whom he had a further two children. He married Sophie on 17 January 1896, his first wife having died in 1892.	
James Ritchie sr.	1832	23 April 1881	Pioneer	Wakool 1863; Jolly Miller 1868	James Ritchie was a member of first Lady Augusta crew. He married Alison Johnstone (12 August 1829 – 19 February 1913) in 1854 in Cockenzie, later lived in Goolwa. Three sons (below) were captains of river boats.	Ritchie
James Ritchie jr.	25 November 1858		Pioneer (part) 1881–	Lady Augusta 1867; Providence 1868; Victoria 1870–1873; Burrabogie 1874–1877; Pioneer 1878–1780, 1882; Cadell 1923, 1925	Son of James Ritchie, "Jim" Ritchie married Wenfried Hennessy of Goolwa in 1866. Her sister Eliza married William Barber.	
John David Ritchie	5 August 1862	19 May 1942	Pioneer (part) 1881–	Jupiter 1892–1894, 1896, 1897; Cadell 1922 (Mudie p. 194)	"Jack" Ritchie, second son of James Ritchie sr., was mayor of Goolwa 1925, married Elisabeth Miriam Rogers ( – 20 December 1931) in 1892.	
George Ritchie	14 December 1864	7 August 1944	Pioneer (part) 1881– Pioneer 1891–1899; Alexandra; Bantam; Venus 1906–	Pioneer 1878–1882, :1890 (Mudie p. 88), 1891–1894; Alexandra 1904, 1906	Son of James Ritchie sr., George Ritchie M.H.A. was part-owner of Pioneer with brothers, then sole owner from 1891 to 1899.	Main article
David Johnstone Ritchie	c. 1874		Cadell 1923		Fourth son of James Ritchie sr. He was mayor of Goolwa 1922, councillor 1938, purchased Cadell 1923, and brought her back to the Murray. He married Violet Mayfield in 1903; lived at Goolwa, then Semaphore.	
J. W. Ritchie				Corrong 1874, 1876	Possibly same person as James Ritchie jr.	
River Murray Navigation Company	1853	1859	Lady Augusta; Melbourne; Albury; Gundagai; Grappler; Ruby; Bogan; Wakool		Formed 1853 by Francis Cadell and William Younghusband, it was liquidated 1859, after a series of mishaps and mismanagement. By 1896 the company existed in name only.	
River Darling Navigation Co.	1882	1905			Founded by Edward Quin M.P., A. Kirkpatrick, C. G. Lush, T. B. Chambers and others, to make the Darling navigable between Wentworth and Wilcannia by means of locks. The company failed in its objectives and folded around 1905.	
Edmund Robertson				Sir Henry Young 1854; Lady Augusta 1854, 1855, :1857–1859; Gundagai 1855; Albury 1855; Gundagai 1855; Melbourne 1856	Robertson commanded Eureka, tender to the Lady Augusta on her pioneering trip up the Murray in 1853.	
John Robson	12 February 1838	14 January 1910	Osprey 1882– Rothbury 1886		Banker of Ballarat; youngest brother of William (c. 1831 – 6 April 1891) and James Robson owners of Gunbower sawmills. He was well known as a musician, elocutionist and Shakespearean actor.	
George Henry Robson		2 January 1953		Barwon 1898, 1904, 1906; Hero 1905; Nile 1905		
George Vining Rogers	1832	11 July 1910		Milang 1893, 1894, 1900, 1902	Rogers captained sailing ships on Lower Lakes before steamer Milang.	
C. Rolfe				Rob Roy 1880; Enterprise 1882		
R. Ross				Albury 1856		
Sidney James Rossiter	c. 1884	27 August 1943		Mannum 1914; Corowa 1914; Marion 1914; Milang 1928	He was married to Caroline Sophie; lived at Murray Bridge.	
William Rowlands	c. 1830	15 March 1898		Kelpie 1876; Pride of the Murray 1877–1889; Trafalgar 1882	"Bill" Rowlands was an uncle of W. E. Davies.	
F. Salmon				Ferret 1892, 1896	Fred Salmon's brother Andrew. a deckhand, died in fire aboard Elfie while moored at Brewarrina 1892	
William Sandey	c. 1859	8 July 1896		Decoy 1892–1894	Lived at Murray Bridge	
Philip J. Sandford			Renmark	Barwon 1910; Wm. Randell 1911; Rob Roy 1912; Canally 1925	"Phil" Sandford was shipbuilder of Mannum for J. G. Arnold, who managed upgrades to Murrundi and Waikerie, and construction of Esmeralda; He later worked at Morgan, and converted the steamer Renmark for his own use as a houseboat. He later worked for the Roads and Bridges Department.	
Théophile Jules Saunier	1840	c. 15 June 1917		Express 1871, 1872; Eliza Jane 1876, 1879, 1880	"Steve" Saunier, originally from New Orleans, worked on Mundoo, Jupiter, Dispatch, Arcadia and Goolwa. and, as mate, commanded Jupiter 1874, 1875. He was captain of Eliza Jane 1879 when she collided with Queen and 1880 when she struck Jolly Miller. He married Agnes Smith in 1879; lived at Goolwa.	
Charles Schmedje sr.	c. 1846	27 November 1891		Thistle 1879; Adelaide 1879–1889; Little Wonder 1881, 1882	Schmedje, in 1883 appeared on an assault charge against a former crewman, for which he received the minimum penalty of one shilling. Born in Germany, he was married to Ann (c. 1854 – 6 October 1934).	
Charles Edward Harper Schmedje	1872	10 January 1949		Adelaide (but when?)	Son of Charles sr., he captained Adelaide, possibly from 1886 to 1889 when her skipper's name was reported as "Smidgee". He was married to Elizabeth Ann (c. 1854 – 6 October 1934). They farmed at Kotupna and many of the family settled at Tongala.	
Frederick Edward Schuetze (Schütze)	1847	1 January 1930	Golconda	Fairy; Golconda	A storekeeper of Mannum, who, with J. George Arnold, traded on the Murray. His daughter Cora Matilda married Percival Walter Randell, son of E. H. Randell, in 1907.	
Edward Bate Scott	1822	30 June 1909	Bunyip (part) 1860; Gemini (part) 1860	Lady Darling 1867	Noted SA pioneer, associate of Eyre (Mudie p. 200); Partner Randell & Scott 1860; passenger on Bunyip December 1863 when she was destroyed by fire and helped in rescue attempts. (Mudie p. 202) captain of the Lady Darling when she was destroyed by fire 1867.	Main article
Lewis Searles	1852	29 March 1934		Clara 1877, 1878; Tolarno 1880; Britannia 1888; Ruby 1890; Alfred 1890; Elfie 1894; Māori 1907, 1908	Married with at least two sons, he lived at Morgan and "Brighton's Bend" near Mildura.	
(William) Oscar Searles	c. 1892			Wm. Davies 1924; Renmark 1924–1927; Gem 1925–1928; Davis 1926; Ruby 1928	Born in Kapunda, a son of Lewis Searles, he is credited with at one time saving the Gem (captained by Nutchey) from sinking by patching her underwater.	
John Searles	10 October 1897			Wanera 1952, 1953	"Jack" Searles, born in Morgan, was a son of Lewis Searles	
A. Senior			Jandra (part) 1894–		Part owner, with W. & H. Brown, of Jandra, home "Woodlands", near Bourke.	
Rev. H. F. Severn				Etona (2)	Church of England minister, nephew of Bishop Kennion and Sir James Fergusson Later rector of Heathfield, Sussex	
Charles Mackay Seward	c. 1848	4 July 1899	Moira		Charles Seward of Echuca also owned barge Golconda	
Rowland John Shelley				Melbourne 1870, 1872	Shelley was in charge of snagging operations for the Victorian Public Works department, based in Echuca, from 1864. In 1877 he was charged with embezzling £400 of government money and convicted, but due to ill-health may not have served any sentence.	
Sheridan				Emu 1867, 1872	Perhaps John Sheridan who captained Emily for Sir James Fergusson, Governor of SA 1868–1873, later for Sir Thomas Elder.	
Samuel Shetliff sen.	c. 1815	27 February 1880	Tyro 1872–	Vesta 1868–1871; Tyro 1872–1878	"Sam" Shetliff married Ellen Rimmington or Remington (c. 1812 – 4 February 1882). Two sons were riverboat captains; daughter Amelia (6 March 1854 15 March 1920) married Capt. Andrew Willcock (1848– ) in 1885, lived in Goolwa.	
Samuel Shetliff jun.	c. 1847	c. May 1888		Ellen 1883–1886	Sam Shetliff jun. was sexton of Goolwa cemetery.	
Joseph Shetliff	c. 1848			Jolly Miller 1893–1895	He married Jane, daughter of G. F. Curson in 1874 and moved to Gawler.	
J. L. Simpson			Golconda (part) 1877–			
Duncan Sinclair	1852	30 November 1930		Undaunted 1877, 1881; Wagga Wagga 1878, 1879; Agnes 1878, 1880; Goldsbrough 1879; Golconda 1879? Kingfisher 1880; Rob Roy 1881; Ferret 1884; Lancashire Lass 1887, 1896–1898; Kelpie 1887; Enterprise 1892; Success 1892–1894, 1901; City of Oxford 1894	"Drunken Duncan" (Mudie p. 179) was born in Glasgow and came to Australia as a young boy, schooled in Echuca. After a time in the post office, he worked as riverboat captain before taking a clerical position with the Echuca Hospital. He lost a six-year-old son in a river accident in 1885.	
Rhoda Singh		8 February 1953	City of Oxford	Charlotte; City of Oxford 1909	Singh, a Sikh trader, possibly from the Punjab, built a general store at Loxton (the first substantial place of business in the town) in 1909. He owned the City of Oxford, from which he and Bhagwan Singh hawked goods between Morgan and Renmark. He sold the business to Polkinghorne, moved to Ramco in 1910, where he built the "Settlement Store" and bought the City of Oxford back again. He appears to have left the area after the sinking of the boat in 1911 and at some stage moved to Marree, where he died. He is reported as owning the Charlotte at some time after Henry Butler.	
William M. Sladden	c. 1883			Pyap 1908–1931	"Will" Sladden of Murray Bridge was a noted oarsman, stroke of the Murray Bridge rowing eight and was on the Australian team at the 1924 Olympic Games.	
Harold Sleigh	19 May 1867	24 April 1933	Emu and Ethel Jackson c. 1891–c. 1893		Based in Bourke, best known as founder of Golden Fleece petroleum company.	
George Sutherland Smith	1828	18 August 1903	Teviot 1865–1868; Beechworth; Jane Eliza (part); Lady Darling (part) 1867–	Jane Eliza 1867–1870	builder, shipowner and winemaker; partner in Smith & Harris (1863–1866). Smith & Banks (1857–), Upper Murray Navigation Line. He married Elizabeth Banks (c. 1835 – 27 August 1871), sister of John Banks, around 1865.	Main article
William Smith			Corowa 1868–	Emu 1871–1873	William "Anchor" Smith of Rutherglen was partner in Smith & Banks (Mudie p. 173); Perhaps the engineer William Smith of Wahgunyah who invented a machine for pulping grapes 1869.	Smith
James Anderson Smith				Teviot 1865–1869; Beechworth 1865–1867	Most likely a brother of G. S. Smith	
R. Smith				Tarella 1914		
Smith (unresolved)				Moira 1867; Ruby 1912, 1913; Mannum 1913, 1914; Marion 1913–1917; Tarella 1934		
John Smythe				Wentworth 1864–1867	In later years Smythe sailed between Goolwa and Port Adelaide, then in 1868 between Victor Harbor and Port Adelaide.	
Stevens				Rob Roy 1881		
William Stewart				Vesta 1873–1875; Blanche 1875–1877		
Charles Stilton				Gemini 1860		
William Stone				Kingfisher 1881, 1882		
Robert Strang	c. 1849	25 October 1905		Pearl 1882, 1883; Alert 1883–1899; Maggie 1904, 1905	He was unmarried and lived at Hare Street South, Echuca, with his mother and sisters.	
Leonard Johanneson Strom	1850	29 December 1936		Elizabeth 1883, 1885, 1886, 1888, 1892, 1893, 1899–1901, 1908; Enterprise 1894; Little Wonder 1898; Alert 1905	Married, lived at Echuca East. It is possible some of these should be ascribed to Louis Strom, reported in 1893 as a former river captain who struck gold at Coolgardie.	
William H. Sugden	c. 1844	26 May 1906	Kelpie (part)	Waradgery 1869; Kelpie 1875, 1876; Goldsbrough 1881; Edwards 1881	He was mate on the Wahgunyah when it was struck by Cumberoona.	
Alfred J. Sugden			Kelpie −1876 (part)		He was Riverina manager for McCulloch & Co., jailed for larceny 1881 (it could have been embezzlement but McCulloch would not press charges). A fire had been started in the Company office with accounts books open on desk, but this was not pursued.	
Alfred Charles Sunman		18 November 1880		Culgoa 1865–1871; Kennedy 1870–1876, :1878, 1880	Previously a salt-water captain with P&O, he drowned after falling from the Kennedy during a thunderstorm. He married Eliza Parkinson (c. 1845 – 4 September 1923) on 31 January 1869. They had five children, lived at Goolwa.	
(Samuel) Alfred Swannell	c. 1845	December 1875	Blanche (part); Gertrude (part)	Gertrude 1875	Partner in Swannell & Wallace, which owned mail steamers Blanche and Gertrude. He married Emma Chalklen ( – 30 January 1893) in 1871; they had two daughters.	
James Symington	c. 1828	29 March 1908	Kelpie	Kelpie 1864–1873; Resolute 1878, 1879; Agnes 1879; Bunyip 1880	He was for many years a resident of Beechworth. William Symington (1764–1831) was a notable Scottish steamboat pioneer. Family connection or coincidence?	
William Symington	c. 1830	20 August 1882			Also reported as a ship's captain.	
James Symington			Waradgery (part)		With Henry Leonard built the barge Only Son for Captain Davies. They founded a boiling down factory on the banks of the Murray in 1868, which in 1869 became the Echuca Meat Preserving Company. Leonard, Symington and (George) Dorward owned Waradgery.	
John Tait	c. 1844	23 September 1915	Corowa 1892–	Jupiter 1871, 1875, 1876; Princess Royal 1874, 1875; Dispatch 1877; Freetrader 1881; Albury 1881–1883; Ellen 1889; Pearl 1890, 1891; Corowa 1890–1895; Waradgery 1894	"Jack" Tait lived in Goolwa, later married to Agnes, and lived at Birkenhead, South Australia.	
Telegraph Line of Steamers			Waradgery 1868; Undaunted, Burrabogie, Riverina, Corrong, Golconda, Lancashire Lass, Kingfisher 1878; Enterprise, Wagga, Moira 1882		Agents: Permewan, Wright & Co. Ltd. of Echuca; Last advertisement 1900	
Les Telley	1891	1968		Coonawarra 1951 "The Melbourne" 1954 "The Invincible" c.1930s–40s "Adelaide" 1960	Les Telley qualified for his Master's ticket in 1914.	
Henrich Gottlieb Teschner				Corrong 1897, 1898; Colonel 1903–1906; Maggie 1905; Alert 1905, 1906; Resolute 1905; Barwon 1908	"Tesh" was for a time licencee of the Pastoral Hotel, Echuca. He was related to the Davies and Swanell families of Echuca. He married Mary Alice Johnson (died 26 September 1911), sister of J. G. Johnson, in 1903.	
Adolph Gustav Thamm	c. 1874	31 August 1924		Pyap c. 1900; Waikerie c. 1911; Corowa 1913; Tyro 1914; Wilcannia 1917; Renmark 1923, 1924	"G. A." Thamm of Morgan was married to Jane and had three daughters. He died of peritonitis following an appendix operation.	
Henry Theisz	c. October 1841	16 April 1887		Pioneer 1874, 1880; Corrong 1875–1879; Burrabogie 1878; Goldsbrough 1881; Maggie 1881–1883; Maude 1885–1887	He built the Maggie in partnership with Arnold J. King and Charles Roberts. Crashed into dinghy of Emily Jane in 1882, injuring one of the two boys, refused to give assistance. He was declared insolvent 1884 after an acrimonious split with partner Roberts. He fell overboard and drowned while in charge of Maude.	
John Thompson				Corowa 1870	Ian Mudie (op. cit. p. 174) says this was William Thompson	
William Thompson				Jane Eliza c. 1871 (Mudie op. cit. p. 224); Success 1889, 1890; Excelsior 1882, 1894–1897; Little Wonder 1898; Lancashire Lass 1906	Some or all of these may properly refer to William Thomson below.	
Thompson (unresolved)				Princess 1875; Rob Roy 1908; Wm. Randell 1912; Tarella 1914		
William Thomson	1859	20 January 1936		Waradgery 1879; Adelaide 1890–1911	"Skipper" Thomson ran Adelaide for 23 years, including in her later role with the Murray River Sawmills Co. of Moama, of which he was an employee c. 1885–1930. In his youth he was a noted oarsman. He married H. "Elizabeth" Maitland in 1894; they had nine children. Some or all of references to William Thompson (above) may properly belong here.	
Robert Thomson			Avoca 1877– (part); Brewarrina 1877– (part)		With Charles Oliver (as Oliver & Thomson) owned Avoca; Thomson and Ritchie owned Brewarrina	
Thomson (unresolved)				Alfred 1876; Success 1876, 1889; Pyap 1897		
Henry Thorpe				Wardell 1879–1884, 1888, 1892		
James Tinks	c. 1827	16 October 1889	Wilcannia	Telegraph 1866–1875; Corrong 1881; Wilcannia 1876, 1879–1889	"Jimmy" Tinks of Milang was mostly involved with sailing vessels such as the Mosquito, but later ran steamers. He married Katherine "Kate" Couly (c. 1837 – 19 September 1909) in 1862.	
William Tinks		1938	Canally 1919–1925	Wilcannia 1892; Ellen 1906, 1909; Corowa 1905, 1908; Ruby 1908, 1909; Marion 1910; Waikerie 1911–1926; Success 1922	"Bill" Tinks took over Wilcannia from his father and in partnership with Albert "Bert" Francis purchased Waikerie, Canally, Murrabit and Success. In 1926 he sold his interest in the Success, Waikerie and five barges, to W & W. F. Bailey. He married S. J. "Jinnie" Cowan in 1893, and moved to Morgan.	
Tonkin, Fuller & Martin	1868	1889			Owning stores at Callington, Wentworth, Cal Lal and Renmark, they were originally Tonkin & Fuller and for a time Tonkin, Fuller & Jones. At various times from 1868 they owned and operated Duke of Edinburgh (1868–), Moolgewanke, Nil Desperandum, Paringa (1877– ), Princess Royal (1881– ), Britannia (1884– ) and Victor. They were owners of Moolgewanke in 1874 when her boiler exploded with tragic results. John Raglan Frayne was one of their captains. Absalom Tonkin (c. 1839 – 16 June 1892) married Charlotte Fuller (c. 1836 – 18 November 1874) on 11 September 1855. For Benjamin Fuller and Andrew Martin see above.	
Frederick Toomer	c. 1844	6 September 1893		Lady Daly 1871–1876; Freetrader 1872, 1874; Waradgery 1874–1884; Princess 1878; Murrumbidgee 1883, 1884; Rothbury 1885–1889; Enterprise 1891	For some time partner with George Robson as Toomer and Robson, steamboat proprietors; dissolved 1891. He married Mary Jane ( – ), from 1883 proprietress of Steam Packet Hotel, Echuca, later held by a Miss Kenrick. He was publican of Odd Fellows Hotel 1885 at Echuca but declared insolvent 1886.	
W. Toomer				Princess 1879; Emily Jane 1879	possibly a son of Fred Toomer	
Toomer and Co.					Engineers of Echuca built engine for Dora 1884.	
H. M. Treacy				Sawmiller 1899–1901; Barwon 1924		
Daniel Ernest Treacy			Princess Royal / Monada; Avoca	Princess Royal / Monada 1937; Avoca 1939, 1948.	Renamed Princess Royal as Monada in 1926.	
P. Treleaven				Murrabit 1948		
Arthur Charles Trounson	c. 1866	11 August 1900			Engineer for R. M. Randell on Tyro when her boiler exploded November 1897, severely injuring both men. Assisted J. G. Arnold in his abortive removal of steamer Perseverance from Glenelg River 1898. Died at Mannum.	
Frederick Tucker				Nile 1888–1891, 1893; Pride of the Murray 1891–1901; Rothbury 1905	Fred Tucker was jailed in 1902 for embezzlement from his employers, Permewan, Wright & Co.	
William Thomas Tutcher		26 October 1895	Moira		Cordial maker of Echuca, later Sydney, then slightly dubious sharebroker of Melbourne	
Upper Murray Navigation Co.					Formed by Smith & Banks to run between Wahgunyah and Echuca	Smith
John Stephen Upton	c. 1833	20 November 1887	Endeavour 1876		Storekeeper of Milang 1872–1878, Wentworth agent for Whyte, Counsell & Co. 1880, mayor of Wentworth 1881–1882, president of Darling Navigation Association 1884. Married to Sarah Jane (c. 1830 – 8 November 1910)	
Benjamin Varcoe	c. 1828	8 October 1917		Wentworth 1866, 1867	"Ben" Varcoe married Harriett Brooks (c. 1837 – 31 December 1906) in 1857, later prominent flour miller of Hillston; Wentworth was built 1864 for Robert Varcoe at Goolwa.	
W. Varcoe				Wentworth 1867		
Wagga Wagga Steam Navigation Co.	1869	1878	J. H. P. 1869–1878; Victoria 1869–1878		Founded by James Warby; ran J. H. P. between Wagga Wagga and Hay; and Victoria and barge Pocahontas between Wagga Wagga and Echuca	
Leon Wagner				Coonawarra; Wanera1983		
Edward Walker			Warrego (part); Prince Alfred (part)	Prince Alfred 1867–1872	Partnership with George Oliver dissolved 1873.	
Jeffrey Wallace	c. 1844	23 October 1906	Blanche (part); Gertrude (part)	Bogan 1864; Blanche 1869–1875; Prince Alfred; Dispatch 1879, 1882, 1883, 1885; Bourke 1889; Victoria 1903	Partner Swannell & Wallace, owners of mail steamers Blanche and Gertrude operating in the Lower Lakes and Lower Murray; lived at Milang.	
John M. Wallace		12 February 1909	Alfred; Avoca; J. H. P. (part); Rob Roy; Victoria	Jupiter 1869; J.H.P. 1871; Albury 1875, 1877, 1878, 1880; Gertrude 1874–1876; Victoria 1894	Jack, brother of Jeffrey, served as cabin boy on Lady Augusta on her historic 1853 voyage. He was convicted of selling "sly grog" from the J.H.P. (part-owner with Dawson) in 1871. He killed himself a week after the suicide of his son David, who worked as engineer on the Victoria.	
Wallace (unresolved)				Riverina 1873; Ariel 1876; Mundoo 1876	Jim Wallace was third brother; all originally from Hindmarsh Island. (Mudie p. 167)	
(Frans) Oscar Wallin	1867	16 August 1934	Julia; Australien; Oscar / Oscar W. 1908–1909; Clyde 1909–	Julia 1898–1906; Australien 1905, 1906, 1908; Oscar / Oscar W. 1908; Clyde 1909	"Charlie" Wallin, born in Norrköping, Sweden, trained as a seaman and settled in Victoria in 1887, moved to Echuca in 1889 and was naturalised in 1897. He married Diana Blanche "Daisy" Waylen (1876–1959) of Echuca. Built Oscar 1908, exchanged her (as Oscar W.) for Clyde 1909. Their son Oscar William Wallin (c. July 1897 – 20 September 1917) served with the 8th Battalion, and was killed in action in Belgium. Their two-year-old daughter Vera died shortly after.	
James Edward Warby	7 May 1839	11 May 1910			Warby was a grazier of Billenbah station and businessman of Wagga Wagga, Hay, Hillston and Urana. Warby purchased the business of J. H. Pollard in February 1869, and founded Wagga Wagga Steam Navigation Co. to operate J. H. P. and Victoria. The company folded after a few years. He married Sarah Lakeman (c. 1848 – 28 January 1911); they had a large family.	
William Warren	c. 1831	10 July 1889		Amphibious 1876	Designed the novel twin screw steamer Amphibious and barge, built in Melbourne in 1876 for the shallow waters of the Murrumbidgee.	
Waters		May 1914		Jolly Miller 1871		
S. Watson				Mundoo 1912; Wilcannia 1921		
Frank Weaver				Canally 1924; Waikerie 1926; Murrabit c. 1930; W. F. B. 1933; Success 1935	Carting stone for locks c. 1930 (Mudie p. 183)	
William Webb			Moolgewanke (part)	lady Augusta 1854; Moolgewanke 1856–1859	Part owner of Moolgewanke with Robert D. Napier. He lived at Echuca until around 1861.	
John Webb	c. 1855	16 March 1934	Edwards	Pride of the Murray (Mudie p. 102); Edwards 1903, 1905	Son of William Webb, "Jack" Webb was a teacher in Echuca, then newsagent before qualifying as a riverboat captain.	
Weir				Enterprise 1879		
Peter Andreas Ammentorp Westergaard	28 December 1854	17 January 1919		Kingfisher 1882; Barwon 1887–1893; Goldsbrough 1883–1886; Nile 1891; Wm. Davies 1895–1902	Born in Odense, a son of shipwright (Frederick) William Westergaard, he was later Echuca manager of Permewan, Wright and Co. He married Janet Reid (1857–1939) lived at Echuca.	Westergaard
C. Westin				Florence Annie 1892, 1896; Mundoo 1897–1898,		
Weston				Wm Randell 1910		
George White			Bunyip	Bunyip 1886; Brewarrina 1890–1900; Wandering Jew 1903, 1908, 1910–1914	Various stories about "Nobby" White getting Bunyip stranded on Barwon during 1886 floods;(Mudie p. 93) and taking the Brewarrina 40 miles up the Moonie in the 1892 floods. He took Brewarrina up the Barwon to the Queensland border during the 1893 floods; the only vessel to visit all four riverine colonies.(Mudie p. 94)	
Edward Whitely			Lancashire Lass 1878		Sawmill proprietor of Echuca East to 1882	
John Whyte	c. 1826	16 February 1902	Decoy; Tolarno; Saddler; South Australian; Menindie		Partner in Whyte, Counsell & Co., wholesale grocers and shipowners, with James Counsell (see above) until 1884. He married the widow Louisa Heath, a sister of James Counsell, on 18 May 1854. In 1890 he was owner of Decoy, Tolarno, Saddler and South Australian, and at the time of his death he was the owner of Menindie and Saddler.	
Wilkes or Wilks				Emu 1874; Vesta 1877, 1879		
Rev. F. W. Wilkinson				Etona (2)	Church of England minister	
Andrew Willcock	c. 1848	14 July 1929	Tolarno		An engineer, he built steamer Tolarno, operated by his father and himself. married Amelia Shetliff (6 March 1854 – 15 March 1920), only daughter of Sam Shetliff, sen., and the first white girl born in Goolwa.	
Samuel H. Williams			Kingfisher 1877	Waradgery 1874; Freetrader 1874; Edwards 1875–1883; Lancashire Lass 1880, 1881; Emily Jane 1891	"Sam" Williams was ambiguously reported as owner also of Golconda and her barge Leviathan.	
H. Williams			Vesta 1879; Emu 1879		Possibly the same person as S. H. Williams.	
Williams				Grappler	At one time captained snagboat Grappler.	
R. F. Williamson			Golconda (part) 1877–			
Joseph Percy Willoughby				Timor 1890, 1891	Mildura dental surgeon, horticulturist and landowner	
Clarence James Wilson	27 January 1863	24 March 1905		Glimpse 1887–1888; Lancashire Lass 1888–1894	"Clarrie" Wilson, a son of James S. Wilson and brother of Bervin Robert Wilson (below) and Helen Jane Wilson (who married David Nutchey). He built the barge Impulse on the Murray river bank at Koondrook in 1885. He left Echuca for Western Australia in 1894 and died prospecting in Madagascar 1905.	
Bervin Robert Wilson	24 February 1856	8 November 1919	Glimpse 1886–1888; Lancashire Lass 1888–1896	Lancashire Lass 1894–1895	A brother of "Clarrie" Wilson, he built Glimpse on the Murray river bank at Koondrook in 1886. He was publican of the Bridge (previously Border) Hotel until 1901 and was twice mayor of Echuca. He was a popular contender in the "Skippers' Plate" bicycle race.	
William Wilson			Ferret (part) 1884– Waradgery (part) 1886; Australien 1897–1904; Rothbury 1899–1904	Ferret 1884–1888; Clyde 1888–1895; Julia 1894–1899	"Billy" "Cove" "Pirate" Wilson was a son of Richard Wilson, boatbuilder of Moama. He owned Ferret, Waradgery in partnership with Arthur Glew. He was one of the few to tackle the Edward/Wakool river system. (Mudie p. 77); He may be unrelated to the two brothers above.	
W. Wilson			Viola 1933			
S. R. Wilson				Moolgewanke 1871		
Wilhelm Adolf Ludwig Wolter	24 February 1842	4 September 1933	Pilot	Vesta 1869; Telegraph 1870; Pilot 1886–1901, 1916; Arcadia 1904–1917	"William" Wolter was born in Hamburg. He married Emma Isabella Steer (1848 – 2 January 1916) of Goolwa in 1871. They had three daughters and four sons, one of whom, Albert (1877 – 4 November 1893), drowned after falling from a barge. Another, Herbert James Wolter, was Auditor for Goolwa council; left town 1915. W.A.L. Wolter sold up in May 1917 and left Goolwa; he died at Victor Harbor.	
F. Wolter				Elfie 1897, 1898		
A. E. Workman				Colonel 1924, 1925		
C. L. Van Zuilicom					In 1854 proved the navigability of the River Goulburn between Seymour and Maidens Punt (now Moama), a factor in the rise in importance of Echuca as a hub of commerce. Cadell pointed out need for snag clearance.(Mudie p. 89)	

== Notes ==
1. Spelling : Information in this article has mostly been gleaned from newspaper reports. Barbour, Bower, Christie, Davies, Dickson, Hampson, Hansen, Johnston, Lindqvist, Maultby, Miers, Pickhills, Reed, Rossiter, Schmedje, Searles, Tait, Theisz, Westergaard (all prominent people) often appeared in print as Barber, Bowers, Christie, Davis, Dixon, Hampton, Hanson, Johnson, Lindquist, Maltby, Myers, Pickels, Reid, Rossitter (or Rosseter), Smidgee (or Schmedge), Searle, Tate, Theiz (or Theitz) and Westergard. The firm of Johnson and Davies was spelled four different ways in their own advertisements. Boats were given the same treatment. The barge Tongo was often written "Tonga" and Goldsbrough often "Goldsborough". Although the owners should have known better, the vessel generally named Lady Augusta was actually registered as Lady Agusta and Leichardt was presumably (mis)named for the explorer Ludwig Leichhardt (1813 – c. 1848). The barge Rabbie Burns appears to have metamorphosed into Robbie Burns around 1880. The steamer here spelled "Ferret" may have been registered "Ferrett" – more information is needed. The town now (and here) spelled Narrandera was once mostly "Narandera", a spelling tenaciously retained by its newspaper.

2. Dates of service alongside names of boats and their owners and captains are from contemporary newspaper reports, which varied greatly in depth of information supplied. They would therefore not necessarily reflect the vessel or person's full period of service. Dates refer to service on the Murray system; some craft and most skippers had earlier or later service elsewhere.

3. In the interests of simplicity, honorifics (S.S., P.S., M.V. etc.) have been omitted from boat names.

4. Ownership of vessels was not often reported in the press, which accounts for this column being largely incomplete. The major companies (Wm. McCulloch & Co., Cramsie, Bowden & Co., E. Rich & Co., etc.) as well as owning vessels, also acted as agents for private owners, who may have been their captains, or absentee investors.

5. Almost without exception, no master or vessel was employed on the river throughout the year. In non-drought years shipping activity might be expected to run (give or take a month) from around June (with the winter rains) to December (with the snow melt).

== Anderson ==
Charles Miller Anderson ( – 1 August 1942), came to Echuca from Stockholm in 1858 or 1859. He had been mate on the Morning Light and jumped ship at Melbourne to join the gold rush (Mudie p. 101). He married Margaret (c. 1831 – 28 February 1902) in 1863. They had two daughters and two sons and also raised nephew Hilary Hogg.

- Charles "Swan" "Swannie" Anderson (c. 1871 – 1 August 1942), whose knowledge of the river was legendary, spent fifty years on the Murray, first as a deckhand on the Kelpie, then for Permewan Wright as master of the Goldsbrough, Rothbury and Alert; then the Success and Alfred, owned by T.H. Freeman. (There are no newspaper reports of these to supply dates). Lastly he skippered the River Murray Sawmills' Adelaide from 1912 to 1939, when he retired. He was married to Catherine, who predeceased him.
- William John "Dollar" Anderson ( – 1 July 1949) worked on the Echuca wharf. His friend, bush poet Will Lawson, wrote a poem on his death.

Robert M. "Bob" Anderson (c. 1840 – 13 July 1889) of Mannum, possibly no relation, skippered Providence 1866–1867; Ariel 1868–1875; Nil Desperandum 1873; possibly Bogan 1868–1869 (Mudie p. 80). Married to Mary Elizabeth Anderson (c. 1841 – 20 November 1911).

- A daughter married a son of Capt. Donald McBeath.
- (Robert) Murray Anderson (c. 1869 – 15 December 1934) of Mannum and Mildura, with Sam Hoad purchased Wilcannia from William Tinks. He later owned Mildura sawmills.

He married Alice May Hooper (c. – 26 January 1915) in 1899, lived at "Edgecombe House", Mannum.

- Max Anderson, son of Murray Anderson, owned the Mildura slip, and skippered Rothbury 1948 (Mudie p. 103)

== Arnold ==
(Johann) George Arnold (c. 1863 – 25 May 1949) born in Gothenburg, Sweden, owner of Saddler 1894–, J. G. Arnold and Wilcannia 1911–, early worked on Golconda while Schuetze was her owner, may have become her owner and skipper to 1894; Saddler, Tyro and Renmark.(Mudie p. 133). He commissioned a number of vessels such as the huge barge Crowie (an aboriginal name for the brolga or "big 'un"). In 1913 the "Arnold Line" consisted of steamers Renmark, Wilcannia, Tyro, and Mundoo and barges Crowie, Gunbower, Loxton, Rosa and Duck. In 1898 he purchased the Perseverance but lost her while removing her through the Glenelg River mouth. For a time he owned Big Bend station and farmed for six years. He purchased W. R. Randell's shipbuilding yards at Mannum where during World War I he built over a dozen giant barges, which were employed in building the River Murray locks and many other boats, culminating in the Esmeralda. He grew wheat at Big Bend station then became one of the largest wheat traders on the river. He was partner with Mortimer Crane as M. C. Crane and Co. ( –1902). He married Alvena Pauline Riedel ( – 2 March 1934) in 1892; they lived at "Esmeralda", Mannum.

- Laurence Milo "Peter" Arnold (28 October 1910 – ) skippered Golconda; Avoca. He purchased Murrabit 1948 He was appointed director of Murray Shipping, Ltd. in 1948. He married Mavis Denton Oliver of Kensington Park around 1938.

== Barclay ==
James "Jimmy" Barclay ( – 29 May 1914) was a member of the first Lady Augusta crew. He accompanied the wives of George and Thomas Johnston, James Ritchie and John Barclay when they sailed from Scotland on the Planter in 1857. then the Burra, which brought them to Adelaide on 28 January 1858. He captained Albury 1870, 1871, 1874, 1875; Maranoa 1870–1875; Wentworth 1872. A brother-in-law of G. B. Johnston, he was married to Grace (c. 1835 – 12 October 1910); they had a son John Barclay (c. 1871 – 3 October 1921) and lived in Goolwa.

John Barclay (c. 1826 – 1 November 1886) of Mundoora, perhaps an older brother, skippered Gundagai 1857–1864. Partnership with James King as Barclay & King was dissolved in 1864. He was married to Margaret (c. 1827 – 5 March 1912), sister of G. B. Johnston; they lived at Mundoora.

- A son, James Barclay was partner with Thomas Wall as Wall & Barclay, storekeepers of Mundoora and Port Broughton in 1887.

Elizabeth Barclay (c. 1831 – 25 September 1920) married G. B. Johnston in 1852. She has been variously described as sister of John Barclay of Mundoora, sister in law of James Barclay and daughter of James Barclay of Cockenzie, Scotland. For all these statements to be true, Jimmy and John would have been brothers, sons of another James Barclay.

== Bowring ==
William Bowring J.P. (c. 1852 – 28 July 1924) was mayor of Wentworth 1896–1898, 1901. He married Eliza Williams ( – 6 December 1909) of Gol Gol in 1878. His business, W. Bowring & Co., store owners of Wentworth, later also Mildura, ran trading steamers Emily Jane (destroyed by fire on Christmas Day, 1889) and Prince Alfred. He bought barge Marion from estate of George Fowler; sold her to Ben Chaffey.

== Buzza ==
Thomas Buzza (c. 1833 – 25 April 1904) for some years owned sawmills at Back Creek (near Sandhurst), then Myers Flat (where payable gold was found in 1882), then the Wyuna Steam Sawmills near Koondrook and the Gannawarra Steam Sawmills. He built the Emily Jane (probably named for his wife) in 1875 (and skippered her 1877, 1880) and barge Goulburn in 1876. In 1882 he built White Swan and converted the Emily Jane to a log barge. but he continued to run a steamer Emily Jane, perhaps White Swan renamed, and was her skipper 1882 to 1887. In 1893 he sold up to run a business in Eaglehawk, but returned to Myers Flat in 1898.

== Byrnes ==
James Manning Byrnes (c. 1838 – 9 October 1924) was overseer of a snagging gang for ten years, including 1879–1880 while the river was low. and later ran a butchery at Wilcannia, and was a town alderman and mayor for several terms; his sons owned several pastoral properties including Tintinallogy. He and his wife Mary had a property "Surbiton" on the Darling and moved to Knightsbridge, Adelaide around 1920.

== Carlyon ==
William Symington "Billy" Carlyon (18 August 1859 – c. 5 September 1936) was an employee of Permewan Wright, initially as deckhand on the Kelpie then master of the Invincible 1886 (with Charles Hunt as deckhand), Barwon 1897, Elizabeth and finally the Wanera. He was one of the strikebreaking captains who together manned the Wm. Davies in May 1895. He kept the Criterion Hotel, Echuca, from 1897, and the Bridge Hotel, Moama, 1913. He married Mary Ellen Josephine Foley (c. 1872 – 5 October 1937); died at Brighton Road, St Kilda.

His sister Isabelle Halbert Carlyon ( – 25 January 1937) married Captain Gustav Lindqvist.

His sister Wilhelmina Carlyon (c. 1852 – 26 August 1915) married Captain John Innes.

His brother Thomas Symington Carlyon (1866 – 20 October 1925) was amateur champion oarsman of Victoria in 1896, kept the Criterion Hotel, Echuca, 1895–1897, then others in Ballarat, Creswick, Spencer Street, Melbourne, Hampton, Albert Park, Hotel Victoria, South Malbourne and finally the Esplanade Hotel, St Kilda. He is reported as having captained a River Murray steamer. He married Mary Ann (died 1920) Carlyon descendants were prominent in Melbourne business circles, including his second son Thomas Symington Carlyon Jnr.

Note: "W. J. Carlyon" was captain of Freetrader 1888 (though not aboard) when she sank irretrievably in 1914 and from around 1910 was licencee of the Bridge Hotel, Moama. This may be the same person identified as W. S. Carlyon above.

== Cramsie, Bowden and Co. ==
Merchants and steamboat owners, with branches at Echuca, Hay, Balranald, and Wilcannia. They purchased their Wilcannia store in 1877.

John Cramsie (c. 1831 – 18 February 1910) ran businesses in Balranald: Sparkes and Cramsie (−1860) with Thomas Harrison Sparkes then Cramsie, Bowden and Co. from 1876. He was M.L.A. for Balranald in the N.S.W. parliament 1880–1887. A son, William A. Cramsie maintained a correspondence with Captain James Dickson.

John Clark Bowden (c. 1845 – 7 April 1924) was partner for a time, then with his son ran a hardware business specialising in aluminium goods. He was, as "J. B. Clark" leader of a successful racehorse syndicate and was an outspoken critic of the Victoria Racing Club.

== Cremer ==
Edward Daniel Cremer (c. 1817 – c. 5 February 1892) of Goolwa "a most fearless seaman" skippered the cutters or schooners Unity 1866–1874 and Water Lily 1874–1876 but occasionally took on river steamers: Maranoa 1873; Enterprise 1877. He married Mary Driscoll (c. 1830 – 5 March 1900).

- Son Daniel "Dan" Cremer (c. 1835 – May 1942) of Milang, skippered Cato 1896, 1897; then mail steamer Jupiter for around 30 years, and was skipper 1928 when she was hit by a severe storm. According to his newspaper obituary, he also skippered Florence Annie. He married Margaret Sarah Jury ( –1918) of Milang in 1905.

== Curson ==
George Frederick Curson (c. 1822 – 1 April 1898) of Goolwa was partner in engineering firm Hooker & Curson, then manager, Goolwa Ironworks and Patent Slip. The steamer Cato was built for him and partner Joseph Nash (see below). George married Jane (c. 1827 – 5 February 1866), then Sarah (1827 – 22 January 1901), whose sister Eliza (c. 1840 – 2 August 1892) was married to Joseph Nash. His daughter Jane married Joseph, son of S. Shetliff, in 1874.

== Davies ==
William J. "Commodore" "Bill" Davies (c. 1830 – 15 April 1903), born in Liverpool, skipper and part-owner (as Johnson, Davies and Co. then Davies and Locke, finally Wm. Davies and Son) of Pride of the Murray 1865–1877 and Nile 1885– . He also skippered Kelpie, Trafalgar 1877. He was partner with George Dorward in the firm of Dorward and Davies c. (1875–1884). He married (1) Annie (c. 1831 – 8 July 1875) in 1856, and (2) Teresa (Tassie) Helena Smith in 1878. Tussle over W. J. Davies' will

- Their son William E. Davies (15 September 1859 – 23 October 1902), aka William Davies jr., skippered Pride of the Murray 1878–1884; Nile 1887. He married Elizabeth Jane (c. 1864 – 5 March 1927) They had a son William H. Davies.

== Dorward ==
George Johnston Dorward (c. 1831 – 9 March 1906) was born in Fifeshire and sailed to Melbourne as second mate on the Beemah in 1855. He accompanied Francis Cadell on his first voyage down the river from Albury, charting the river. He was on the Lady Darling when she first reached Echuca. He was on the Albury when it first reached the town of Albury. In the summer months he and Cadell were occupied in removing snags from the river. Lived at "Rosebank", Moama. He was a partner with William Davies in the firm Dorward & Davies (c. 1875–1884). He was later involved in wheat, sheep and cattle growing. He married Ann Haxton (c. 1832 – 24 August 1910) in Scotland before emigrating; they lived in Moama; he died in Toorak, leaving a considerable estate; his will was for a time contested by eldest son G. R. Dorward jun.

- His eldest son, George Roy Dorward jun. (1853–) born at Echuca, skippered Kelpie 1877–1878; Pearl 1879–1880; Rodney 1878–1884; Alert 1901; Excelsior 1916.

== Dowland ==
Thomas Dowland (c. 1833 – 27 March 1887) was a carpenter builder and undertaker who arrived in Australia in 1848 and resided in Goolwa from about 1860. He operated the steamer Express 1869–1870, which with her barge was sold to satisfy creditors after he was declared insolvent, and he returned to the building trade. He was married to Elizabeth (c. 1833 – 27 March 1887) and died at the Murray Bridge home of his daughter Milveena Woodard (1859–1935). He was mayor of Goolwa 1888. His son Frederick Archibald Dowland was mayor of Goolwa in 1898; left Goolwa for Fremantle mid-term, was later a warehouse manager in Singapore.

== Egge ==
John Egge "The White Chinaman" (Mudie p. 99) was originally Chinese, being born in Shanghai, and was picked up in Canton by Francis Cadell to work on his ship Queen of Sheba. He assumed a Scandinavian surname (which should be pronounced as two syllables) and settled in Australia in 1852, farming on Hindmarsh Island, and became a successful trader and shipowner stationed at Wentworth. Despite his long residence and marriage to a British subject he was subjected in 1877 to a poll tax (under South Australia's Chinese Regulation Bill). Despite popular outrage (hundreds contributed to pay his fines) and support from both of Adelaide's newspapers, this was never reimbursed. Another celebrated victim of a similar law, but in New South Wales, was Way Lee. John's son Edwin David "Ned" or "Ted" Egge (1869 – 4 June 1946) held a river captain's certificate and was later a barber and businessman in Renmark. E. D. Egge married Alice Maud (c. May 1870 – 26 October 1942).

== Foord ==
John Foord (c. 1820 – 15 February 1883) "The Emperor of Wahgunyah", owner of several flour mills, built the steamers Wahgunyah and Waradgery. He owned "Foord's Punt", which provided communication between Wahgunyah and Corowa on opposite sides of the Murray.

His son Fred Foord (c. 1840 – December 1878) skippered Wahgunyah 1866–1868; Waradgery 1868–1872; Lady Augusta 1870; then Jane Eliza 1872, but after several reverses, culminating in the Jane Eliza colliding with the Wahgunyah bridge, Fred ended up almost penniless and when he died was working as mate on the Victoria at Pooncarrie on the River Darling.

== Francis ==
Albert "Bert" Francis (16 August 1874 – 21 September 1913) was born at Gumeracha and on leaving school settled at Mannum, where he became a boat engineer. He built the steamer Alpha in 1898 and traded on the Upper Murray between Morgan and Renmark. In 1902 he settled at Waikerie, where he bought land for fruit-growing. He later built the trading steamers Royal and Waikerie (the latter of which he was part-owner with Captain William Tinks). He was a successful real-estate developer, largely responsible for the township of Waikerie. In 1896 he married Amelia Clara Bertha Strempel (1874–1972) of Mannum.

== Fuller ==
Benjamin Grove Fuller (1815 – 9 June 1902) was owner of Paringa and partner in the firm of Tonkin, Fuller & Martin. He married (1) Jane Assels (1810 – 11 December 1871) around 1844, with whom he had several children, including Benjamin Mark Fuller (1846–) and Charlotte (c. 1836 – 18 November 1874) who married Absalom Tonkin (see below) in 1855. (2) Elizabeth Ann Pearce (1850 – 3 April 1932) in 1874; they had six children. They lived at Swanport until around 1879, Milang until about 1885 then Morgan.

Benjamin Mark Fuller (1846 – 20 September 1912) captained Duke of Edinburgh 1868–1874, Vesta 1870, Moolgewanke 1874–1876, Waradgery 1878, Paringa 1883, Princess Royal 1891. He was captain and part owner (with Absalom Tonkin) of the Moolgewanke when her boiler burst, killing two men (for which he was held partly responsible), and a year later when her barge sank. He operated as a trader on the Murray with the Britannia and Paringa until 1891, when he opened a store, perhaps in Renmark or Morgan. Around 1895 he moved to Western Australia, where he worked for Millar's Jarrah and Timber Company. He married Mary Rowe Lean (1845 ) in 1865. Their daughter Laura married E. H. Golding of Gol Gol in 1892.

== Grundy ==
George Grundy (c. 1818 – 4 July 1902), originally from Cockenzie, Scotland, Scotland was member of crew of Murray in 1866 which sailed to Australia with Capt. Berry for George B. Johnston. He was father of:

- Robert "Bob" Grundy (c. 1846 – 19 May 1919) worked for Knox & Downs; skippered Tolarno and Menindie. He married Alice Dodd (c. 1863 – 11 August 1933) in 1883. He died on the Tolarno. Sons Alick (died 1946) and George worked for the Irrigation Department.
- John Grundy (1858 – 20 March 1946) skippered Blanche, Bourke, Tarella and Renmark. He later worked for the Irrigation Trust and skippered Kelvin and Milang. He was married to Mary and lived at Murray Bridge.
- George Grundy jun. (c. 1861 – 18 April 1940) (Mudie p. 156) of Goolwa skippered Brewarrina, Decoy, Murrumbidgee, Industry and Dispatch. He became, in 1922, South Australia's first lockmaster, at Blanchetown. He was married to Florence Ellen (c. 1864 – 3 July 1922).

== Heseltine ==
- Samuel Richard Heseltine (c. 1849 – 19 December 1920), a son of G. A. F. Heseltine of Gawler, captained Prince Alfred 1875 and the Menindie 1875, 1876, 1879 and Shannon 1880–1882, 1886 both of which he part owned. He was secretary of the Adelaide Racing Club from 1893, and died some months after being struck by a tramcar. He married Mary Jane Hillier (c. 1852 – 31 May 1933) around 1875.

- A son, also named Samuel Richard Heseltine (6 April 1878 – ), was a solicitor and barrister, a practitioner in the Supreme Court and was in 1904 captain of the North Adelaide Football Club. In 1927 he succeeded H. W. Varley in his father's old position as secretary of the A.R.C.

- Augustus Frederick "Gus" Heseltine (c. 1854 – 26 April 1879), fell from Menindie and was drowned near Overland Corner
- John Charles Heseltine (1858 – 1 December 1935), captain of Shannon 1880–1885 (when she was destroyed by fire), then a wine and spirit merchant, never married, died after his car collided with a tram.

== Hogg ==
Hilary Harding "Paddy" Hogg (18 July 1913 – ) born at St Kilda, was raised in Echuca by his aunt and uncle Capt. Charles Anderson. He had an engineering workshop in Echuca and was involved in petty crime in 1930, opened a timber mill 1938, then a radio and electrical shop. He gained dual qualifications as ship's engineer and riverboat captain; skippered Alexander Arbuthnot in 1942, then Hero, when he ran foul of the fisheries laws. He enlisted with the AIF as engineer with the 12th Small Ships Company, and was court-martialed on 25 June 1946. He sold up his electrical goods store early in 1948. Appointed master of Murrumbidgee 1947, he was captain of this vessel when his 6-week-old son Lawrence Hilary died 1948; the coroner could find no cause of death. A month later, on 29 November 1948, the Murrumbidgee burnt to the waterline while Hogg was skipper; his conduct during this emergency was praised. He was appointed first master of the Murrumbidgee II, soon after renamed Coonawarra. He was involved in the 1953 restoration of the paddle steamer Canberra. He was cited as co-respondent in the 1954 divorce of Neil Dryburgh Wallace and Pearl Royal Wallace (née Collins). He and his wife had four children: Beverley, Patricia, William and Mavis.

== Hunt ==
Charles Frederick "Charley" Hunt (1852 – 3 April 1941), was owner of Invincible (which he bought from McCulloch, and rebuilt 1889) 1887–1917 and her (or their) skipper 1887–1892. He bought the Freetrader wreck, salvaged her machinery and copper sheathing and left the hulk where she lay, but was later called on to clear away her derelict hull, thus losing on the speculation. In 1918 he retired to St Kilda. He was married to Agnes Mary (died 20 October 1947).

== Johnstone ==
Adam Johnstone was a member of Hew Cadell's Lady Emma crew from Cockenzie that brought the Gundagai and Albury in sections to Port Elliot and built them at Goolwa. Worked as mate on Menindie, Saddler and Shannon for S. Heseltine. Lived at "Woodlands", Murray Bridge, married Mary Ann Dalcam (c. May 1847 – 17 December 1932), and had five sons and seven daughters. Mary Ann married again, to John Thomas Medwell in 1911.

Mrs. A. L. Hawke (née Johnstone, born c. 1869, second daughter of Adam) identifies George Johnston (though spelled Johnstone) as Adam's cousin and Tom Johnstone [sic], owner of the Jolly Miller as his brother.

Thomas "Tom" Johnstone may or may not have been a significant figure on the Murray–Darling river trade; many references, on the balance of probabilities, properly refer to Thomas Johnston.

== Kay ==
Robert Kay was a mate on the brig Halifax (owned by Francis Cadell's father Hew), and skippered the paddle steamer Lioness, rigged as a schooner, from Liverpool to Melbourne, arriving in 1853. His crew was George Johnston, Thomas Johnston, John Barclay, John McDonald, William Barber, John Ritchie, all from Cockenzie. The Lioness, though intended for the Murray, was sold in Melbourne without reaching the river.

He captained the brig Lady Emma directly from the Clyde to Port Elliot arriving in 1855 carrying the Gundagai and Albury in sections. His crew included Adam Johnstone, George Johnston, Thomas Johnston, John Barclay and John McDonald. James Barclay accompanied the wives of these last four when they emigrated in the Planter arriving January 1858.

A. T. Saunders appears to give the crew of Lady Emma as: Robert Kay (master); Robert Ross (mate); George Gibson (engineer); Avery (cook); George Johnston, James Ritchie, John Barclay, and William Barber (crew).

== King ==
Hugh "Hughie" King (11 January 1840 – 7 October 1921) captained Ruby 1860; Lady Augusta 1861; Gundagai 1862–1865; Lady Darling 1864; Moira 1865–1869; Teviot 1868, 1870; Moira 1869; Jupiter 1869–1874; Princess Royal 1870–1873; J.H.P. 1872; Corowa 1897; Jane Eliza 1875, 1878; Gem 1890–1908.

He owned or part-owned the Teviot, Ellen, Moira 1865–, Princess Royal, Jupiter, Jane Eliza (with which he once towed three barges from Bourke), Gem (which he lengthened by 40 feet) J. H. P. 1872– and Ruby. The Gem Line, of which he was a principal, also ran the Corowa, Marion and the second Ruby. The partnership with George Chaffey as "H. King and Co." was taken over by Chaffey in 1897.

Rivalry between King with Gem and Cantwell with Trafalgar created considerable interest.

He married Isabel McKenzie (died 1888). They had four sons, two of whom outlived him. He married again, to Frances Judd on 26 August 1891 and retired to Morgan.

- Third son Hugh William King, lived at Nor' West Bend. He captained Corowa; Gem 1889; Ruby; Ellen 1905; Murrumbidgee 1909 and others.
- Youngest son Robert Alexander "Bob" King, lived at Morgan, married Jessie May Tapp in 1907.
- Charles King skippered Elizabeth 1879
- James King captained Gundagai 1864; Francis Cadell (which he owned) 1866; Jupiter and Ruby 1899 He was mentioned in "Letter to the Editor" 1870. In 1875, he sold up and fled to New Caledonia (Mudie, op. cit. p. 116). It is likely but not confirmed that these last two were sons of Hugh King.

Hugh King Drive, which runs alongside the River Murray at Mildura, may have been named for him, as was King's Row, a block of five houses in Morgan.

George King captained Pilot (which he owned) 1915–1917

M. King was proprietor of Globe Hotel, Crossenvale (1 km south of Echuca); he owned Riverina until 1887, when he sold her to David Bower.

Which King had Mannum 1901?

== Knox and Downs ==
Knox and Downs Ltd. took over Federal Stores, Wilcannia, in 1912. The company lost 500 tons of supplies valued at between £3000 and £4000 in a fire on barges Nonpareil and Cobar that same year, which may have prompted them to purchase steamer Alfred and barge Uranus. They were implicated, by failure to maintain Alfred properly, in the death of crewman Charles James Thorn in 1917 They opened a store at Menindee in 1920.

- Robert George Knox (1868 – 26 April 1948) was born in Belfast and came to Australia in 1886 arrived in Wilcannia in 1885 or 1886, where he worked for Keeble & Grainger. He opened his own office at White Cliffs, where he was involved in the development in the opal fields. He was a partner in Donaldson, Coburn & Knox (founded 1899 to take over Stone & Corney and the Wilcannia branch of E. Rich & Co.) then Knox & Downs in 1912. He was a director of Murray Shipping Ltd. He and his wife had a home in East Terrace, Kensington Gardens. Their daughter Maysie Warren Knox ( – 12 November 1947) married Railway Commissioner Robert Hall Chapman. Their son Robert George Knox jun. (23 August 1901 – ) was general manager of the firm.
- Lewis Downs (c. 1860 – 8 February 1843) left England for Australia c. 1880 with one functioning lung and arrived at Wilcannia in 1885, working as accountant, became manager of Donaldson Coburn & Knox's Wilcannia branch in 1909, then in private practice though remaining a director of the firm. He married Alexandria McKenzie Campbell (c. 1865 – 3 March 1942); had homes at Tallala Terrace and Darby Street, Fullarton. They had two sons, Philip (Phillip?) "Phil" Downs, who left for Sydney c. 1910 and Alexander William "Alec" Downs (c. July 1895 – 27 August 1938), who died prematurely as a result of World War I injuries.

== Kruse ==
Carl Heindrich Ferdinand Kruse (25 May 1823 – 27 June 1911) captained the schooner Ponkaree and later a three-masted schooner for T. R. Bowman, named "Ada and Clara" for Bowman's daughters, and used on Lake Albert. (It was later motorised and as a mail steamer operated between Milang, Narrung and Meningie. In 1939 it was renamed Showboat, based at Renmark.) He is reported as captain of Little Wonder 1880, but it is quite likely to be a typographical error for "Krause". subject of NLA photo mislabeled F. H. C. Kruse married Mary Rony (c. March 1830 – 21 May 1891)

- son Heinrich Christian Ferdinand "Henry" Kruse ( – 28 March 1935) worked as deckhand on Despatch. He married Kate Mathilda Miller of Swanport in 1886.
- daughter married H. Hoare
- daughter E. V. Burgess
- daughter J. Burgess

== Laing ==
Thomas Laing ( – ) was the youngest son of James Laing sen. He was skipper of Rob Roy 1876 and Agnes 1879 (also engineer and part-owner of Agnes 1877–1880 and barge Rabbie Burns from before 1877). He was accused in 1878 of tampering with steam safety valves. Thomas Laing and Company was taken over by principals James Randell and David Luttet in 1880. He found employment with Robinson Bros., implement makers of Melbourne. He invented a harvester which performed well in trials around 1888. He married (Alvina) Janet Wark (c. 1857 – 31 October 1884) around 1878; the marriage was unstable; they separated 1884 and she died in Melbourne the same year. He married Harriett Burke in 1885; she died four years later.

== Luth ==
Henry Luth (c. 1837 – c. 18 July 1883) was a sawmiller of Echuca; partner with Samuel Riddell as "Luth & Riddell" which took over the Phoenix Steam Sawmills in 1875, and soon dissolved amid recriminations; he continued as sole trader. He was owner of Moira 1875–

Luth was mayor of Echuca 1877–1878. He was married to Rose O'Neill Luth (c. 1840 – 16 June 1874). He married again, to Catherine "Kate" O'Hara (c. 1863 – 10 February 1889) in 1878. He drowned at Echuca after finalisation of his insolvency. He was insured for £1000, which was claimed by both his erstwhile creditors and the beneficiaries of his Will. The resulting court cases were complex and extensive. Luth Street, Echuca may be named for him.

== McCoy ==
Alexander McCoy (c. 1822 – 29 September 1895), originally from Portsmouth, was captain of sailing ship Gem, then captained steamers Leichardt 1856–1858 and her sister ship Sturt 1856–1858. He sailed the Leichardt to Batavia 1859, for use as river transport for troops at Bangor Massam, Borneo during the Banjarmasin War. He brought the Settler through the Murray mouth 1861, then captained the Maid of the Yarra in the Spencer Gulf. He was instrumental in founding the Adelaide Steamship Company.

Alexander McCoy married Margaret (c. 1826 – 8 July 1861). He married again, to Annie Sanderson, whose brother was Francis J. Sanderson of HM Customs, in 1862; they had a home in Alberton, then Molesworth Street, North Adelaide. He may have been a brother-in law of Captain Davidson.

== McCulloch and Co. ==
Founded by William McCulloch KCMG (22 October 1832 – 4 April 1909), Wm.McCulloch and Co., Pty. Ltd. of Melbourne, ran the largest transport business on the Murray system between the years 1876 and 1886. Among the vessels they owned or operated were steamers Alert, Burrabogie, Corrong, Ethel Jackson, Freetrader, Invincible, Lady Daly, Little Wonder, Murrumbidgee, Pioneer, Princess, Saddler and Victoria; and barges Advance, Alice, Berder Chief, Canally, Darling, Federation, Gwydir, Horace, Jessie, Namoi, Pelican, Pimpampa, Sarah Jane, Shamrock, Swallow and Willandra. They began divesting their Murray properties around 1885 to small operators such as John Egge and Charley Hunt. The business was taken over by Cramsie, Bowden and Co., which was in turn taken over by Permewan, Wright and Co.

== Matulick ==
Alexander Ferdinand "Fred" Matulick (July 1856 – 24 June 1937) was a boat builder and owner born in Port Elliot the son of a shipwright, worked in Goolwa, building steamers Napier 1874, Shannon 1877, Victor 1877 and Shamrock 1884 and barge Laurel; arrived in Renmark in 1887, where he built the wooden bridge across the creek at Renmark Ave. (completed around 1892) and as partner in Matulick and Oliver ran a stone quarry, then Morgan, where he built Pyap 1897 and Ruby 1908(?). He and brother Francis Joseph "Frank" Matulick (c. 1859 – 30 August 1939) built homes and offices: "Olivewood" for Charles Chaffey and residence for Colonel Morant. His firm A. F. Matulick and Co. became Matulick & Jones around 1910. He married Ann Harper of Meadows around 1878.

== Maultby ==
Joseph Touchstone Maultby (c. 1833 – 10 March 1915) was born in Ireland and came to Echuca from Canada, where he had worked on river steamers. In 1868 he opened a store in North Wagga Wagga, and began trading up and down the river in the steamer Enterprise in 1871, opening a store at Narrandera around the same time. He commissioned, owned and skippered Hero 1874–1890; then sold up to run a store in Yarrawonga. He died in a Melbourne private hospital; his wife Elizabeth died later the same day.

Frederick William Maultby (c. 1856 – 26 September 1932) captained Pearl in 1883. Possibly unrelated, though both originally from Ireland. He was a son of Henry Warner Maultby of Cork, and married Emma Warren Collings (c. 1862 – 30 November 1945) in 1885.

== Mennie ==
Henry Horn Mennie was a deep-water sailor from Devonshire who was captain of the schooner Josephine L'Oizeau (owned by the River Murray Navigation Company!), when she was wrecked at Port Elliot on 10 July 1856, but with no loss of life; Mennie and the harbour master Nation were highly praised for their conduct and Mennie was absolved of any blame. (The River Murray Navigation Company's new iron barge Goulburn, being towed by steamer Melbourne from Port Adelaide, was lost off Cape Jervis in the same storm with the loss of several lives.) He then captained the Murray steamer Gundagai for the 1856 season. He returned to the sea, in charge of the schooner James Gibson which was wrecked on an uncharted reef off the island of Rodriguez on 20 January 1858 on his way from Adelaide to Mauritius; again he was praised for his efforts and exonerated. He was granted the publican's licence for the Sportsman's Arms, Rockhampton in 1864.

== Mumby ==
George Humble Mumby married Eliza Mann on 12 October 1876. It is possible he was master of Alfred at some stage but evidence is lacking. His son (George) Michael Mumby (13 September 1880 – 22 February 1944) was master of Rob Roy 1913, and the Alfred May 1917 when she sank, killing crewman Charles James Thorn. He and mate Job Eastwood were charged with manslaughter but acquitted. A widower, he enlisted September 1917, served during World War I in the Tunnelling Corps of the Australian Army. He married again, to Frances Hooton (née Hooper) in 1919 and took up a farm at Curlwaa. He enlisted with the Citizens' Military Forces and served as a Private during World War II, during which service he accidentally drowned.

== Murray and Jackson ==
Proponents of stern-wheelers, these two Americans built the Settler 1861, Lady Daly 1862 and Lady Darling 1864 from selected Oregon pine. and ran an extensive shipping agency operating on the Murray, the east coast of Australia and to New Zealand. They later also owned Corowa, Culgoa and Francis Cadell. A. L. Blake was a close associate. Their partnership was dissolved in 1869.

Alexander Sinclair Murray (26 November 1827 – 26 November 1914) was born in Scotland and before coming to Australia was owner of the paddle steamer Washington, which plied on the Sacramento River, California. He skippered Settler 1861, 1862, and later ran excursion trips on the Hawkesbury River in his steamboat General Gordon.

Peleg Whitford Jackson (c. 1834 – 24 April 1912), born in Addison, Vermont, after coming to Australia was involved in the firms Victorian Coach Company, and the South Australian branch of Cobb & Co before his partnership with A. S. Murray. He skippered Settler 1862, 1863 and Lady Daly 1865. He was declared bankrupt 1870. He was at one time married to a Margaret Greig. He married Anna Chambers (9 December 1845 – 2 October 1907), daughter of pastoralist James Chambers in 1869. They lived variously in Albury, Charleville, Beechworth and Brighton and had six children.

== Murray Shipping Ltd. ==
A South Australian company with registered office in Steamship Buildings, Adelaide, and headquarters at Morgan, formed in June 1919 by combining the river interests (only) of Permewan Wright, and Gem Navigation Co., J. G. Arnold's fleet from Mannum, Knox and Downs from Wilcannia and A. H. Landseer. The fleet included the Invincible, Ulonga, Marion, Gem, Ada, Vega, Colonel, Oscar W., Pevensey and Australien, all of which were based in Echuca. F. O. Wallin joined the consortium in 1932. The company ceased trading in 1952 and was wound up in 1954.

== Payne ==
Frederick Payne (c. 1833 – 22 February 1911) came to Australia from England, lived in Echuca from around 1856 and from around 1859 worked as an auctioneer and commission agent. He was active there until 1882 (including a stint as mayor in 1866). He owned Resolute −1879, Invincible 1877–1879; Express 1878; Riverina, Undaunted, Lady of the Lake 1880– ; and Maude and the barge Confidence. He skippered Lady of the Lake 1884, 1887, 1896–1898. He married twice: to Marianne (or Mariane) Louise Boxall (c. 1839 – 8 October 1873) on 17 June 1862; then to Alice Boxall ( – ) on 24 December 1874. Two sons were involved in Murray trade:

- Charles William Frederick "Charlie" Payne (c. 1875 – ) born in Echuca, captained Elfie 1896; Pioneer for 11 years including the seasons 1897, 1898, 1903; Ellen c. 1910; Marion 1911, 1921–1931; Princess Royal 1911, 1912; Ruby 1925, 1931; Tarella?Tolarno? 1926; Renmark; Wilcannia; Tyro for J. G. Arnold's "Arnold Line"; Gem 1936; Merle 1946, 1947. He lived in Renmark. and is noted for his series of historic Murray photographs: No. 1 # No. 3 No. 4 No. 5 No. 6 No. 7 No. 8 No. 9 No. 10 No. 11
- Harry Payne (in adverts as "W. Payne") ( – ) of Mannum skippered Lady of the Lake 1896; Maude 1896–1898; Brewarrina 1904; Marion 1912;Tyro 1912; Renmark 1914; Ruby 1924; Pevensey in 1937, 1939; Gem 1939; Renmark 1940. He acted as Drage's mate on Marion 1938. He may have been the Capt. Payne on Cato 1908.

== Randell ==
William Beavis Randell, flour miller of Gumeracha married Mary Ann Elliott Beare (1799–1874) on 17 April 1823. Among their children were:

- William Richard Randell (2 May 1824 – 4 March 1911) with the Mary Ann (1853–1855) was the first to prove a steamer could operate commercially on the Murray. He owned Ariel; owned and skippered Gemini 1855–1859; Bunyip 1858, 1859, 1861–1863; Bogan 1864–1869; Nil Desperandum 1870–1874; Corowa 1876. With E. B. Scott (see below), as Randell & Scott, he had stores at Wentworth, Booligal and Hay (sold 1861 to Morgan & Pollard). He married Elizabeth Ann "Annie" Nickels (1835 – 16?17? October 1924) on 24 December 1853. Among their children were:

- William Beavis Randell (1 June 1856 – 19 September 1917), known as "Captain Randell", married Hannah Finlayson (1854–1928) in 1880. He was a famous motor-cyclist who held a world record in 1914.
- (Richard) Murray Randell (2 February 1863 – 6 March 1952) Also known as "Captain Randell", he managed the fleet of paddle steamers on the Murray for 56 years and captained most if not all of them, including Tyro (which he owned) 1904, 1909. Lived on houseboat Murrundie (previously P.S. Menindie) at Murray Bridge from 1912. He married Anne Florence "Florrie" McKirdy of Mannum on 3 July 1889.
- James Percy "Jim" Randell (22 April 1867 – 4 January 1914) with D. Luttet owned Agnes 1880–1887; captained Waradgery 1907. He married (Violet Sarah) Rose Bock.
- Albert Wentworth Randell (18 September 1870 – 3 October 1923) worked for Renmark Irrigation Trust, captained Federal; he owned steamer Tyro.

- Thomas George Randell (c. 1826 – 14 May 1880) married Mary Smith (c. 1828 – 16 April 1870). Assisted brother William in his pioneering river voyages. He later managed a slipway at Mannum and a store on the Bogan river.(Mudie p. 200)

- Eldest daughter Mary Evelyn Randell (c. 1852 – 29 October 1927) married Captain Charles Claus "Charlie" Bock (c. 1843 – 4 December 1919) on 10 February 1875.
- Ernest Walter Randell (1866–1940) buried at Mannum

- Elliott Charles Randell (1832 – 29 April 1908) skippered Bunyip (which he owned) 1859, 1860; Gemini (which he owned); Pearl 1866–1872, 1875, 1876; Corowa (which he owned) 1873–1876, 1880; Gem 1877–1879; Princess Royal 1879; Ruby 1880; Success 1881, 1882. Lived at Hay, Echuca and Moama. He was declared insolvent in 1878 and forced to sell his farm.

- Alfred Elliot Randell (c. 1856 – 21 January 1892) skippered Ruby 1880–1881; Corowa 1885–1886 (stuck in Darling during drought), Waradgery 1890–1892. He was declared insolvent 1881. He married Katherine W. Swaine on 25 January 1890. Their daughter was born three weeks after he died.

- Ebenezer Hartly "Eb" Randell (March 1838 – 6 September 1890) skippered Gemini 1860; Bunyip 1861; Moolgewanke 1863–1865, 1867, 1868, 1870, 1871, 1874; Pearl 1870, 1875; Corowa 1871, Ariel 1880–1882; Roma 1884–1886 (when it was destroyed by fire). He owned and skippered Riverina 1871–1873; Corowa 1871–. He married Ada Caroline Farmer on 25 December 1867.

Ernest W. "Ern" Randell, perhaps an American, (Mudie p. 217) skippered Endeavour, Undaunted, Wanera 1953

- His son Ernest R. Randell skipper of Excelsior 1923, 1925.

== Rich ==
Edward Rich (c. 1844 – c. 15 September 1912) was founder and managing director of E. Rich & Co, shipping agents of Brewarrina (founded 1872), then Bourke (c. 1887) and Wilcannia. They sold their fleet consisting of steamers Brewarrina, Cato, Excelsior, Lancashire Lass, Maude, Mundoo, Pilot and Rob Roy and the barges Albemarle, Alice, Border Chief, Emily, Rabbie Burns, Swan, Trader, and Victory to Permewan, Wright & Co. of Victoria in 1907.

Earlier vessels they owned or represented include steamers Elfie, Florence Annie, Lady of the Lake, Moira, Pioneer, Rothbury, and Victoria and barges Bantam, Cobar, Cutty Sark, Duck, Ferrett (sic in 1896 advt.), Golconda, Howlong, McIntyre, Paragon, Shamrock and Walgett. The company later became Hales Ltd.

== Ritchie ==
James Ritchie (1832 – 23 April 1881) of Goolwa was a member of first Lady Augusta crew. He owned Pioneer with J. H. Brown, then on his own. He skippered Jolly Miller 1868. He married Alison Johnstone (12 August 1829 – 20 February 1913). Three, perhaps four sons were captains of river boats:

- James "Jim" Ritchie ( – ) skippered Lady Augusta 1867; Providence 1868; Victoria 1871–1873; Burrabogie 1875–1877; Cadell 1923, 1925. He married Wenfried Hennessy of Goolwa in 1866. Her sister Eliza married William Barber.
- John David Ritchie ( – 19 May 1942) was mayor of Goolwa 1925. Skippered Jupiter 1892–1894, 1896–1897; possibly Cadell 1923, 1925. He married Elisabeth Miriam ( – 20 December 1931)
- George Ritchie (14 December 1864 – 7 August 1944) mayor and M.P., owner of Alexandra, Bantam and Venus; captained Pioneer 1878–1882, 1891–1894; Alexandra 1904, 1906. He married Charlotte Annie Knapman in 1899; later lived at "Port Seaton", Flinders St., Kent Town.
- David Johnstone Ritchie (c. 1874 – ) was mayor of Goolwa 1922, purchased Cadell 1923, and brought her back to the Murray. He married Violet Mayfield in 1903; lived at Semaphore.
- Margaret Annie Ritchie married Tom Goode (1846–1921) of Goolwa on 27 November 1901.

== Westergaard ==
(Frederick) William Westergaard (c. 1840 – 20 November 1923) was shipwright at Echuca with G. B. Air to 1884, then with David W. Milne. He left in 1886 and with his son James managed the dry dock at Mannum, then in 1902 moved to Fremantle. He was married to Ann.

- James Peter Westergaard (1870–1957) married Agnes Wilhelmina Busch (1872–1957)

Peter Andreas Ammentorp Westergaard (28 December 1854 – 17 January 1919), born in Odense, skippered Kingfisher 1882, Barwon 1887–1893, Goldsbrough 1884–1886, Nile 1891, Wm. Davies 1895–1902. He was later Echuca manager of Permewan, Wright and Co. He married Janet Reid (1857–1939) lived at Echuca.

- Helen married Ralph Bentinck Beere McCulloch (1887–1967).
- Lewen Westergaard of Echuca was engineer for Permewan, Wright & Co.

== Sources ==
- Mudie, Ian Riverboats, Sun Books, Melbourne 1965
