= Paringa =

Paringa may refer to:

== Australia ==
- District Council of Paringa, a former local government area in South Australia, now part of the Renmark Paringa Council
- Hundred of Paringa, a cadastral unit in South Australia
- Paringa, South Australia, a town and locality
- Paringa Bridge, a bridge across the Murray River in South Australia
- SS Paringa, a steam ship operated by the Adelaide Steamship Company

== New Zealand ==
- Lake Paringa, in New Zealand
- Paringa River, in New Zealand

== United States ==
- Paringa, California, a former town in Imperial County

== See also ==
- Baringa (disambiguation)
- Paringa Paddock, a section of the Murray River National Park, South Australia
- Pringá
