= Paringa railway station =

Former railway station in South Australia, Australia

Paringa

General information
- Location: Railway Terrace, Paringa, South Australia
- Operator: Australian National
- Line: Barmera line
- Platforms: 1
- Tracks: 1

Construction
- Structure type: Ground

Other information
- Status: Demolished

History
- Opened: 2 October 1913
- Closed: 1990

Services
Preceding station	Australian National Railways Commission	Following station
Wonuarra towards Adelaide	Barmera railway line	Renmark towards Barmera

Paringa railway station was located on the Barmera railway line. It served the town of Paringa, South Australia.

== History ==
Paringa railway station opened on 2 October 1913 as a short-lived terminus of the Brown's Well railway line the Murray Mallee. The intervention of World War I delayed the construction of the Paringa Railway Bridge to extend the railway to Renmark until 1927. It later was also extended to Barmera with the first passenger service running on 1 August 1928.

The line through Paringa was closed in 1990 and dismantled. The rail bridge still remains but now carries the Sturt Highway.
