= Renmark High School =

Secondary School in South Australia

Location
- Renmark, South Australia; Australia
- Coordinates: 34°10′21″S 140°44′28″E

Information
- Type: Government-funded co-educational comprehensive secondary day school
- Motto: Non Nobis Solum (Latin) (Not Ourselves Alone)
- School district: Riverland
- Educational authority: SA Department for Education
- Principal: Mat Evans
- Teaching staff: 38
- Years: 7–12
- Enrolment: 439 (2023)
- Campus type: Regional
- Colours: Navy blue and gold
- Website: renmarkhs.sa.edu.au

Renmark High School is a public, co-educational, comprehensive, secondary day school, located in the Riverland town of Renmark, South Australia. It is administered by the South Australian Department of Education, with an enrolment of 489 students and a teaching staff of 38, as of 2023. The school serves students from Year 7 to Year 12.

== History ==
=== Early Efforts to Establish a Secondary School (1918–1922) ===
At the request of local government officials, the Minister of Education at the time, W. Harvey, visited Renmark in 1918 to consider a proposal for establishing a secondary institution in the area, which was put forward by parliamentarians R. A. O'Connor and W. Angus. This led to a committee named the Renmark School Committee to begin frequently requesting either a high school in the area to be established or a qualified teacher that was able to conduct secondary classes at the local primary school.

=== Formation of Higher Primary Classes (1922–1923) ===
By 1922, a high school was not yet established, however, classes for secondary students were formed at the local primary school, these classes were called 'Higher Primary Classes'. Following this, another committee to establish a secondary school within the region was formed with Sidney John Dridan as chairman. This committee included representatives from both Renmark and the nearby town of Paringa.

At the time, the Education Department revealed that an average attendance of 40 students in the 'Higher Primary Classes' was needed for the Department to consider the establishment of a separate high school. With this said, in 1923, Dridian, the chairman of the committee, persuaded the Renmark Hotel Committee to grant £10 scholarships to the top ten achieving students on the entrance examinations to the higher primary class. This was to improve the average attendance of the class, which would allow for a secondary school to be established.

By 1924, there were not enough students in the area to enable a high school in Renmark to be built, however, it was reported that it was close. It was hoped that more parents would enroll their kids in the local primary school, which would justify a secondary institution within the region to be established. The school committee even urged parents who had students old enough for secondary education to send them to the Higher Primary School, instead of sending them out of the district in order to increase the classes average attendance.

=== Opening of the Secondary School (February 1925) ===
The school opened to students on 3 February 1925, with the official opening of the school taking place on 11 February 1925, even though a permanent building had not been built. Instead, the school operated out of a rented hall at the Renmark Showgrounds, with the construction of a new verandah and the installation of windows for use as a school. The school opened with 53 foundation students.

April 1925 saw the approval of a school council, which consisted of twelve members.

=== Funding for School Construction and Opening Ceremony (1926–1928) ===
December 1926 saw the government set aside £7,500 pounds for the construction of a high school building, as well as £680 pounds for the construction of a teacher's residence. During March 1928 the building plans of the school were available for inspection at the local police station. The proposal for the construction of the school was accepted in April 1928.

In May 1928, 15 June was chosen by the Minister of Education as the day of the laying of the foundation stone of the school. However, the opening ceremony of the school occurred on 6 July 1928, with the Minister of Education, Malcolm Mclntosh, laying the 'foundation stone' of the school.

4 March 1929 saw students have their first lesson in the newly built school, with 77 students attending. It was estimated that the official opening date would occur during April, when the school fair was to be conducted, however, it occurred in May.

=== Relocation to Thurk Street (1980) ===
The school was relocated from Ral Ral Avenue to Thurk Street in 1980. On 3 April 1980, the new school building was officially opened.

=== School Stabbing (2018) ===
In July 2018, a 19-year-old, who suffered from undiagnosed schizophrenia, stabbed another student during a school altercation, leading to an arrest and subsequent psychiatric treatment where she was found not guilty of serious harm due to mental incompetence.

=== General News (2022 - now) ===
In 2022, a new program named 'Ngarrindjeri language and culture' was introduced and was well received within the school community.

In November 2022 a boy had sent in a Bomb Threat to the Riverland School. Staff evacuated students and police had investigated the site, which there was no bomb identified. The suspect, a 14 year old boy was arrested at his home and was put into questioning with police. After the school was deemed safe, the students returned to their classrooms and proceeded with the day as normal.

In April 2024, a controversial presentation at the school discussed LGBT topics and incorrectly suggested that individuals who practice bestiality are part of the LGBT community, prompting outrage from students and parents, resulting in the presenter's ban from government schools in South Australia.

== Demographics ==
In 2023, the school had a student enrollment of 489 with 38 teachers (36 full-time equivalent) and 21 non-teaching staff (17.9 full-time equivalent). Female enrollments consisted of 245 students and Male enrollments consisted of 244 students; Indigenous enrollments accounted for a total of 10% and 12% of students had a language background other than English.

== See also ==
- List of Schools in South Australia
