= Mundic Creek, South Australia =

Mundic Creek South Australia
- Coordinates: 34°12′40″S 140°47′07″E
- Population: 30 (SAL 2021)
- Established: 16 March 2000
- Postcode(s): 5340
- Elevation: 15 m (49 ft)
- Time zone: ACST (UTC+9:30)
  - Summer (DST): ACST (UTC+10:30)
- Location: 217 km (135 mi) north-east of Adelaide; 6 km (4 mi) south-east of Renmark; 3 km (2 mi) north of Paringa
- LGA(s): Renmark Paringa Council
- Region: Murray and Mallee
- County: Alfred
- State electorate(s): Chaffey
- Federal division(s): Barker
Mean max temp	Mean min temp	Annual rainfall
25.0 °C; 77 °F	9.7 °C; 49 °F	242.5 mm 9.5 in
Suburbs around Mundic Creek:
Paringa	Paringa	Wonuarra
Crescent	Mundic Creek	Wonuarra
Crescent	Pike River	Wonuarra
- Footnotes: Locations; Adjoining localities

Mundic Creek is a locality in the Australian state of South Australia located in the Riverland in the state's east on the southern side of the Murray River about 217 kilometres (135 mi) north-east of the state capital of Adelaide, and about 6 kilometres (3.7 mi) south-east of the municipal seat of Renmark.

Its name and boundaries were created on 16 October 2000. The name is derived from Mundic Creek, a stream which enters the Murray River from within the locality.

Mundic Creek extends from the Murray River channel in the west to the Sturt Highway on higher ground in the east over a floodplain known in one source as the Pike River Basin and in another as the Pike Floodplain and which it shares with the localities of Paringa in the north and Pike River in the south. Most of the floodplain located in what is now the locality was flooded by the 1956 Murray River flood and those parts existing as permanent water bodies are part of the nationally important wetland known as the Pike-Mundic Wetland Complex.

Land use within Mundic Creek and adjoining localities consists of ‘primary production’ activities such as agriculture, fishing, irrigation and sand mining, recreation activities concerned with watercraft, fishing and hunting, residential use, and nature conservation as represented by the Pike River Conservation Park. Land in the majority of the locality is either zoned as the ‘River Murray Flood Zone’ or the ‘River Murray Fringe Zone’ which makes it subject to statutory control for the purposes of “conservation and improvement of water quality” as per the River Murray Act 2003.

Mundic Creek is located within the federal division of Barker, the state electoral district of Chaffey and the local government area of the Renmark Paringa Council.
