= Pike River =

Pike River may refer to:

== Places ==
- Pike River, South Australia, a locality in the Renmark Paringa Council
- Pike River Conservation Park, a protected area in South Australia
- Pike River, Quebec, Canada, a municipality (formerly known as Saint-Pierre-de-Véronne-à-Pike-River)
- Pike River, Wisconsin, United States, an unincorporated community

== Rivers ==
=== Australia ===
- Pike River (South Australia)

=== Canada ===
- Pike River (British Columbia), see list of rivers of British Columbia
- Pike River (Quebec), see Lake Carmi

=== United States ===
- Pike River (Michigan)
- Pike River (Minnesota)
- Pike River (Menominee River tributary), in Wisconsin

== Other uses ==
- Pike River Mine, New Zealand
  - Pike River Coal
  - Pike River Mine disaster of November 2010
  - Pike River (film), a 2025 New Zealand film directed by Robert Sarkies
