= Pike River, South Australia =

Pike River South Australia
- Coordinates: 34°15′41″S 140°47′18″E
- Population: 52 (SAL 2021)
- Established: 16 March 2000
- Postcode(s): 5340
- Elevation: 15 m (49 ft)(floodplain)
- Time zone: ACST (UTC+9:30)
  - Summer (DST): ACST (UTC+10:30)
- Location: 210 km (130 mi) north-east of Adelaide; 9 km (6 mi) south-east of Renmark
- LGA(s): Renmark Paringa Council
- Region: Murray and Mallee
- County: Alfred
- State electorate(s): Chaffey
- Federal division(s): Barker
Mean max temp	Mean min temp	Annual rainfall
25.0 °C; 77 °F	9.7 °C; 49 °F	242.5 mm 9.5 in
Suburbs around Pike River:
Crescent	Crescent; Mundic Creek	Mundic Creek
Crescent; Renmark South; Old Calperum; Lyrup; Bugle Hut	Pike River	Mundic Creek; Wonauarra; Yamba
Booknurpong	Yamba; Bugle Hut	Yamba
- Footnotes: Locations; Adjoining localities

Pike River is a locality in the Australian state of South Australia located in the Riverland in the state’s east on the southern side of the Murray River about 210 kilometres (130 mi) north-east of the state capital of Adelaide and about 9 kilometres (5.6 mi) south-east of the municipal seat of Renmark.

Its name and boundaries were created on 16 October 2000. The name is derived from Pike River, a stream which enters the Murray River from within the locality and which forms part of its southern boundary.

Pike River extends from the centre of the Murray River channel in the north-west to higher ground both in the south and in the east over a floodplain known in one source as the Pike River Basin and in another as the Pike Floodplain and which it shares with the localities of Mundic Creek and Paringa in the north. Most of the floodplain located in what is now the locality was flooded by the 1956 Murray River flood and those parts existing as permanent water bodies are part of the nationally important wetland known as the Pike-Mundic Wetland Complex. Stanitzki Road (also known as the Loxton-Paringa Road) passes through the locality connecting it to both the Sturt Highway in the east and to the town of Loxton in the south-west as well as forming part of its western boundary.

Land use within Pike River consists of ‘primary production’ activities such as agriculture, fishing and sand mining, recreation activities concerned with watercraft, fishing and hunting, some residential use and irrigation. Land to the south of Stanitzki Road which is located on higher ground is zoned for ‘Primary Production’. Land to the north of Stanitzki Road which is located on the floodplain is either zoned as the ‘River Murray Flood Zone’ or the ‘River Murray Fringe Zone’ and is subject to statutory control for the purposes of “conservation and improvement of water quality” as per the requirements of the River Murray Act 2003.

Pike River is located within the federal division of Barker, the state electoral district of Chaffey and the local government area of the Renmark Paringa Council.
