= Lyrup, South Australia =

Lyrup
- Town
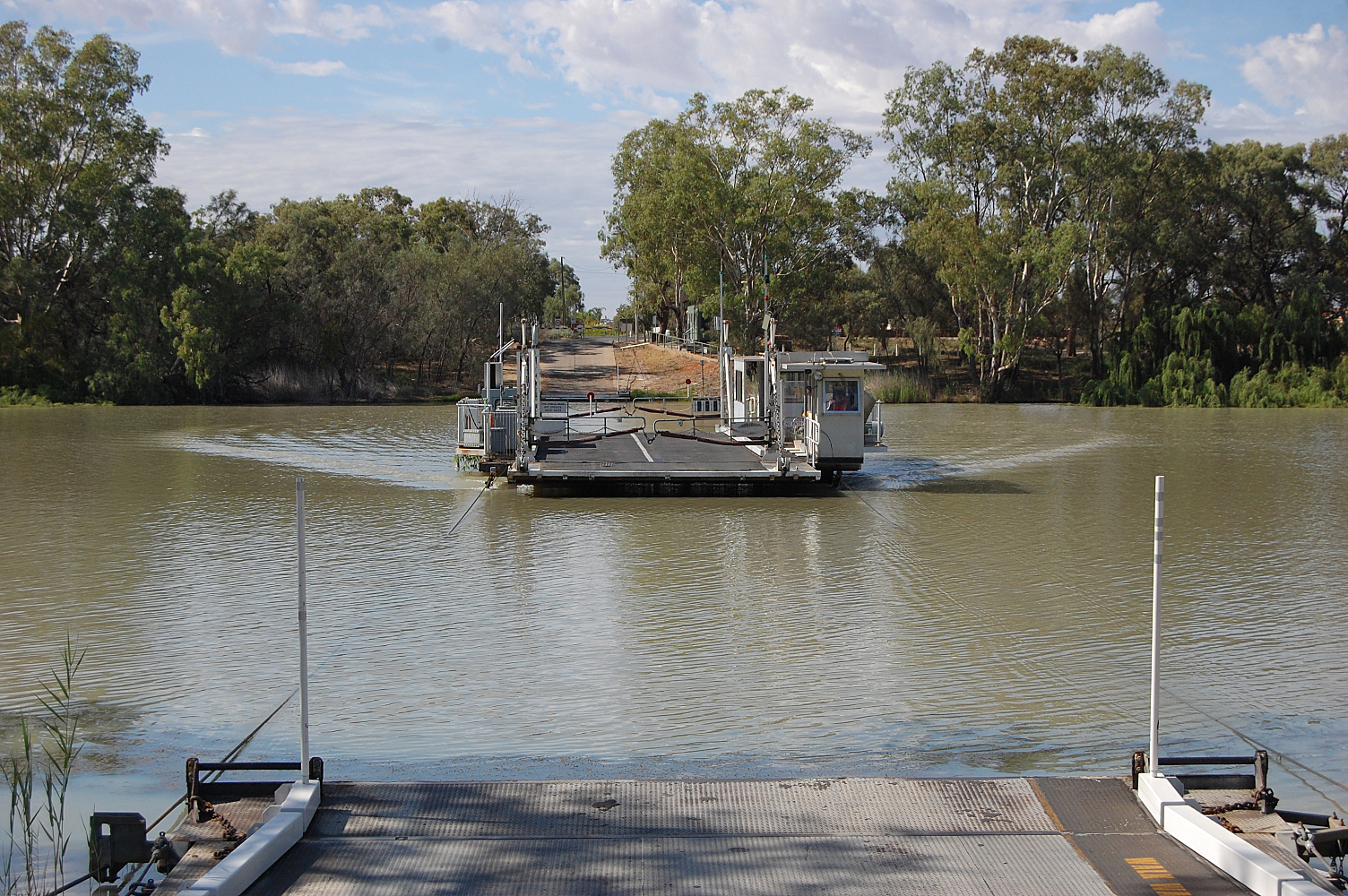
- Lyrup Ferry

- Coordinates: 34°10′S 140°44′E
- Country: Australia
- State: South Australia
- LGA: Renmark Paringa Council
- Established: 1894

Government
  - State electorate: Chaffey
  - Federal division: Barker

Population
  - Total: 346 (SAL 2021)
- Time zone: UTC+9:30 (ACST)
  - Summer (DST): UTC+10:30 (ACDT)
- Postcode: 5343
Localities around Lyrup
Monash		Old Calperum
Berri	Lyrup	Pike River
	Gurra Gurra

Lyrup is a town in South Australia's rural Riverland area. Lyrup is located on the banks of the Murray River. It is 267 kilometres north-east of Adelaide, the capital of the state of South Australia and 25 kilometres from Renmark.

Lyrup is accessible by ferry. It was established in 1894 by the South Australian government as a part of the creation of a communal land system (one of twelve settlements). 243 people originally settled in Lyrup. The town was gazetted on 24 September 1896 and was named after "Lyrup's Hut", a boundary rider's shack.

Lyrup still maintains a communal land system. It has a community club and picnic areas. The area around it produces grapes, stone fruit, citrus, almonds, apricots and some corn.

== See also ==
- Murray River Crossings

== External links and references ==
- Murray River Towns – Lyrup
- Tidy Towns Report – Lyrup
- Travelmate – Lyrup

Next crossing upstream	Murray River	Next crossing downstream
Paringa Bridge	Lyrup ferry	Berri Bridge
