= Big Orange (South Australia) =

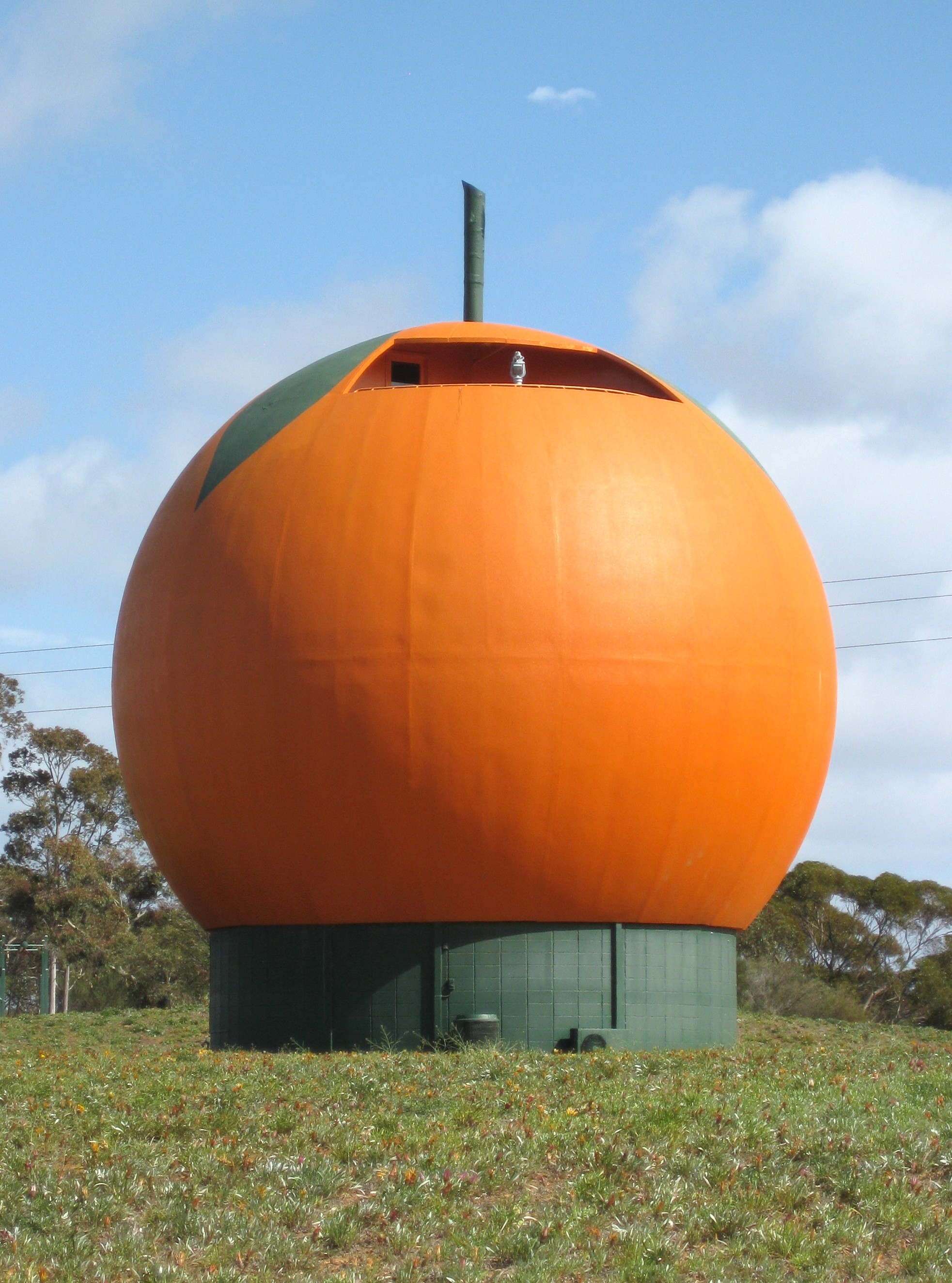
- The Big Orange in 2008

General information
- Type: Big thing
- Architectural style: Novelty
- Location: Berri, South Australia
- Coordinates: 34°14′47″S 140°37′15.1″E
- Construction started: 14 January 1980
- Cost: A$145,000
- Client: Bronte Coombe, Ven Chubb and David Marshall

Height
- Height: 15 metres (49 ft)

Dimensions
- Diameter: 12 metres (39 ft)
- Weight: 15 tonnes (15 long tons; 17 short tons)

Technical details
- Structural system: Fiberglass panels over steel frame
- Floor count: Four

Design and construction
- Architect: John Twopenny
- Main contractor: Hoffmann Engineering

The Big Orange is one of a number of Big Things to be found in Australia and is located near the Riverland town of Berri in South Australia. Standing at 15 metres in height, with a diameter of 12 metres (39 ft), it is the biggest of the "big fruit" in Australia, and formerly incorporated a cafe, souvenir shop, function room, lookout and a 360 degree mural within the structure. Opened in 1980, in its later years the landmark has struggled to find commercial success; after changing hands in 2002, 2006 and again in 2008, it has remained closed since 2004 and abandoned since 2012. Nevertheless, it has been described as the "most defining icon of the region".

== History ==
The Big Orange was conceived by Bronte Coombe, Vern Chubb and David Marshall. The three invested $145,000 into the venture in the mid-1970s, and the Big Orange opened on 14 January 1980. At the time it was claimed to be the "largest sphere in the southern hemisphere", and Bronte Combe is quoted as stating that it was the only big thing at the time that had a business conducted from within it.

In 2002 the Big Orange was sold for between $100,000 and $120,000 to RivSkills, an employment and training agency. They operated the attraction as an Enterprise Learning Centre, but two years later the Big Orange was forced to close, with the owners citing "financial losses and management issues" as contributing factors.

Two years after it closed, in 2006 the Big Orange was purchased by Kevin Dickerson. The Cooltong-based horticulturist planned to expand the property, but a combination of rising fuel prices and the drought saw problems emerge with the business, to the point where the Big Orange was no longer "a viable part of his business plan". The site ended up in the hands of liquidators, and on 29 October 2008 the site was due to go to auction. Options for potential buyers provided by the liquidator include buying the Big Orange, the land, and the water entitlement separately, and it was suggested the buyers might consider rejuvenating the landmark by turning it into a "big golf ball with sponsors' names painted on it". Although the October auction was unsuccessful, with the Big Orange failing to attract any bids, the site was subsequently sold in November 2008 to local businessman Frank Vallelonga, who planned to once again open it to the public. However in June 2012, Vallelonga admitted that his plans to reopen the site as a small theme park had come to an end after his application for a state government grant had been rejected, and no further development has occurred.

In the late 2010s, there were local initiatives to revive the site – including a tongue-in-cheek proposal to turn it in a strip club – but these were unsuccessful.

In 2023, plans were submitted proposing to redevelop the site with a brewery, distillery, bar and restaurant.

== Design and construction ==
The Big Orange was designed by John Twopenny, an Adelaide based architect and constructed by Hoffmann Engineering. It stands at 15 metres (49 ft) in height, and has a 12-metre (39 ft) diameter, making it the largest of the big things in Australia based upon fruit. It is constructed of fibreglass panels surrounded a steel frame, and weighs in the vicinity of 85 tonnes (95 short tons).

A footbridge is used to access the main structure, within which can be found four levels. As of 2004, the first contained a function room, the second a combination souvenir shop and café, while the third level possessed a 360-degree mural depicting the local scenery. The fourth floor has a lookout providing a view of the surrounding orchards.
