= Wonuarra =

- Coordinates: 34.216°S 140.880°E
- Country: Australia
- State: South Australia
- LGA: Renmark Paringa Council
- Location: 10 km (6.2 mi) south of Paringa

Government
  - State electorate: Chaffey
  - Federal division: Barker

Population
  - Total: 44 (SAL 2021)
- Postcode: 5340
Localities around Wonuarra
Paringa	Murtho	Lindsay Point, Victoria
Mundic Creek	Wonuarra	Murray-Sunset, Victoria
Pike River	Yamba	Murray-Sunset, Victoria

Wonuarra is a locality south-east of Paringa at the eastern end of the South Australian Riverland region. It lies east of the Sturt Highway between Paringa and Yamba, extending from the highway to the Victorian state border.

Wonuarra was on the former Barmera railway line of the South Australian Railways; the Wonuarra siding was the first siding south of Paringa, from where the main commodity dispatched was bagged wheat. The siding was originally named Koora, but renamed to Wonuarra because the original name was easily confused with Noora, further south.

In the 1960s, a branch line was built from the main line near Wonuarra to support construction of the proposed Chowilla Dam. (Note: At 34°12′07″S 140°50′20″E) It was 27.3 kilometres (17.0 mi) long, and went north-east to Murtho to the south bank of the River Murray. The dam was never built, after the South Australian government negotiated a guaranteed supply of water from the Dartmouth Dam. The railway line was removed without being used.
