= Berri, South Australia =

Berri
- Town
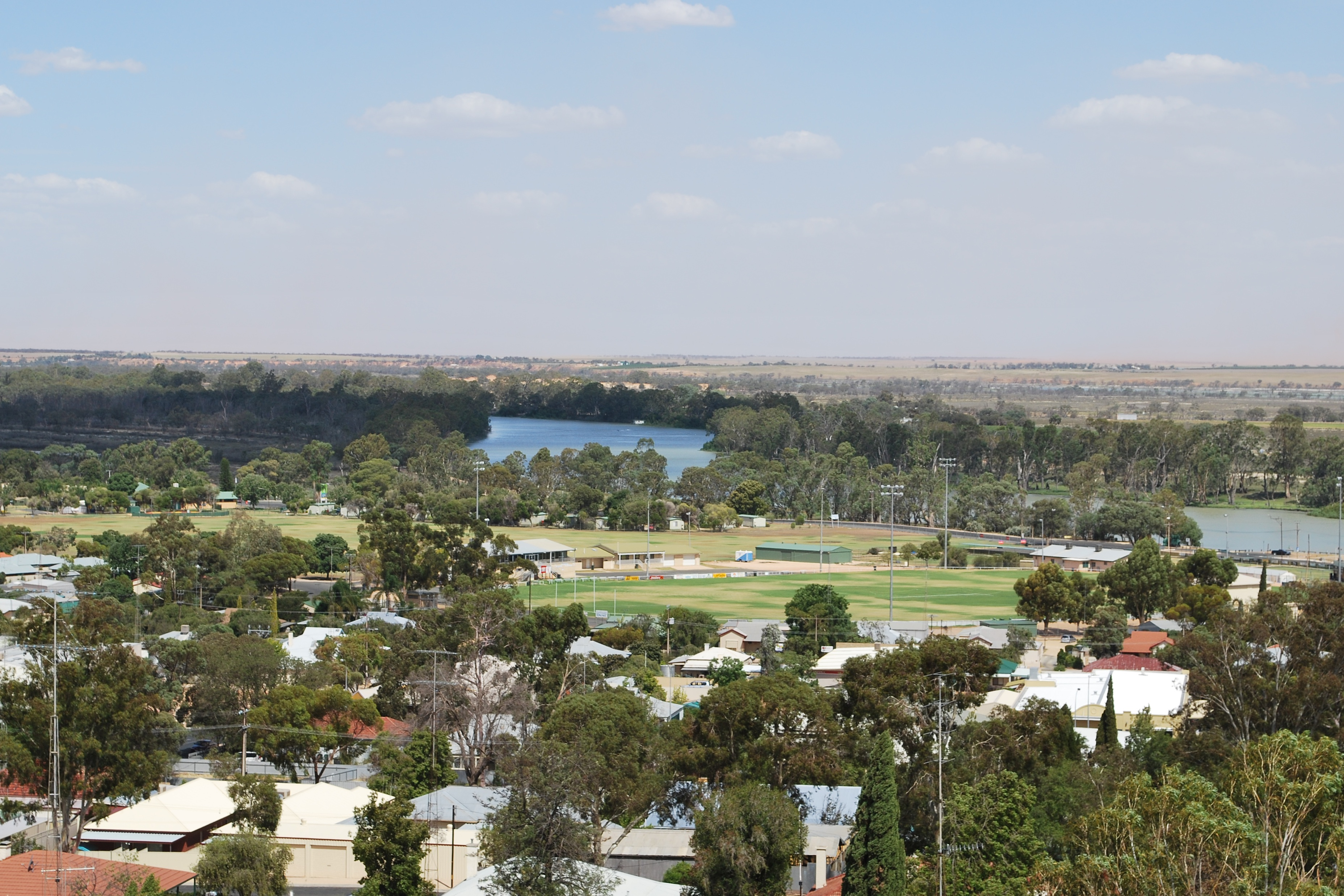
- Looking over Berri and the Murray River from the scenic lookout

- Coordinates: 34°17′S 140°36′E
- Country: Australia
- State: South Australia
- LGA: Berri Barmera Council
- Location: 238 km (148 mi) from Adelaide
- Established: 1911

Government
  - State electorate: Chaffey
  - Federal division: Barker
- Elevation: 31 m (102 ft)

Population
  - Total: 4,143 (SAL 2021)
- Postcode: 5343
- Mean max temp: 23.4 °C (74.1 °F)
- Mean min temp: 10.2 °C (50.4 °F)
- Annual rainfall: 261.7 mm (10.30 in)
Localities around Berri
	Monash
Glossop	Berri	Lyrup
	Gurra Gurra

Berri is a town in the central area of the Riverland region of South Australia. It is 238 kilometres north-east of Adelaide, the capital of the state of South Australia, and a few kilometres west of the SA-Victoria border. It is primarily an agricultural and viticultural town on the north bank of the Murray River. It is the original home of the juice company, Berri Ltd.

== History ==
The name "Berri" originated from the word, “bery bery" from the local Aboriginal tribe, Meri, meaning "a wide bend in the river". The area was first explored by European settlers when Charles Sturt navigated the Murray River. Its first impetus for settlement came when paddle steamers came down the River Murray and a refuelling stop was developed. This was to become Berri. The area was also part of Cobdogla Station pastoral run before it was broken up for closer farming.

In 1910, irrigation was established and Berri was proclaimed as a town in 1911. Irrigation subsequently led to the establishment of vineyards and fruit orchards (such as citrus, apricots and peaches). A distillery was established in 1918 and rail arrived in 1928. In 1943, "Berri Juices" (Berri Ltd) were first produced. By the 1950s, Berri and other Riverland towns dominated the local economy with fruit and their products.

Transport from one side of the Murray to the other consisted of two parallel ferries. These were replaced by a bridge in 1997 which was opened by the Premier of South Australia, John Olsen. It is the largest of its type in South Australia. It was estimated that 10,000 people attended the official opening on 27 July 1997. The bridge cost $17 million after 30 years of lobbying. The bridge spans the Murray River between Berri and Loxton.

== Geography and climate ==
Berri has a warm temperate semi-arid climate (Köppen: BSk), with very warm, dry summers and mild, slightly wetter winters. Mean maxima vary from 31.1 °C (88.0 °F) in January to 15.5 °C (59.9 °F) in July, while mean minima fluctuate between 15.2 °C (59.4 °F) in January and 5.3 °C (41.5 °F) in July. Annual precipitation is rather low, averaging 261.3 mm (10.29 in) between 68.1 precipitation days. The climate is evident by its location, north of Goyder's Line and surrounded by mallee scrub. Berri is also near Renmark, South Australia and Mildura. It is 31 metres above sea level.

Climate data for Berri (34º16'48"S, 140º36'00"E, 66 m AMSL) (1915-1965 normals)
Month	Jan	Feb	Mar	Apr	May	Jun	Jul	Aug	Sep	Oct	Nov	Dec	Year
Mean daily maximum °C (°F)	31.1 (88.0)	30.2 (86.4)	28.1 (82.6)	22.6 (72.7)	18.9 (66.0)	15.8 (60.4)	15.5 (59.9)	17.2 (63.0)	20.8 (69.4)	23.5 (74.3)	26.9 (80.4)	29.7 (85.5)	23.4 (74.1)
Mean daily minimum °C (°F)	15.2 (59.4)	15.0 (59.0)	13.4 (56.1)	10.1 (50.2)	7.9 (46.2)	6.2 (43.2)	5.3 (41.5)	5.9 (42.6)	7.7 (45.9)	10.0 (50.0)	12.1 (53.8)	14.2 (57.6)	10.3 (50.5)
Average precipitation mm (inches)	16.5 (0.65)	22.1 (0.87)	11.4 (0.45)	16.5 (0.65)	27.6 (1.09)	26.0 (1.02)	24.3 (0.96)	27.1 (1.07)	26.8 (1.06)	24.3 (0.96)	19.9 (0.78)	19.2 (0.76)	261.3 (10.29)
Average precipitation days (≥ 0.2 mm)	2.8	3.2	2.6	4.6	7.1	8.3	9.2	9.3	6.7	6.2	4.5	3.6	68.1
Average afternoon relative humidity (%)	25	29	31	41	51	57	55	47	37	33	28	27	38
Source: Bureau of Meteorology (1915-1965 normals)

== Berri today ==
Berri is a multicultural town with a café and a hotel on the riverside, a main street that overlooks the river and other shopping facilities elsewhere in the town, such as the Riverland Plaza.

The Berri Visitors Centre shares a spot on the waterfront at the bottom of Vaughan Terrace with River Jacks cafe. This is a popular gathering point for Berri professionals and tourists alike, not undue to its waterfront location, alfresco dining and proximity to the visitors centre itself.

The river itself offers fishing, waterskiing and boating. A boat launching marina is located opposite the Berri caravan park on the waterfront. The Martin's Bend wetland offers educational walk and water sports. Nearby is the "Katarapko" section of the Murray River National Park which is a popular area for camping, birdwatching, canoeing and bushwalking.

A past local tourist attraction was the Big Orange, it offered a three-storey high observation deck over the plains and river. The facility also offered souvenirs, refreshments and local produce. It opened in 1980 and closed to visitors in 2004. Development ideas for the future of the site included an orchid nursery, waterfall, butterfly house, tropical garden and bird cages.

Horticulture, in particular oranges and grapes is still strong in the area. Berri is situated in an area of 3000 hectares of irrigated fruit orchards. Secondary industries include fruit packing, fruit juice, and wine.

Other events held in Berri are the annual Riverland Wine and Food Festival and Tour of Riverland Cycling.

== Art and culture ==
Berri has several public art works, like the Riverland Vietnam & Post WWII veteran's war memorial, the Aboriginal Dreamtime mural underneath the Berri Bridge, and Jimmy James Memorial on the Berri riverfront.

Jimmy James was a famous blacktracker, who was born around 1910 and belonged to the Pitjantjatjara people. He moved to the Riverland in the 1940s and took his name from his equally famous father-in-law. He was used extensively by the Police in South Australia, Victoria, New South Wales and Northern Territory, to track felons, escapees and missing people. A monument is sculptured out of two slabs of finely polished black granite and engraved with images of birds and animals – a part of Jimmy's spirit world.

== Media ==
Berri was home to a community newspaper, the Berri Community News (3 October 1951 – 19 April 1962), which was later released as Berri News (9 May 1962 – 30 January 1963), subtitled with which is incorporated "the Berri community news". The publication, issued by Berri War Memorial Community Centre Incorporated, concentrated on news and events from Berri, Glossop, Monash, and Winkie.

Channels from the following television networks are available in Berri:

- ABC Television (ABC)
- SBS Television (SBS)
- WIN Television (7, 9 and 10) as RTS-5A and LRS-34 relays the programming from Seven Network (Seven SA), Nine Network (Nine SA) and Network Ten (10 SA), Sky News Regional and Fox Sports News, with local commercials inserted

The town is also home to radio stations Magic 93.1 (93.1 FM) and 5RM (801 AM, 91.5 FM), which broadcast across the Riverland and Murray Mallee regions. Other commercial radio stations in the area include KIX Country (1557 AM), Radio TAB (95.5 FM) and Riverland Life FM (100.7 FM). The multitude of ABC stations include ABC News Radio (93.9 FM), ABC Radio National (1305 AM), ABC Riverland (1062 AM), ABC Classic (105.1 FM), and Triple J (101.9 FM).

== Governance ==
Berri is in the Berri Barmera Council local government area. It is in the state electorate of Chaffey and the federal Division of Barker.

== Born in Berri ==
- Russell Ebert, champion Australian rules footballer
- Rhys Stanley, AFL player with Geelong Football Club
- Luke Saville, professional tennis player
- Kate Morton, author
- Kaiden Brand, Australian Football League
- Alexander Hill, world champion rower
- Ron Battams, Australian rules football played with St Kilda Football Club

== Notable residents ==
- Archie Roach, singer/songwriter
- Ruby Hunter, singer/songwriter
- Hayden Stoeckel, local swimmer

== See also ==
- List of crossings of the Murray River
- South Australian food and drink
