= Pearl Wallace =

Australian riverboat captain (1911–2005)

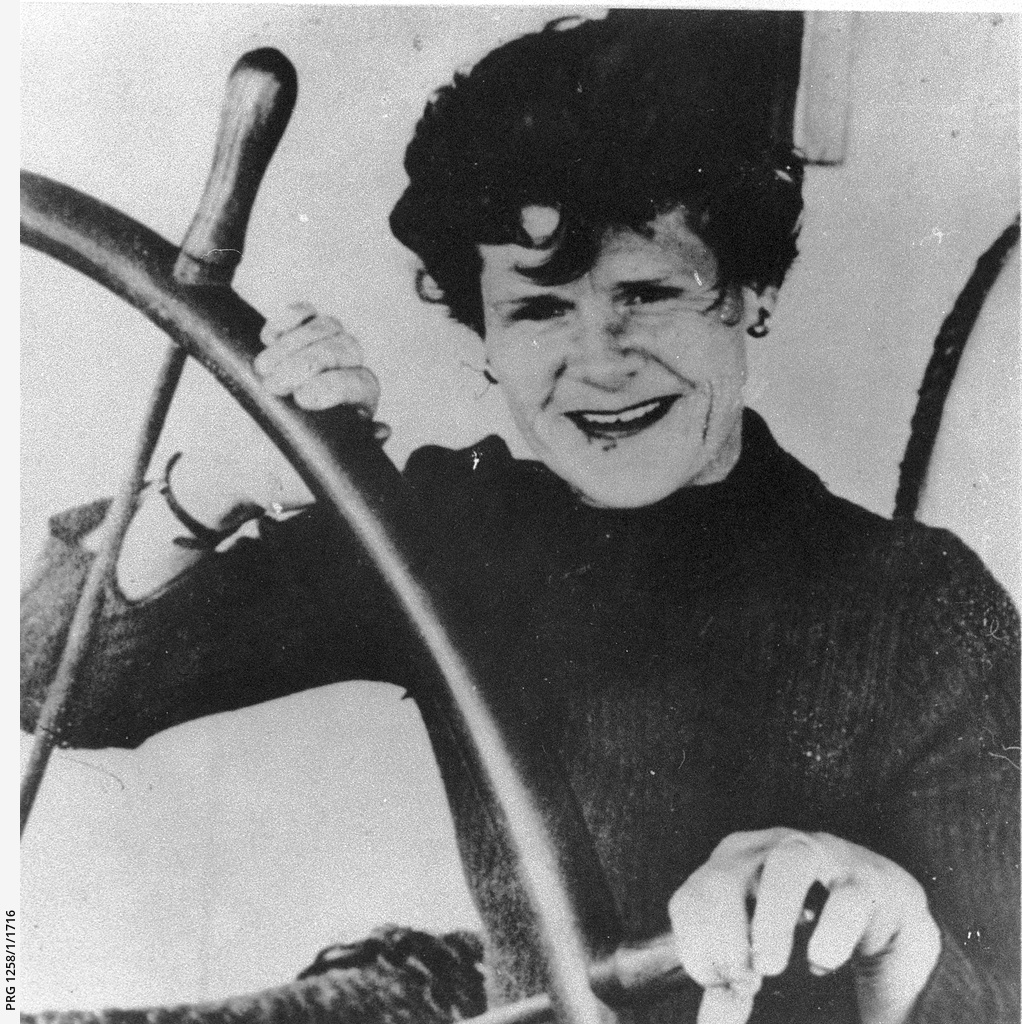
- Born: 2 August 1911; Renmark, South Australia
- Died: 2005 (aged 93–94)
- Known for: Australia's first qualified riverboat skipper

Pearl Wallace (2 August 1911 - 2005), also known as Captain Pearl Hogg, was Australia's first qualified woman master mariner, worked as a riverboat skipper and was the inspiration for the book All the Rivers Run, by Nancy Cato.

== Early life ==
Wallace was born on 2 August 1911 in Renmark, South Australia and raised on the rivers of the Murray-Darling Basin. Wallace grew up in a family of shipwrights and captains, spending her early years on the steamer Alpha, trading along the Darling River. She was the daughter of William Grimwade Collins and Emmie Louise Marshall. Her father, "Old Bill" "Pop" Collins and brothers, Maurice, Norman (Norm), William (Bill), and sister Amy Alpha Collins were well-known shipwrights and captains. Her mother was instrumental in the day-to-day running of the boats taking on housework, mending, and cooking duties as well as working on the deck, piloting and working in the engine room and the pumps.

Amy "Alpha" Collins and Pearl "Royal" Collins were named after the paddle steamers operated by the family, and built by Captain Francis in the early 1890s. At one point the Collins family built up a fleet of 17 paddle steamers, the most notable, the P.S. Alpha and P.S. Fairy.

Her father taught her school lessons in the wheelhouse and educated her about the river. She became an accomplished deck hand and navigator under his tuition. She also attended various land schools and had access to tutors along the river.

In 1919, the family returned to Renmark, where they transported supplies to new soldier settlement areas, including firewood for pumping stations and materials for constructing Locks 5 and 6.

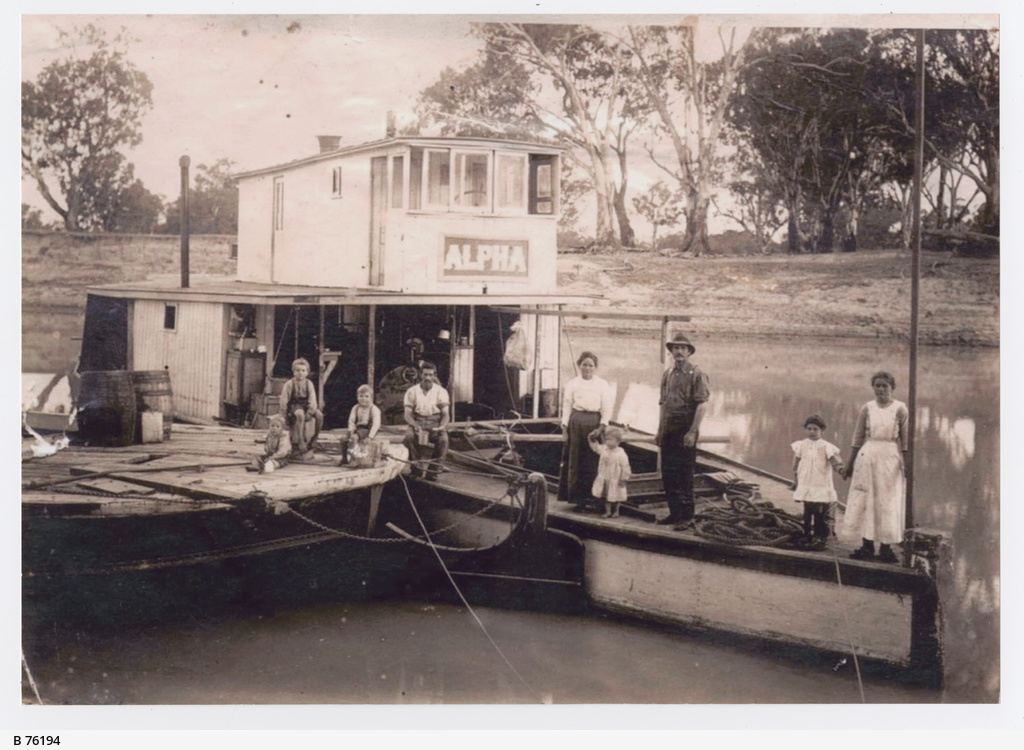
The Collins Family aboard the "P.S. Alpha", 1914.

== Career ==
Captain Pearl Wallace became Australia's first female riverboat skipper in 1947, after earning her River Master's Certificate.

She operated the PS Kookaburra, gifted to her by her father, after its launch in 1948 taking contracts to transport firewood, especially from the flooded Pike River.

During the 1956 flood, Wallace captained the Vega barge, carrying a large wool cargo along the Darling River, towed by PS Success. She later overhauled the Kookaburra and worked at Murray Bridge, clearing irrigation sluices post-flood.

Wallace retired from captaining in 1977 with her last journey helming the PS Canberra in Echuca. She was active in the Murray Skippers Association, receiving Life Membership.

== Legacy ==
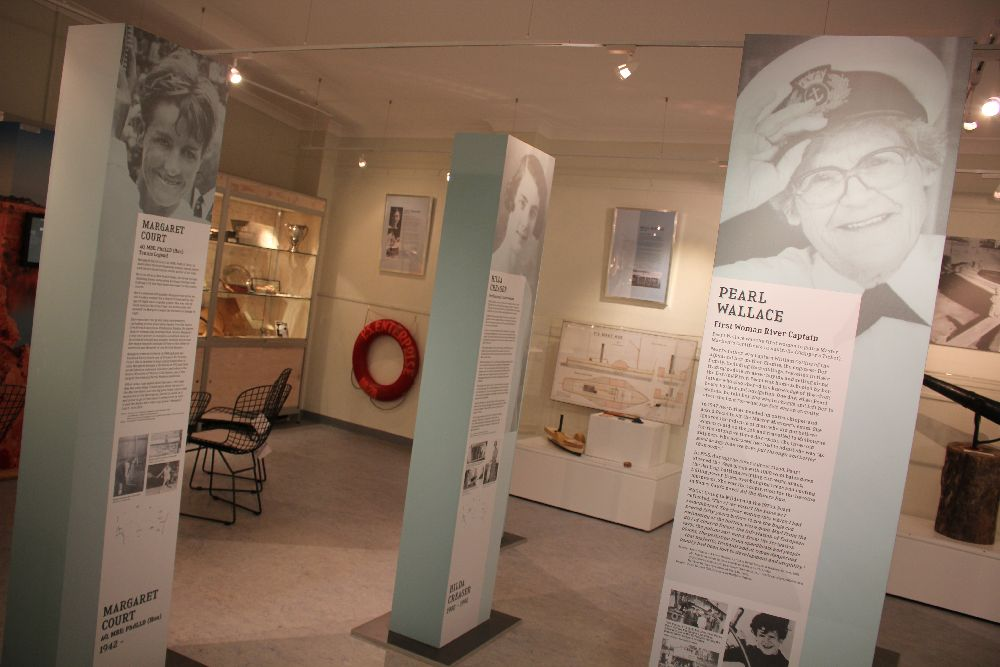
Pearl Wallace as depicted in the Women of the River Country Exhibition, 2015.

In the 1950s, while at Murray Bridge, she met author Nancy Cato, who was inspired by her life to write All the Rivers Run, which became a popular TV mini-series filmed in Echuca.

A timber bollard statue was erected along the Murray River in Nyah, Victoria, to honour her contributions. The statue was incorrectly painted with a bushy brown beard after being damaged in the 2011 Swan Hill floods, an error that went unnoticed for 12 years. The error was brought to light by her grandson, who informed the local council about the incorrect representation. The council responded, consulting with Wallace's family and commissioning artist Rhonda Avery to repaint the statue accurately.

Wallace is also the subject of silo art in Paringa, South Australia. The artwork also depicts the PS Industry passing Headings Cliff Lookout, against a silhouette of Wallace.

Her life story was published in the book Pearl Wallace: A River Woman in 2001. Her story also features in the travelling exhibition, Women of the River Country, curated by the Mannum Dock Museum.

== Personal life ==
She married Neil Dryburgh Wallace in 1931. They divorced in 1954. She later married Hillary Hogg, captain of the PS Canberra.

After retirement she settled in Balhannah, in the Adelaide Hills.

Wallace died in 2005.
