= Yamba, South Australia =

Yamba South Australia
- Coordinates: 34.36°S 140.86°E
- Postcode(s): 5340
- Elevation: 27 m (89 ft)
- Location: 17 km (11 mi) southeast of Renmark
- State electorate(s): Chaffey
- Federal division(s): Barker
Localities around Yamba:
	Wonuarra
Pike River	Yamba	Murray-Sunset (Victoria)
	Taldra

Yamba is a locality in the eastern Riverland of South Australia. It is the last place in South Australia on the Sturt Highway before crossing into Victoria. It is the site of a permanent fruit fly inspection checkpoint, and a large advertisement in the shape of an arc of a vehicle tyre spanning the road.

Yamba was previously served by a station on the Barmera railway line.

== Fruit fly checkpoint ==
On the westward journey, Yamba is the first place in South Australia on the Sturt Highway, and is usually a mandatory stop at the fruit fly biosecurity checkpoint as fruit is not permitted to be carried into South Australia to preserve the state's fruit-fly-free status. The checkpoint has operated since 1957, when it was quickly established in response to a fruit fly outbreak at Mildura. The primary threat on this route is Queensland fruit fly.
