= Lindsay Point, Victoria =

Lindsay Point
- Town
- Coordinates: 34.10°S 141.017°E
- Country: Australia
- State: Victoria
- LGA: Rural City of Mildura
- Location: 665 km (413 mi) from Melbourne; 130 km (81 mi) from Mildura; 31 km (19 mi) from Renmark; 26 km (16 mi) from Paringa

Government
  - State electorate: Mildura
  - Federal division: Mallee

Population
  - Total: 34 (2021 census)
Localities around Lindsay Point
Chowilla, South Australia	New South Wales	New South Wales
Murtho, South Australia	Lindsay Point	Murray-Sunset
Wonuarra, South Australia	Murray-Sunset	Murray-Sunset

Lindsay Point is a locality in northwestern Victoria, Australia, located approximately 130 km from Mildura. Its northern extremity, located at 33.981°S 140.963°E, is less than one kilometre from the South Australian town of Murtho and is notable for being the only location in Victoria that lies to the west of a portion of the state of South Australia.
