= Murtho, South Australia =

Town in South Australia

Murtho
- Town
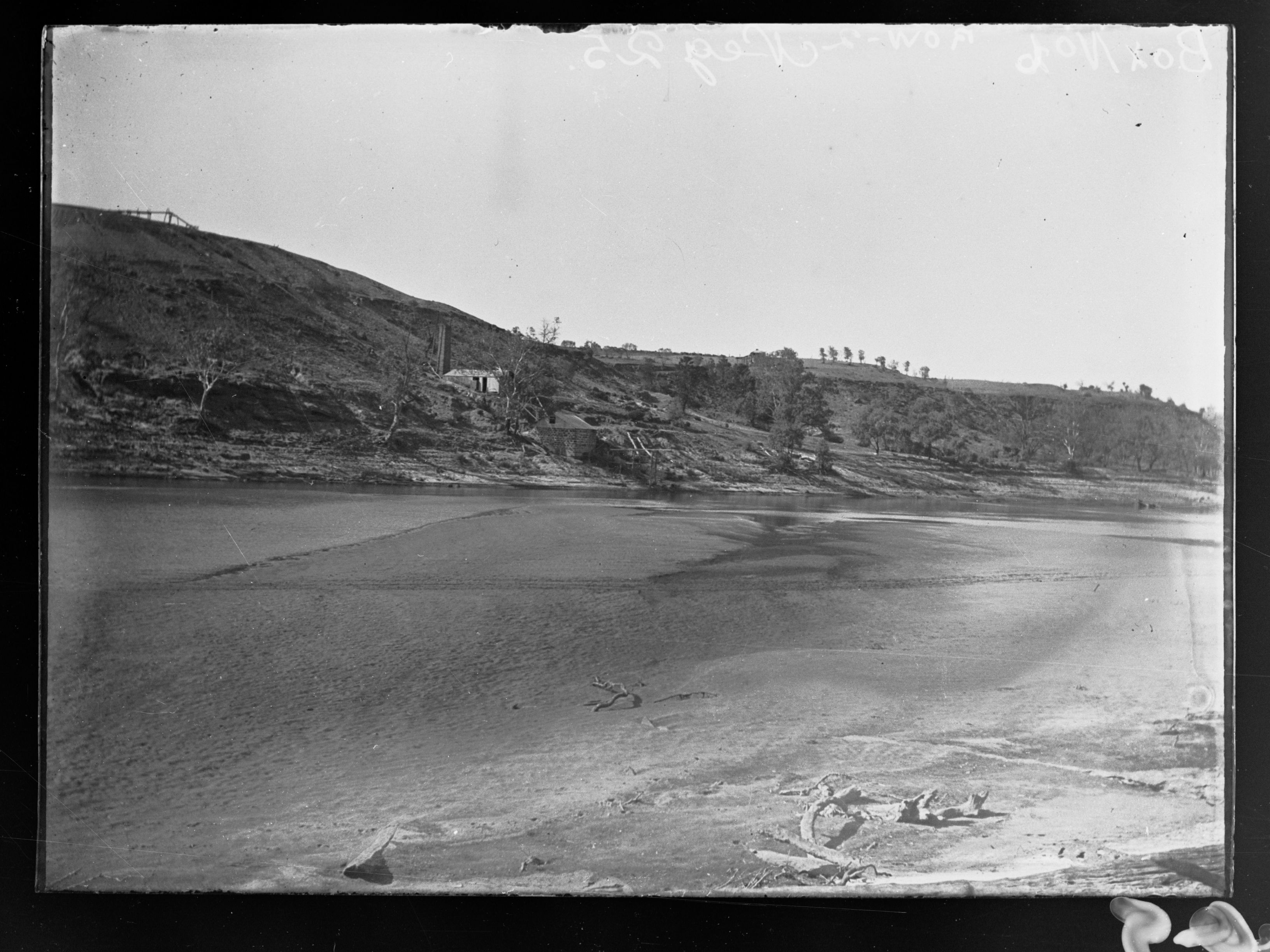
- Murtho pumping station, 1914

- Coordinates: 34.1°S 140.9°E
- Country: Australia
- State: South Australia
- LGA: Renmark Paringa Council

Government
  - State electorate: Chaffey
  - Federal division: Barker

Population
  - Total: 195 (SAL 2021)
- Postcode: 5340
Localities around Murtho
Calperum Station	Chowilla
Renmark North	Murtho	Lindsay Point, Victoria
Paringa	Wonuarra

Murtho is a locality in South Australia. It is north-east of Renmark and Paringa. It is bounded by the River Murray (Note: The naming principles for locations in South Australia issued by the Government of South Australia include: ... "'river' should be used as a generic term following the specific name of the feature – e.g. 'Onkaparinga River' – except when referring to the River Torrens or River Murray.") on its north and west sides and the Victorian border on the east.

Land around Murtho today is used for vineyards and orchards irrigated from the river, and cereal crops. It has a boat ramp and shop which supports campers and recreational fishing.

Before Australian federation in 1901, Murtho was the site of the South Australian customs house known as Border Cliffs, charging import duty on goods being brought down the river from New South Wales and Victoria.

A village settlement was established at Murtho, 2–3 miles (3–5 km) upstream of Renmark (on the opposite bank) in the 1890s as a socialist colony. The Village Settlements established under Part VII of the Crown Lands Amendment Act 1893 were mostly used by unemployed people seeking a fresh start during an economic depression. Murtho was different in that it required financial commitment by the members and no government handouts. Chairman of the Murtho Co-operative Village Settlement Association was Henry Cordeaux (?–1902). By 1897, Murtho had 60–70 acres (24–28 ha) under irrigation. However, by 1899 the settlement, like many others, had been largely abandoned. It failed chiefly through inadequate irrigation: the settlement was atop a 120 feet (37 m) cliff. This was initially seen as an advantage, as the land sloped away from the banks, thus easier to irrigate but the double-acting plunger pump used to raise water to this height was expensive, inefficient, and could barely cope with 20 feet (6.1 m) of suction lift during "normal" low river levels, and failed utterly when the river dropped further. Further, the cost of transporting provisions and produce by river was exorbitant (dearer per ton than from London to Adelaide); and rabbits, which bypassed wire netting fences by scaling the cliffs, took much of the crops. Among the Murtho settlers were brothers John Napier Birks (1845–1929) and Walter Richard Birks (1847–1900), of Adelaide's prominent Birks family.

In the 1960s, Murtho almost became the south bank (actually the east end of the dam wall) of the Chowilla Dam. This dam would have impounded a vast area, mostly upstream of the state borders in New South Wales and Victoria, in a relatively shallow reservoir to provide security of water supply to South Australia. Preparations were made to build the dam, including a railway line built in 1967 to cart rock for the construction, but the increasing cost estimates and environmental concerns caused the dam to be deferred then cancelled.

== Heritage listings ==
Murtho has a number of heritage-listed sites, including:

- Lock 6 Road: Graves of Passengers of the PS Bunyip
- Wilkinson Road: Wilkadene
- Murtho Road: Border Cliffs Customs House
