= Renmark railway station =

Former railway station in South Australia, Australia

Renmark

General information
- Operator: Australian National
- Line: Barmera line
- Platforms: 1
- Tracks: 1

Construction
- Structure type: Ground

Other information
- Status: Closed and mostly demolished

History
- Opened: 1927
- Closed: 1990

Services
| Preceding station | Australian National Railways Commission | Following station |
|---|---|---|
| Paringa towards Adelaide | Barmera railway line | Berri towards Barmera |

Renmark railway station was located on the Barmera railway line. It served the town of Renmark, South Australia.

== History ==
Renmark railway station opened in 1927 as the short lived terminus of the Brown's Well railway line, which was soon extended to Barmera with the first passenger train running on 1 August 1928. The station consisted of a railway yard, a main building and a platform. The line through Renmark closed in 1990; most of the station yard has been demolished except for the goods crane.
