= Riverland Paddling Marathon =

Paddling competition in Australia

The Riverland Paddling Marathon (RPM) is a paddling marathon held over 3 days on the June Long weekend on the Murray River from Berri to Morgan in South Australia. The RPM is not a single event but 6 events that are run consecutively. The RPM has been presented by the Marathon Canoe Club of South Australia since 1988. The other notable Paddling Marathon on the Murray is the Murray Marathon which is run further upstream in Victoria.

The RPM 200 covers the entire distance on the Murray River from Martins Bend (a few kilometers upstream from Berri) to Morgan (208 km). At first light on Saturday morning, paddlers leave Martins Bend and pass through lock 4 on their way to the finish at Moorook. Day 2, Sunday morning sees the paddlers again leave at first light from Moorook, passing through lock 3 and finishing at Waikerie. The Monday morning, the paddlers leave well before sunrise and head downstream, passing through lock 2 and finishing at Morgan.

The RPM 200 is often quoted as one of the toughest Kayak marathon events in Australia by paddlers - with the 208 km in the middle of winter, where it is not uncommon for paddlers to often start each day near zero degrees and even sub-zero temperatures on the Monday morning. It takes a truly dedicated Marathon Paddler to complete the RPM 200

The RPM 100 is the most popular event and attracts the highest number of competitive paddlers and covers a total of 93 km. The RPM 100 paddlers start mid-morning at around the 1/2 way mark for the RPM 200 paddlers each day.

The RPM 200, 200Relay and the RPM 100 events maintain a fastest recorded time for the various classes, which adds another element to the competitive nature of the event.

The Mini Marathon is a 10–12 km leg each day and serves as an introductory Marathon event. This event introduces first time Marathon paddlers and the more social paddlers to both the spectacular Murray River and to Marathon Paddling. The other options for the RPM are the RPM 200 Relay, SDS - Single day covering the RPM 100 course on the Sunday and the RPM 50 - Day 1 and 3 of the Mini and day 2 of the 100 and serves as a stepping stone from the Mini to the longer events. All events share a common finishing line each day, all starts are staged throughout each day with the aim of all paddlers regardless of their chosen event to finish within a 1-2 hour window.

== History ==
The Riverland paddling Marathon has been run every year since 1988 and in the first year there was just the single 208km Event. The Legs for each day were chosen based on free campsites along the river at the end of each day.

The next year the 100km event was added and over the years additional events were added to appeal to all paddlers.

== Logistics ==
The RPM is unique in Paddling Marathons in Australia where the majority of the Committee are committed marathon paddlers in their own right and paddle in either the 200 or 100 themselves. The event relies heavily on the numerous volunteers who make this event possible.

== Craft and classes ==
There is a wide range of craft and classes to choose from. Craft classes include the ICF K (Kayak) and C (Canoe) Classes, TK classes as well as several Recreational classes, including Sea Kayaks, Skis and even SUPs (Stand Up Paddle Boards). The RPM also caters for 2 junior age classes - under 16 and under 18, the Open age class, and Veteran age classes - vet35+, vet45+, vet55+, vet65+ and vet70+.

== Gallery ==
Gallery of photos from 2012 onward available from the Official Photographers website in external links below.
