= Renmark Paringa Council =

Coordinates: 34.17°S 140.748889°E

- Local government area
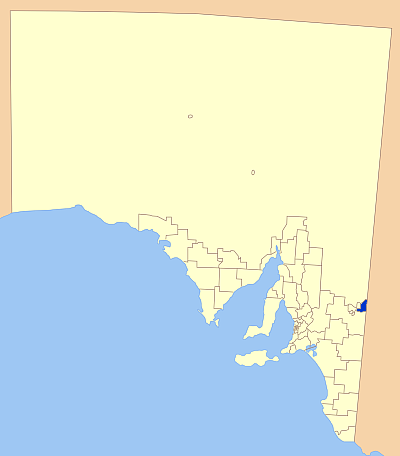
- Location of the Renmark Paringa Council

- Interactive map of Renmark Paringa Council
- Country: Australia
- State: South Australia
- Region: Murray and Mallee
- Established: 1996
- Council seat: Renmark

Government
  - Mayor: Peter Hunter
  - State electorate: Chaffey
  - Federal division: Barker

Area
  - Total: 915.5 km^{2} (353.5 sq mi)

Population
  - Total: 9,926
  - Density: 10.8422/km^{2} (28.0811/sq mi)
- Website: Renmark Paringa Council
LGAs around Renmark Paringa Council
Outback Communities Authority	Outback Communities Authority
Berri Barmera Council	Renmark Paringa Council	Mildura (Vic)
	District Council of Loxton Waikerie

The Renmark Paringa Council is a local government area located adjacent to the Victorian border, in the Riverland, South Australia. The area is known for its various fruit production, and is heavily dependent on the River Murray as a water source. The council seat is at Renmark.

== History ==
The earliest inhabitants of the district area were the Naralte aboriginal people, who lived on the food provided by the river and surrounding areas. The word 'Renmark' is thought to be derived from the Naralte word for 'red mud'.

The first European to explore the district was Captain Charles Sturt who rowed a whale boat down the Murrumbidgee in 1829, searching for Australia's 'inland sea' and reached the junction with the Murray River on 14 January 1830.

The Canadian Chaffey brothers are honoured as founders of Renmark, and were invited to Australia to create an irrigation colony at Mildura. After delays in the Mildura project, an agreement for the establishment of an irrigation colony at Renmark was signed in 1887. Vineyards and fruit blocks slowly emerged throughout the district, sealing the fate of the district as a fruit and wine growing region.

In 1893, the ‘Renmark Irrigation Trust’ was established to provide water to the growers. In the early years, the Trust also played the primary role in the administration and governing of the settlement.

The 'Town of Renmark' and the 'District Council of Paringa' were established not long after.

The Renmark Paringa Council came into existence on 1 July 1996 with the amalgamation of the District Council of Paringa and the Town of Renmark.

== Geography ==
Renmark and Paringa are the largest towns and the centres of the district; it also contains a number of smaller towns and localities, including Chaffey, Cooltong, Crescent, Gurra Gurra, Lyrup, Mundic Creek, Murtho, Old Calperum, Pike River, Renmark South, Renmark West, Wonuarra and Yamba, and parts of Monash and Renmark North.

== Economy ==
The towns in the district are heavily reliant on irrigated orchards and vineyards, with water supplied by the river. Sheep grazing and dryland farming of various cereal crops are the main land uses east of the river, with farming and horticulture to the west of the river.

While wine grape production is the most important industry, there are also large nut and citrus plantations in the region, as well as vegetable and stone fruit production.

Tourism is an important component of the economy, especially during summer school holidays. The district experiences in an influx of tourists during this period, attracted mainly by the River Murray. Houseboats are common along the stretch of river in the district, with other water sports such as water skiing, jet skiing and fishing common. There is a wide range of accommodation in the district.

== Councillors ==
Ward	Councillor	Notes
Mayor	Peter Hunter	
Unsubdivided	Margaret Howie	
Unsubdivided	James John	
Unsubdivided	Maria Spano	
Unsubdivided	Ben Townsend	
Unsubdivided	David Sims	
Unsubdivided	Stephanie Brauer	
Unsubdivided	Jack Gibb	
Unsubdivided	Frank Turton	

The Renmark Paringa Council has a directly-elected mayor.

== See also ==
- List of parks and gardens in rural South Australia
