= Renmark Post Office =

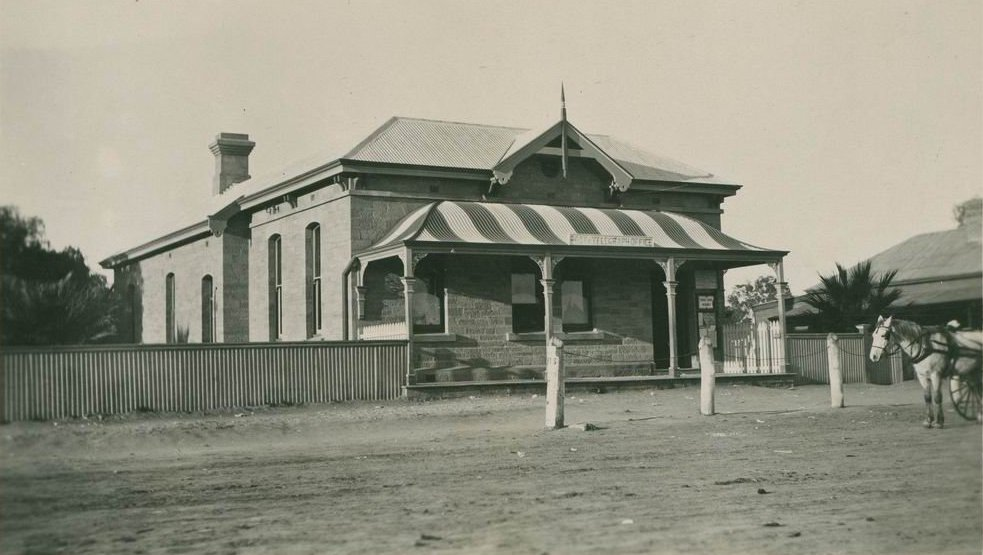

- Location within South Australia
- 34.1705°S 140.7501°E
- Location: 24 Ral Ral Avenue, Renmark, South Australia, Australia

Commonwealth Heritage List
- Official name: Renmark Post Office
- Type: Listed place (Historic)
- Designated: 8 November 2011
- Reference no.: 106138

Renmark Post Office is a heritage-listed post office at 24 Ral Ral Avenue, Renmark, South Australia, Australia. It was added to the Australian Commonwealth Heritage List on 8 November 2011.

== History ==
The town of Renmark was founded in 1887 following a joint agreement between the Colonial government and Canadian engineers George and Ben Chaffey. The brothers were instrumental in helping to establish the system of irrigation in use on the Murray River today, and Renmark is Australia's oldest irrigation settlement. Postal services commenced in Renmark in 1888 and a telegraph office was proposed in 1890. The original Renmark Post Office was constructed on the site of the current building in 1892 and was extended 1921. The original building was modernised in 1964 but demolished in March 1967 to provide for the current building.

The present post office was completed in February 1968 and officially opened on 18 March of that year. Unusually for the era, it incorporated an adjoining residence. A detached automatic telephone exchange was constructed c. 1973. It underwent a retail post shop refurbishment c. 1990s including relocation of rear (east) wall further east to enlarge space by approximately one metre; new counters and display joinery, lighting, carpet, signage and floor tiling to entrance threshold.

== Description ==
Renmark Post Office is at 24 Ral Ral Avenue, Rowing Club Lane, Renmark, comprising the whole of Lot D23805 A101.

The L-shaped site is at the corner of Ral Ral Avenue and Rowing Club Lane which extends from Renmark's civic precinct through to parkland fronting the River Murray. Located in the principal civic and commercial precinct, neighbouring buildings include the 1930s civic centre, 1920s Soldiers' Memorial Hall, 1960s police station and Commonwealth Bank. The original complex comprises two distinct, yet integrated sections which relate to the post office and residential use. The post office is designed on an almost square plan, built to both street frontages at the northwest corner of the site, with the attached residential component on a rectangular plan set back from the main street frontage on the southern side.

The post office plan is a neat integration of postal hall, counter area and back office with a bank of service rooms on the northwest side, a roofed inlet for a large private letter box and gathering area on the southeast side, and a lunchroom, store and integrated loading bay projecting from the northeast side.

The facade presents a picture-frame elevation, with the box alley and main entrance left open and the post hall marked out by a row of precast blade columns set at right angles to the fascia above, all of which have a pebblecrete finish. The end fin walls return along the side elevations to give the illusion of a 3-dimensional "box" floating on the front. The wide sill beneath the blades is finished with white mosaic tiles and the whole composition rests on a recessed brown face brick plinth. A long (possibly non-original or altered) disabled access ramp extends the full width of the front elevation and meets the entrance steps at the post box alley. Other elevations are a combination of cream face brick walls on a brown face brick plinth with aluminium-framed highlight strip windows and a deep metal fascia above. The post box alley is lined on three sides by box cabinets divided into regular bays by structural columns and are surrounded by mosaic tiles, now overpainted. An original timber slat bench is located within the undercroft area opposite the main entrance which contains metal-framed sliding doors.

The attached quarters to the southeast side is compositionally integral with the original building while it presents as a secondary cuboid form. All elevations display cream face brick on a brown brick plinth, with a single slot window opening facing the street.

A small galvanised steel and Cyclone wire bicycle shed is located in the reduced rear yard.

Further east, but now subdivided, the original yard contains a cream brick automatic telephone exchange and small timber-framed linesman's depot.

=== Condition and integrity ===
Externally, the Renmark Post Office is almost completely intact to its 1968 date of construction, with the exception of minor (and relatively superficial) alterations to the main entrance and loading dock areas. It helps demonstrates the characteristic commercial/retail approach to the visual and programmatic aspects of post office buildings and the increased reliance on motorization at the time. The attached quarters are also substantially intact externally. Internally, the complex maintains a similarly high level of integrity throughout the building, with the exception of the post retail shop which has been reoriented, refurbished and slightly enlarged. The original internal planning is largely clearly discernable and demonstrates the original program of the building including the integrated residence. Further, the integrity of original finishes is also high with original wallpaper, polished joinery and furniture in some areas.

Externally and internally, Renmark Post Office appears to be in sound condition. The exception being structural cracking in the east wall of the lunch room and back office.

== Heritage listing ==
Renmark Post Office was listed on the Australian Commonwealth Heritage List on 8 November 2011.

Renmark Post Office, constructed in 1968, is a late example of a post office with integrated residential component, more commonly accommodated on a separate site, if at all, in this period. Typologically, Renmark is a largely internally and externally intact example of a regional retail post office facility. It demonstrates the visual and programmatic characteristics of the type including application of modern architectural styling, a diminished civic imagery, the retail shop function, and the combination of frontal retail and rear handling components. It also has a degree of rarity through being a late example of the use of an integrated residential component. Stylistically and architecturally, Renmark Post Office owes its compositional approach to the accomplished Modern movement in architecture. It gains monumental urban presence through adaptation of a floating box frame facade form in its deep fascia and return walls, "elevated" over a darker coloured brick plinth. The building also reflects a conscientious and competent attempt to deal with the hot local climate.

The significant components of Renmark Post Office include the main postal building and attached residence constructed in 1968. The extension to the rear loading dock and the bicycle shed located in the rear yard are not significant. The telephone exchange and linesman's depot to the north are also not significant.
