= Pike River Conservation Park =

Protected area in South Australia

- IUCN category III (natural monument or feature)
- Location within South Australia
- Location: South Australia
- Nearest city: Paringa
- Coordinates: 34°12′06″S 140°47′43″E
- Area: 2.88 km^{2} (1.11 sq mi)
- Established: 1 February 1979
- Governing body: Department for Environment and Water

Pike River Conservation Park is a protected area located in the Australian state of South Australia in the locality of Mundic Creek about 215 kilometres (134 mi) north-east of the state capital of Adelaide and about 2 kilometres (1.2 mi) south of the town of Paringa.

The conservation park consists of crown land in section 66 the cadastral unit of the Hundred of Paringa. It came into existence on 1 February 1979 by proclamation under the National Parks and Wildlife Act 1972. It is named after Pike River, a stream that flows through its eastern end. On 10 December 2009, crown land in section 84 of the Hundred of Paringa, which was formerly the Mundic Forest Reserve, was added to its extent. It is located at the northern end of the locality of Mundic Creek with a boundary adjoining the Sturt Highway in east. As of 2016, it covered an area of 2.88 square kilometres (1.11 sq mi).

In 1980, it was described as follows:

Pike River Conservation Park protects part of a permanent wetland area and adjacent land on the River Murray flood plain. This area is a valuable feeding and breeding habitat for water birds. Dominant vegetation is open woodland of Eucalyptus camaldulensis and E. largiflorens over an understorey of scattered Muehlenbeckia cunninghamii. Areas of Atriplex vesicaria, Bassia sp. and Tecticornia spp. Low shrublands are also found while reedbeds of Typha sp. and Phragmites australis occupy lagoon shores. A small area above the flood plain is occupied by an open woodland of E oleosa and Myoporum platycarpum. The park only occupies a small portion of a large backwater system. Many of the large E. camaldulensis are dead and the understorey in some areas is dominated by introduced weed species.

The conservation park is classified as an IUCN Category III protected area. In 1980, it was listed on the now-defunct Register of the National Estate.

== See also ==
- Protected areas of South Australia
