= Ron Battams =

Australian rules footballer

Personal information
- Full name: Ronald Henry Battams
- Born: 16 April 1928; Berri, South Australia
- Died: 13 August 2004 (aged 76); Perth, Western Australia
- Original team: Seaford / Flinders Naval Depot
- Height: 182 cm (6 ft 0 in)
- Weight: 74 kg (163 lb)

Playing career^{1}
| Years | Club | Games (Goals) |
| 1952 | St Kilda | 3 (1) |
- ^{1} Playing statistics correct to the end of 1952.

Ronald Henry Battams (16 April 1928 – 13 August 2004) was an Australian rules footballer who played with St Kilda in the Victorian Football League (VFL).

Battams who was in the Australian Navy managed to squeeze in 3 VFL games before the demands of duty restricted his chances. He was recruited from the Flinders Naval Depot. In 1954 and 1955, he was playing for the Sydney Naval team in the NSWFL. He had won the team's best and fairest in 1954.
