= 5RM =

Australia
- Broadcast area: Berri, South Australia, Riverland area, Mallee (Victoria) area
- Frequency: 801 KHz / 91.5 FM

Programming
- Format: Classic Hits

Ownership
- Owner: ARN; (Riverland Broadcasters Pty Ltd)

Technical information
- Transmitter coordinates: 34.2297°S 140.6417°E

Links
- Website: 5rm.com

5RM (801 AM / 91.5 FM) is a South Australian radio station broadcasting from its transmitter site at Renmark into the Riverland and Mallee (Victoria)

5RM was opened in 1935 and was originally part of the 5KA network along with sister station 5AU Port Augusta and the church run 5KA Adelaide.

The station broadcasts from studios located at Kay Avenue in Berri.

As of February 2020, 5RMs Programming consists of Anthony Milich on the 5RM Breakfast Show 6–9 Weekdays, The Leon Byner Morning Show (originating from 5AA Adelaide 9–12 Weekdays and Lachie Winnall 12–6 Weekdays).

In November 2021, 5RM, along with other stations owned by Grant Broadcasters, were acquired by the Australian Radio Network. This deal allows Grant's stations, including 5RM, to access ARN's iHeartRadio platform in regional areas. The deal was finalized on 4 January 2022. It is expected 5RM will integrate with ARN's Pure Gold Network, but will retain its current name according to the press release from ARN.
