= 5AU =

Coordinates: 32.5078°S 137.7772°E

Radio 5AU
- Port Augusta, South Australia; Australia
- Broadcast area: Whyalla, Port Augusta, Port Pirie
- Frequency: 97.9 MHz FM

Programming
- Format: Classic hits

Ownership
- Owner: ARN; (Spencer Gulf Broadcasters Pty Ltd)
- Sister stations: Magic 1059

Links
- Website: 5au.com

Radio 5AU 97.9 MHz FM is a South Australian radio station broadcasting a classic hits format from its transmitter site at The Bluff into the Whyalla, Port Augusta, Port Pirie, Kadina, Moonta and Wallaroo area and north into the Flinders Ranges.

Established with studios in Port Augusta, first broadcast 25 May 1938. Also separate studio facilities in Whyalla.

During the 1940s/1950s they relayed 5KA Adelaide programs in some day-parts. 5AU often broadcast balls from Whyalla and Hawker. Transmission power was upgraded (located at Nectar Brook 32.5 km south of Port Augusta) with an S.T.C. 2,000 watt transmitter in 1961. and relay transmitters at Port Pirie and Roxby Downs.

To improve coverage, particularly into the Whyalla area, the transmitter station was relocated in 1976 to Mambray Creek, 47 km south of Port Augusta. The transmitters were the STC transmitter from Nectar Brook (operating at 2.5 kW) plus a new 2.5 kW unit. The frequency was changed from the original 1450 kHZ to the lower 1240 kHz and later 1242 kHz.

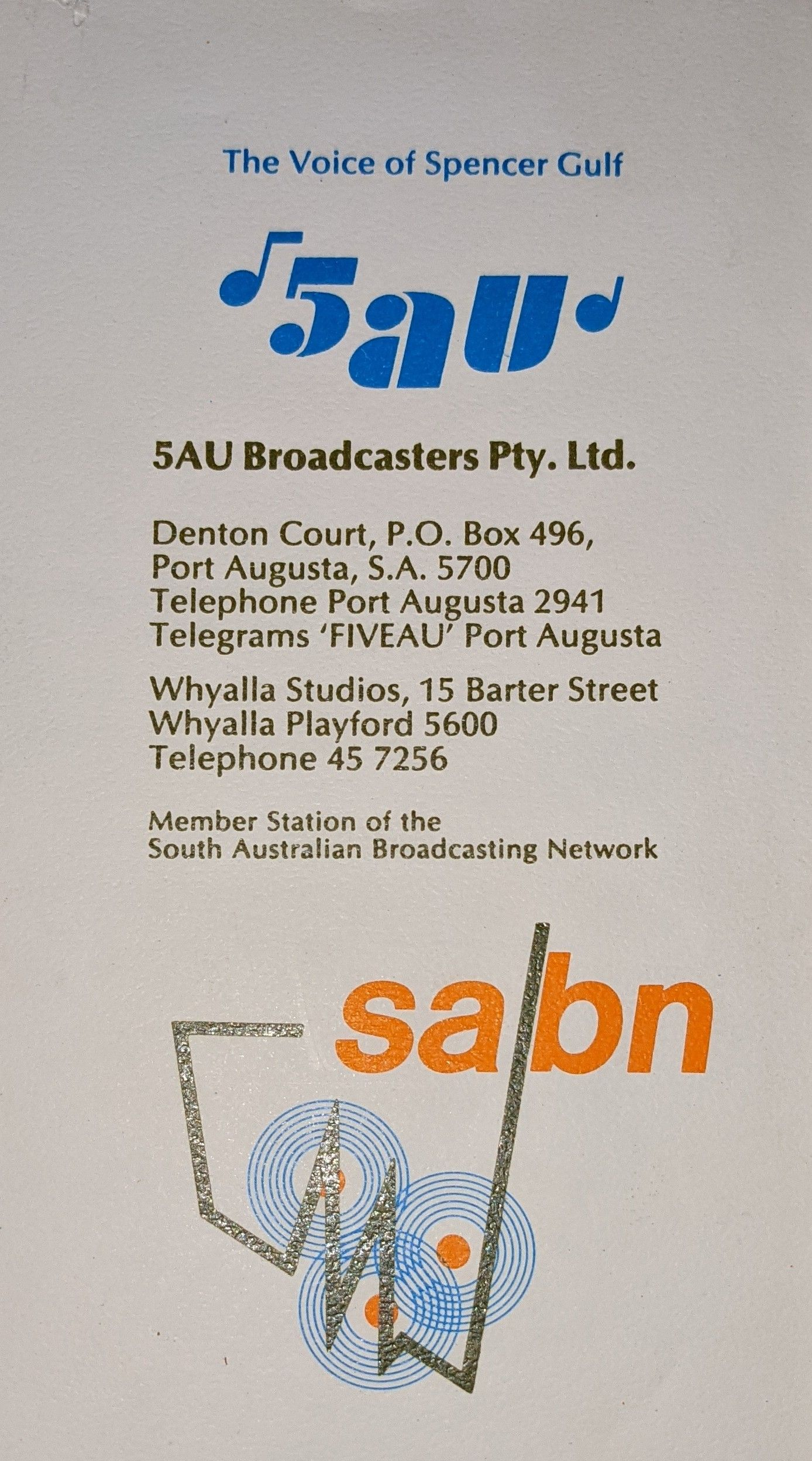
5AU Letterhead early 1970s

Modern studios were opened at Denton Court, Port Augusta in December 1968 and Whyalla studios were rebuilt and commissioned in July 1972 at the 15 Barter Street location.

In the early 1970s, programs were broadcast from both locations, with the breakfast program mainly based at Port Augusta. Mornings, Afternoon, Drive and Nights emanated from Whyalla. The South Australian Broadcasting Network (SABN) grew from ownership of the Methodist church and the Labor party in December 1943. The Network, was ultimately, 5KA Adelaide, 5AU Port Augusta/Whyalla and 5RM Renmark. Under that ownership, advertising was not allowed broadcast on Sundays prior to 1973, when that rule was relaxed.

Many announcers worked at 5AU. Some, from the 1960s, 70's and 80's, include: Dean Matters, Bob Byrne, Bob Reid, Dean Banks, Paul Hodges, Mark Carter, Sue Fraser, David Sabine, Mal Hedstrom, Keith Fowler, Tony Gordon. Mark Watson, Mark Elliston, Peter Morris, Leighton Marshall, Colin Jones, Gary Oborn, Craig Bruce, Paul Wise, Noel McMahon, Rob McCasker, Jim Glennon, Rohan Chabaud, Dave Richardson, Don Plenty.

Ownership: Grant Broadcasters (2013–2022) & Australian Radio Network (since 2022)

On 1 March 2021, 5AU commenced broadcasting on the new FM signal, 97.9FM. 8 months later, in November 2021, 5AU, along with other stations owned by Grant Broadcasters, were acquired by the Australian Radio Network. This deal will allow Grant's stations, including 5AU, to access ARN's iHeartRadio platform in regional areas. The deal was finalized on 4 January 2022. It is expected 5AU will integrate with ARN's Pure Gold Network, but will retain its current name according to the press release from ARN.

In November 2025 5AU vacated its studios of more than 70 years in Denton Court, Port Augusta and moved to new studios on Main Road in Port Pirie, along with sister stations 5CS and Magic 105.9.

Source/s: Australian AM Radio History by Bruce Carty PhD Amplitude Modulated Broadcast Stations in South Australia By Lloyd Butler. Public domain and Generic Australian radio announcers history.
