= Massive Murray Paddle =

Australian canoe/kayak race

The Massive Murray Paddle, formerly the Red Cross Murray Marathon or Murray Marathon, and later the YMCA Massive Murray Paddle, is an Australian 415 km, 5-day canoe/kayak flatwater race on the Murray River. One of the longest annual flatwater canoe races in the world, it starts in Yarrawonga and ends in Koondrook. The race raises funds to assist local community-driven programs.

There are also a number of lead up races to the event. These include the Clarence 100, Hawkesbury Canoe Classic, Echuca Mini, Barwon Mini and the Riverland Paddling Marathon.

== History ==
The event began in 1969 with a few friends organising a fundraiser for the Australian Red Cross, who then managed the event as a major fundraiser, running the event for nearly 40 years.

The Australian Red Cross ended its association with the event after the 2008 race. The YMCA Victoria took over the event from 2009 to 2015.

In 2014, the event was renamed from "Murray Marathon" to "YMCA Massive Murray Paddle", and the date was moved from 27 to 31 December, to late November.

Since 2016, the event has been co-owned by Sydney Harbour Kayaks and Mirage Sea Kayaks.

All funds raised went to the Red Cross from 1969 to 2008, and to the YMCA from 2009 to 2015. From 2016's event, paddlers were able to choose their own charities or social causes to raise funds for.

The 2020 race was cancelled due to the COVID-19 pandemic.

The 2022 race was transferred to February 2023, due to the flooding on the Murray River during October 2022 to January 2023. The race will return to its regular time-slot for November 2023. November will be the 54th running of the race.

During the years around covid, the event underwent a complete review and it was determined that the course needed to alter. Unfortunately, the regular 'Day 5'from Murrabit to Swan Hill was replaced. The event's new course is to be 415km (instead of the 404km) The days are: Day ONE - Yarrawonga to Tocumwal Day Two - Tocumwal to Picnic Point Day Three - Picnic Point to Moama Beach Day Four - Moama Beach to Torrumbarry Day Five - Gunbower to Koondrook

The new last day, will see the race paddle along the Murray River through the Gunbower Forest.

== Craft and entry classes ==
A range of classes cater for a wide range of craft, from racing canoes and kayaks as defined in the ICF regulations, through to touring craft as defined in Australian Canoeing regulations to surf skis, outrigger canoes and recreational paddle-craft such as sea kayaks. There are several special categories for paddlers using Mirage Sea Kayaks

The 2017 event saw a surf boat and several stand-up paddle boards (sups) including a two-person SUP.

Adult or Junior entrants can choose to paddle full distance, (or as long as they can manage), single day challenge or as part of a relay team.

== Route ==
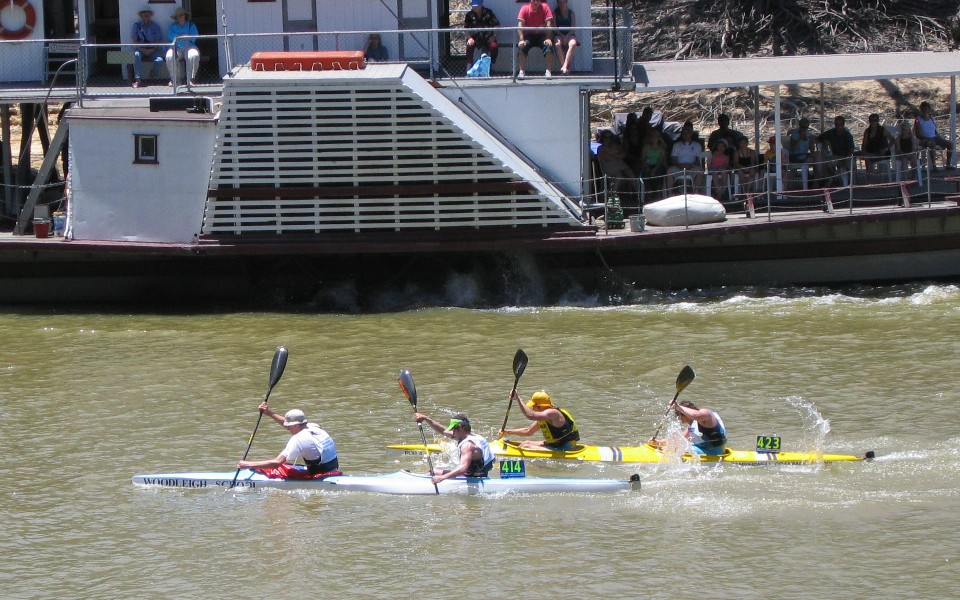
Sprint to the finish at Echuca

Until 2013, the five days were from 27 December to 31 December. This switched to late November from 2014 onwards.

The new official route is to be 415km (instead of the 404km) The days are: Day ONE - Yarrawonga to Tocumwal Day Two - Tocumwal to Picnic Point Day Three - Picnic Point to Moama Beach Day Four - Moama Beach to Torrumbarry Day Five - Gunbower to Koondrook

Officials record each paddler's progress at every checkpoint for safety and time-keeping purposes. Checkpoints allow competitors and teams to change paddlers, pick up refreshments and rest during the event.

A section of the river between Torrumbarry and Gunbower is not paddled. The course is sometimes changed if river and access conditions dictate, but total distance is maintained as best as possible. In some years, difficulty accessing the checkpoints (or due to extreme weather conditions) for Day 2 has seen the Day 1 course paddled twice.
