= Baringa =

Baringa may refer to:

- Baringa, Democratic Republic of the Congo, a village in Tshuapa Province, Befale Territory
- Baringa, Queensland, a suburb in the Sunshine Coast Region, Queensland, Australia
- Baringa (mammal), within the subfamily Macropodinae
