= ABC Riverland =

Coordinates: 34.170376°S 140.749841°E

- Australia
- Broadcast area: Riverland
- Frequency: 1062 kHz AM

Programming
- Format: Talk

Ownership
- Owner: Australian Broadcasting Corporation

History
- First air date: 31 July 1957

Links
- Website: https://www.abc.net.au/riverland/

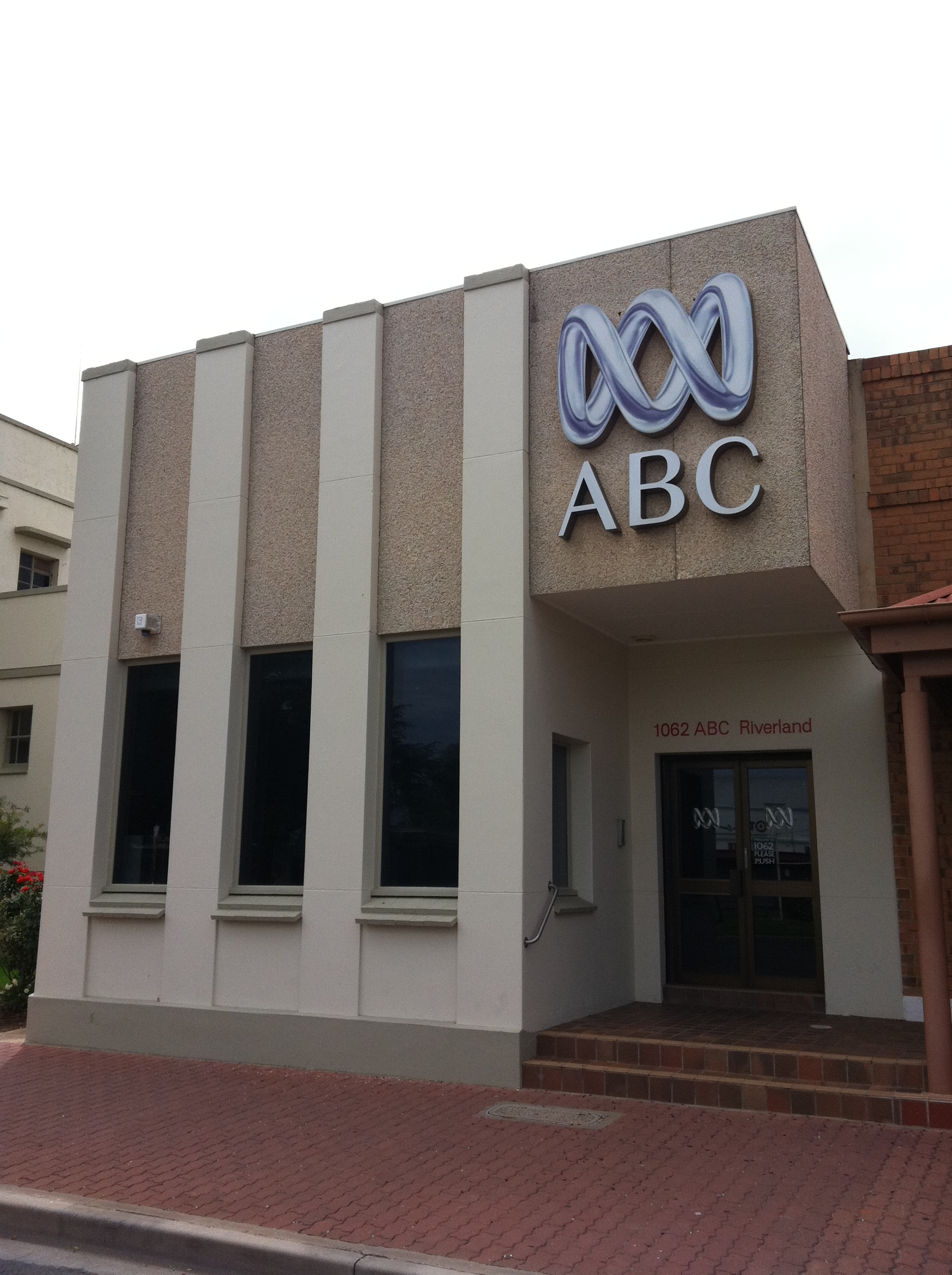
ABC Riverland studios

ABC Riverland is an ABC Local Radio station based in Renmark, South Australia, broadcasting to the Riverland and Mallee region.

== History ==
The station began broadcasting as 5MV on 31 July 1957. It was established to provide radio programs to people in regional and rural communities, to match it with that of the capital city stations.

It was originally earmarked for a 1956 establishment, but it was delayed due to the Murray River Flood of that year. It originally carried a hybrid range of programming, which consisted of local news and rural information. The first regional manager was W. Passek, the first journalist was Fred Sanderson and the first rural reporter was Clem Holdsworth.

Throughout the decades, more local programs fluctuated on the schedule of the station, and in 1989, along with the launch of the station's first current affairs morning program, the station introduced a non-English show, "The Voice of Greece", which was hosted by Jim Grifsas. The station also went through a number of frequency changes throughout its history. They were originally on 1593 AM, before switching to 1305 AM in December 1988, before settling with its current frequency, 1062 AM in November 1996 when Radio National (RN) began broadcasting to the region.

In the late 1980s the station's studios relocated to a street-front at 8 Ral Ral Avenue. A second renovation took place in 2002 when three separate studios were adjoined together into one building, which resulted in a large and open office layout.

The station was also the first regional radio station in Australia to get digital equipment installed.

== Local programming ==
ABC Riverland broadcasts three local programs throughout the week.

- Riverland and South East SA Rural Report 6:15am to 6:30am – presented by Jessica Schremmer and Elsie Adamo
- Riverland Weekday Breakfast 6:35am to 10:00am – presented by Matt Stephens
- Riverland Saturday Breakfast 6:00am to 10:00am – presented by Julie Kimberley

When local programs are not broadcast the station is a relay of ABC Radio Adelaide.

== Staff ==
As of 2025, there are a total of eight full-time staff and several casuals at ABC Riverland.

== See also ==
- List of radio stations in Australia
