= Riverland =

Coordinates: 34°15′S 140°28′E

- Region
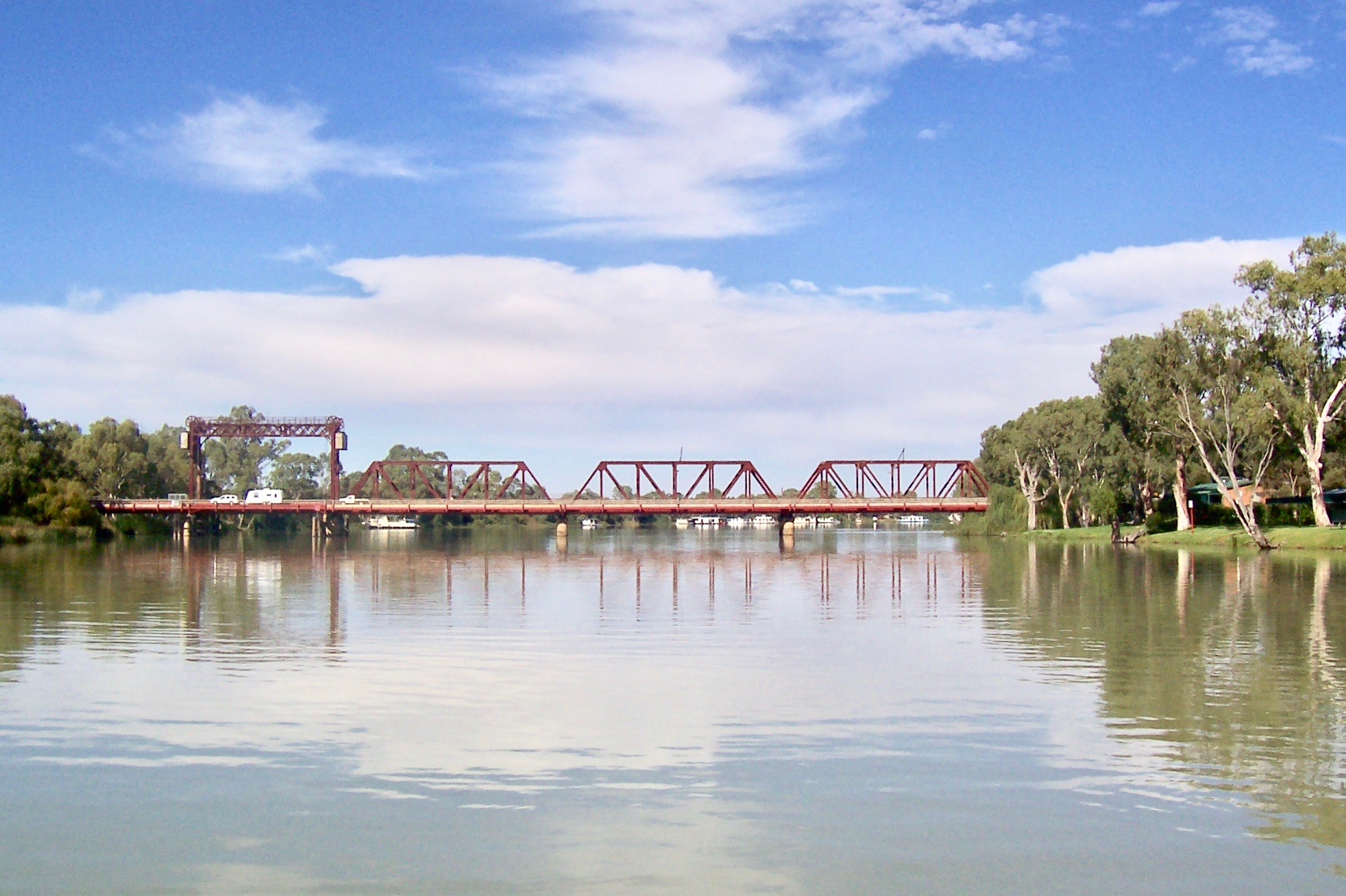
- Paringa Bridge over the River Murray

- Flag
- Country: Australia
- State: South Australia
- LGAs: Berri Barmera; Loxton Waikerie; Mid Murray; Renmark Paringa

Government
  - State electorate: Chaffey, Stuart
  - Federal division: Barker

Population
  - Total: 41,802 (2008)

The Riverland is a region of South Australia. It covers an area of 9,386 square kilometres (3,624 sq mi) along the River Murray (Note: It is customary in South Australia to place "River" first when referring to the two major rivers of the state. The naming principles issued by the Government of South Australia include: ... "'river' should be used as a generic term following the specific name of the feature – e.g. 'Onkaparinga River' – except when referring to the River Torrens or River Murray." South Australians may also place "River" first when referring to the Darling River, the major tributary that joins the Murray in New South Wales.) from where it flows into South Australia from New South Wales and Victoria downstream to Blanchetown. The major town centres are Renmark, Berri, Loxton, Waikerie, Barmera and Monash, and many minor townships. The population is approximately 35,000 people.

The Riverland is located about 1.75 to 3 hours (or 150 to 280 km (93 to 174 mi)) north-east of Adelaide, and 90 minutes west (or 120 to 250 kilometres (75 to 155 mi)) from Mildura, Victoria via the Sturt Highway.

The region has a Mediterranean climate with warm, dry summers and relatively mild winters, and temperatures a few degrees above those of the state capital, Adelaide. The average summer temperature is 32.5 °C (90.5 °F), with a winter average of 16.2 °C (61.2 °F) and an average rainfall of 260.6 millimetres (10.26 in).

It is unlawful to take certain foods in to Riverland without appropriate government certification. The South Australian government has a zero tolerance policy. Those found to be taking restricted foods in to Riverland illegally will be fined.

== History ==
=== Indigenous history ===
At the time of British colonisation of South Australia in the 1830s, and for tens of thousands of years before then, the area today known as the Riverland was inhabited by Aboriginal Australian people, whose name for it is Moorundie Ruwe. At the time of colonisation, these were (from west to east) the Ngaiawang, Ngawait, and Erawirung, sometimes collectively referred to as the Meru people. Based on available data, the pre-European population along the River Murray within South Australia is estimated to have been several thousand people, with a density of up to 0.3 to 1 square kilometre (0.39 sq mi) per person. Ceremonial exchanges were major events, with people travelling from far and wide to participate. At this time, the people of the central River Murray area were "engaged in a broad-based economy embedded in a diverse and highly productive mosaic of riverine habitats".

==== Archaeological finds ====
The oldest known River Murray Indigenous site, a midden of ancient river mussel shells, confirmed the occupation of the site by Aboriginal people for at least 29,000 years. The find has expanded the scarce knowledge of the area's ancient history. A study reporting the find and describing the dating as "based on 31 radiocarbon age determinations" was published on 14 July 2020, saying that this pushes back the previously known occupation of the area by 22,000 years, into the last ice age. The research was carried out as part of an ongoing collaboration between the River Murray and Mallee Aboriginal Corporation (RMMAC) and researchers from Flinders University led by Amy Roberts, and is a first step in a larger project tracking how people lived during that time. Evidence of trade in chert and large sandstone grinding dishes had already been found, but this find helps to show how their ancestors survived times of hardship and plenty.

=== European settlement ===
The first district to be established in the region was Renmark in 1887 by the Chaffey Brothers, who also established the Mildura Irrigation District in the neighbouring upstream region of Sunraysia. Other settlements followed in the 1890s at: Holder, Kingston, Lyrup, Moorook, Murtoa, New Era, New Renmark, Pyap, Ramco and Waikerie.

Some of these irrigation schemes were developed as a government response to the economic depression of the 1890s, where the aim was to keep energy, talent and capital from leaving South Australia using Village Settlement Schemes.

In 1901 a Royal Commission recommended that the settlements be subdivided and leased to individual settlers instead of village associations, and over time most of these areas became government irrigation areas.

Soldier settlement schemes were later allotted for returned servicemen at: Berri, Chaffey, Cadell and Cobdogla from 1917. Loxton and Cooltong were allotted from 1946 on. During World War II, the region hosted an internment camp for people of Japanese, German and Italian origin or descent. This camp was based at Loveday but little remains today to indicate its existence.

In 1956 and 1961 the privately developed Sunlands/Golden Heights schemes were established. As pumping technology became more affordable and efficient, more recent development occurred through private irrigation, where irrigators operated their own pumping infrastructure pumping water from the river. Water trade enabled further growth in these properties from the early 1990s, with the Riverland purchasing water from pasture users in upstream states, or from the downstream lower Murray region, to expand the wine grape and almond industries. Some of this development was funded through managed investment schemes.

== Climate and economy ==
The region enjoys a warm Mediterranean/semi-arid climate, with seasonal temperatures a few degrees above Adelaide’s. The average winter maximum is 16.2 °C (61.2 °F) and the average summer maximum is 32.5 °C (90.5 °F), with a mean annual maximum of 24.3 °C (75.7 °F). Average annual rainfall in Renmark is 260.6 millimetres or 10.3 inches.

The Riverland's economy is driven by primary production: agriculture is the largest employer in the area. The region has sustainable comparative advantages for high value irrigated horticulture, including soils, climate, reliability of water supply, best practice water supply systems, ability to grow a diversity of crops, fruit fly free status and proximity to markets.

The area is Australia's largest wine-producing region, growing over half (63 per cent in 2014) of South Australia's wine grapes. In 2013 the region produced 22 per cent of Australia's wine grape crush with approximately 21,000 hectares (52,000 acres) under wine grapes, which was produced by over 1,000 growers.

The Riverland is also a significant almond and stone fruit-growing region, producing 18 per cent of Australia's almonds and 7 per cent of Australia's fresh stone fruit, and Riverland juices and milk drinks are stocked on supermarket shelves across Australia and internationally.

As of 2020 the Central Irrigation Trust manages irrigation water for 1,600 growers who irrigate 14,000 hectares (35,000 acres) of horticultural crops in 12 private irrigation districts (Berri, Cadell, Chaffey, Cobdogla, Kingston, Loxton, Moorook, Mypolonga, Waikerie, Lyrup, Golden Heights and Sunlands). There is also the Renmark Irrigation Trust, which supplies water to 4,700 hectares or 11,600 acres. All the water is supplied from the River Murray. Many of the towns were established for the re-settlement of soldiers after their return from World War I or World War II. Most towns were established as separate irrigation districts.

== Transport ==
The Riverland is located on the main eastern state transit link, which connects Adelaide to the eastern states.

- Road: The Sturt Highway, a part of the National Highway Network, is the major highway connecting the Riverland region with interstate and overseas freight connections at Adelaide's Outer Harbor and Adelaide Airport. Main roads provide regional access between towns, as well as alternative routes to major regional areas such as Murray Bridge.
- Air: Renmark has a regional airport that provides services for light planes, and potential for future expansion of commuter services. Waikerie airport has a sealed runway and is an operating airfield.
- Rail: The Loxton railway line from Tailem Bend terminates at a grain terminal on the originally called Tookayerta siding. The line is currently stated as open but no trains have operated since 2015.

== Recreation ==
The region is known for its natural wonders, which provide opportunities for guided and self-guided walks, horse-riding, mountain biking and cycling, and canoeing and kayaking on the river and creeks. Lake Bonney, where Donald Campbell achieved the Australian water speed record of 216 miles per hour (348 km/h) in 1964, provides opportunities for sailing, zorbing and windsurfing.

The region also has a strong motorsports culture with its facilities for 4-wheel driving, trail bike or motocross riding, go-kart and speedway.

== Festivals ==
=== Renmark Rose Festival ===
Renmark is well known for its annual Rose Festival, a 10-day long event held in October each year, which is a major tourist attraction. The very first Rose Week was run in 1994, and was the brainchild of Eithne Sidhu, who collaborated with David Ruston, who owns Australia's largest rose garden (11 hectares (27 acres)) and houses the National Rose Collection.

=== Loxton Christmas Light's Festival ===
Starting with a single Christmas light display out on a property in Loxton North, the Loxton Christmas Lights Festival today incorporates many homes throughout the township, and attracts thousands of visitors to the region over the period from November through December each year. It began when Peter Mangelsdorf was inspired to start a small Christmas display known as Christmas Wonderland. The 250 metres (270 yd) frontage of Peter's property is filled with numerous Christmas lights and images, ranging from Bethlehem scenes to popular characters dressed for the festive season.

=== Riverland Food and Wine Festival ===
Held in mid-October each year, the Riverland Food and Wine is the region's main food and wine event showcasing local wines, ales, ciders and spirits, along with local cuisine. Held on the banks of the river, the day includes entertainment, and has become a popular event with locals and visitors alike.

== Tourism ==
Destination Riverland is the Riverland's tourism body; the industry is worth about $148 million annually to the region.

== Governance ==
The Riverland is currently represented at state level in the South Australian House of Assembly by Liberal Member for Chaffey, Tim Whetstone. Federally, Liberal Member for Barker, Tony Pasin is the region's representative in the House of Representatives. Local Liberal politician Nicola Centofanti is a Member of the Legislative Council, while Anne Ruston is a Liberal federal senator for South Australia.

== Education ==
=== Pre-school ===
- Waikerie Children's Centre
- Barmera Kindergarten
- Monash Kindergarten
- Berri Community Preschool
- Renmark West Preschool
- Renmark Children's Centre
- Riverland Early Learning Centre
- Woodleigh – Loxton District Children's Centre
- Loxton Preschool Centre
- Loxton North Kindergarten

=== Primary schooling ===
Public

- Waikerie Primary School
- Ramco Primary School
- Morgan Primary School
- Kingston-on-Murray Primary School
- Cobdogla Primary School
- Barmera Primary School
- Glossop Primary School
- Monash Primary School
- Berri Primary School
- Renmark Primary School
- Renmark West Primary School
- Renmark North Primary School
- Renmark Loxton Primary School
- Loxton North Primary School
- Loxton Primary School

Private and religious

- Waikerie Lutheran Primary School
- St Joseph’s Primary School, Barmera
- Rivergum Christian College, Glossop
- Our Lady of the River Catholic School, Berri
- St Joseph’s School
- Loxton Lutheran School
- St Albert's Catholic School, Loxton

=== Senior schooling ===
Public high schools across the Riverland region

- Waikerie High School
- Berri Regional Secondary College
- Renmark High School
- Loxton High School

Private secondary

- Rivergum Christian College, Glossop
- St Francis of Assisi College, Renmark

=== Special education ===
- Riverland Special School

=== Further education ===
TAFE SA has a centrally located campus in Berri.

== Conservation ==
Designations

Ramsar Wetland
- Official name: Riverland
- Designated: 23 September 1987
- Reference no.: 377

The predominant natural environment consists of river red gum and black box forests that line the river banks and flood plains, as well as steep cliffs. The Riverland is abundant in wildlife, the more common species encountered being pelicans, kookaburras, brush tail possums and Perons tree frogs. Less common species include koalas (introduced to Renmark), bush stone curlews and carpet pythons (rated "vulnerable" to extinction in the region).

Riverlanders share an interest in the health of the River Murray. The Riverland region lies in the southern part of the Murray Darling Basin where the broad River Murray floodplain and its river meanders for approximately 400 kilometres (250 mi) through red sandy mallee dune landscapes. Several conservation reserves protect biodiversity and provide for conservation and wise use activities.

Protected area associated with the River Murray include Murray River National Park, Loch Luna Game Reserve and Moorook Game Reserve. Mallee landscape reserves include Chowilla Regional Reserve, Billiatt Conservation Park, Pooginook Conservation Park, Calperum Station and several privately owned reserves including Birds Australia's Gluepot Reserve. In the river valley, there are several hundred wetlands including two Ramsar wetlands of international importance — Banrock Station Wetland Complex and the Riverland Wetland that encompasses Chowilla floodplain, and other wetlands including Pike River basin, Gurra Gurra wetlands and Katarapko Creek.

== Media ==
=== Print ===
- The Murray Pioneer
- The River News
- The Loxton News

=== Radio ===
FM

- Faith FM – 87.6 FM
- Vision Christian Radio – 88.0 FM
- 5RM – 91.5 FM
- Magic 93.1 – 93.1 FM
- ABC NewsRadio – 93.9 FM
- TAB Racing Network – 95.5 FM
- Life FM Riverland – 100.7 FM & 88.5 FM (Waikerie, SA)
- triple j – 101.9 FM
- ABC Classic – 105.1 FM

AM

- 5RM – 801 AM
- ABC Riverland – 1062 AM
- ABC Radio National – 1305 AM
- KIX Country – 1557 AM

=== Television ===
- ABRS, the relay of ABC Television
- RTS, part of the WIN Network

== See also ==
- South Australian cuisine
- South Australian wine
- Riverland Paddling Marathon
- Riverland Football League
- Riverland wine region
- 1062 ABC Riverland
- Riverland Independent Football League
- Riverland Biosphere Reserve
- Riverland Mallee Important Bird Area
