= Paringa Bridge =

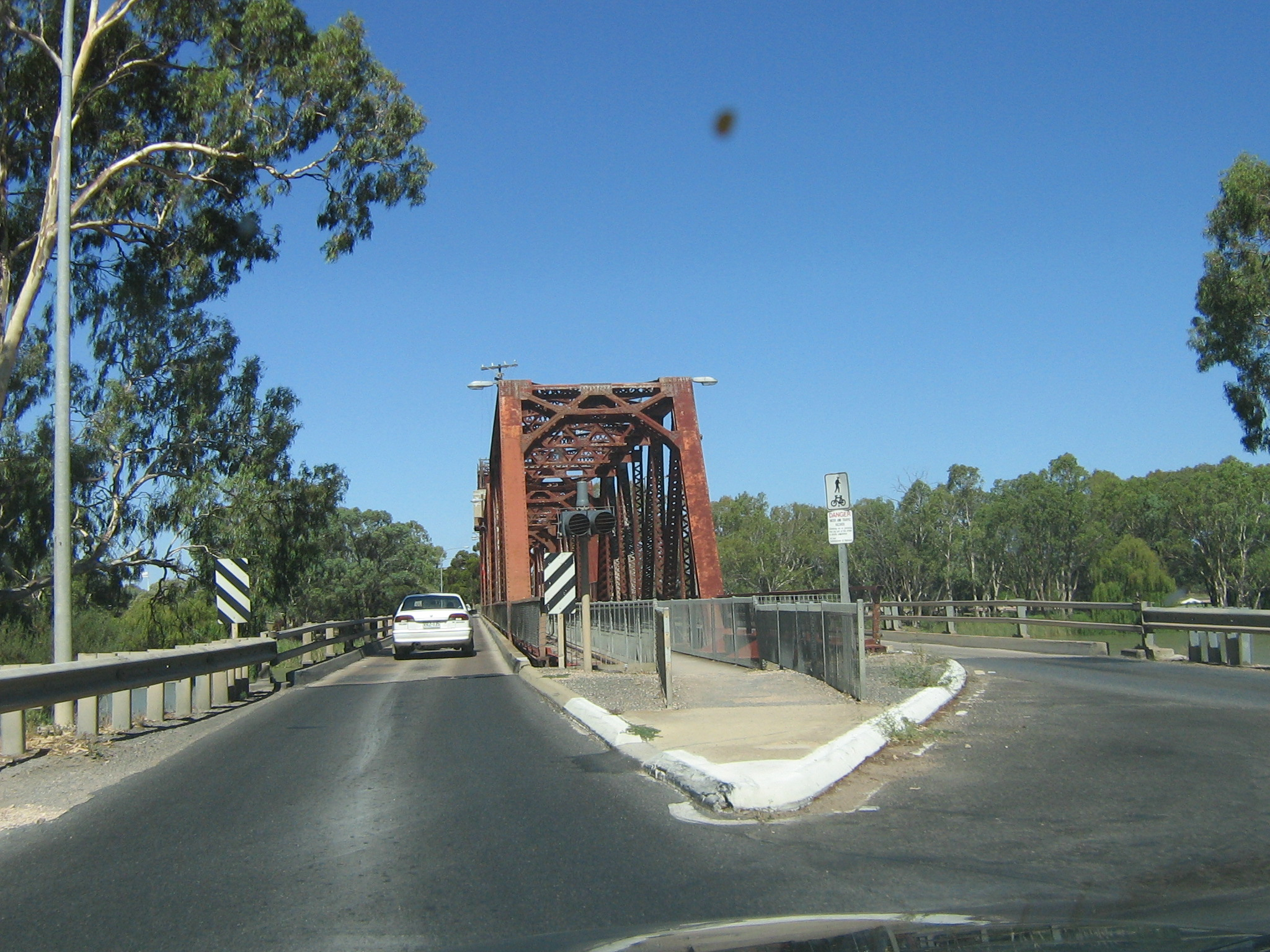
- Eastbound view in February 2006
- Coordinates: 34°11′S 140°47′E
- Carries: Barmera railway line (until 1982); Sturt Highway
- Crosses: Murray River
- Locale: Paringa, South Australia
- Maintained by: Department for Infrastructure & Transport

Characteristics
- Design: Vertical-lift
- Total length: 173 metres

History
- Opened: 31 January 1927
- Closed: 7 March 1984 (rail only)

Location
- Interactive map of Paringa Bridge

The Paringa Bridge carries the Sturt Highway across the Murray River in Paringa, South Australia. Until 1982, it also carried the Barmera railway line.

Designed by the South Australian Railways (SAR) and fabricated by Perry Engineering of Adelaide, the vertical-lift bridge opened on 31 January 1927. It was built as a road-rail bridge with both the Sturt Highway and Barmera railway lines using the same reservation. Maintenance costs were shared equally between the SAR and Highways department.

Subsequently, road lanes were added on either side to segregate the road and rail traffic. The last train crossed the bridge on 21 May 1982 with the line beyond Renmark formally closed on 7 March 1984. The railway tracks were removed in 1986 and the centre reservation converted to a shared pedestrian and cycle path.

As at September 2025, the vertical-lift span is opened twice a day for river traffic.
