= Paringa, South Australia =

Town in the Riverland of South Australia

Paringa
- Town
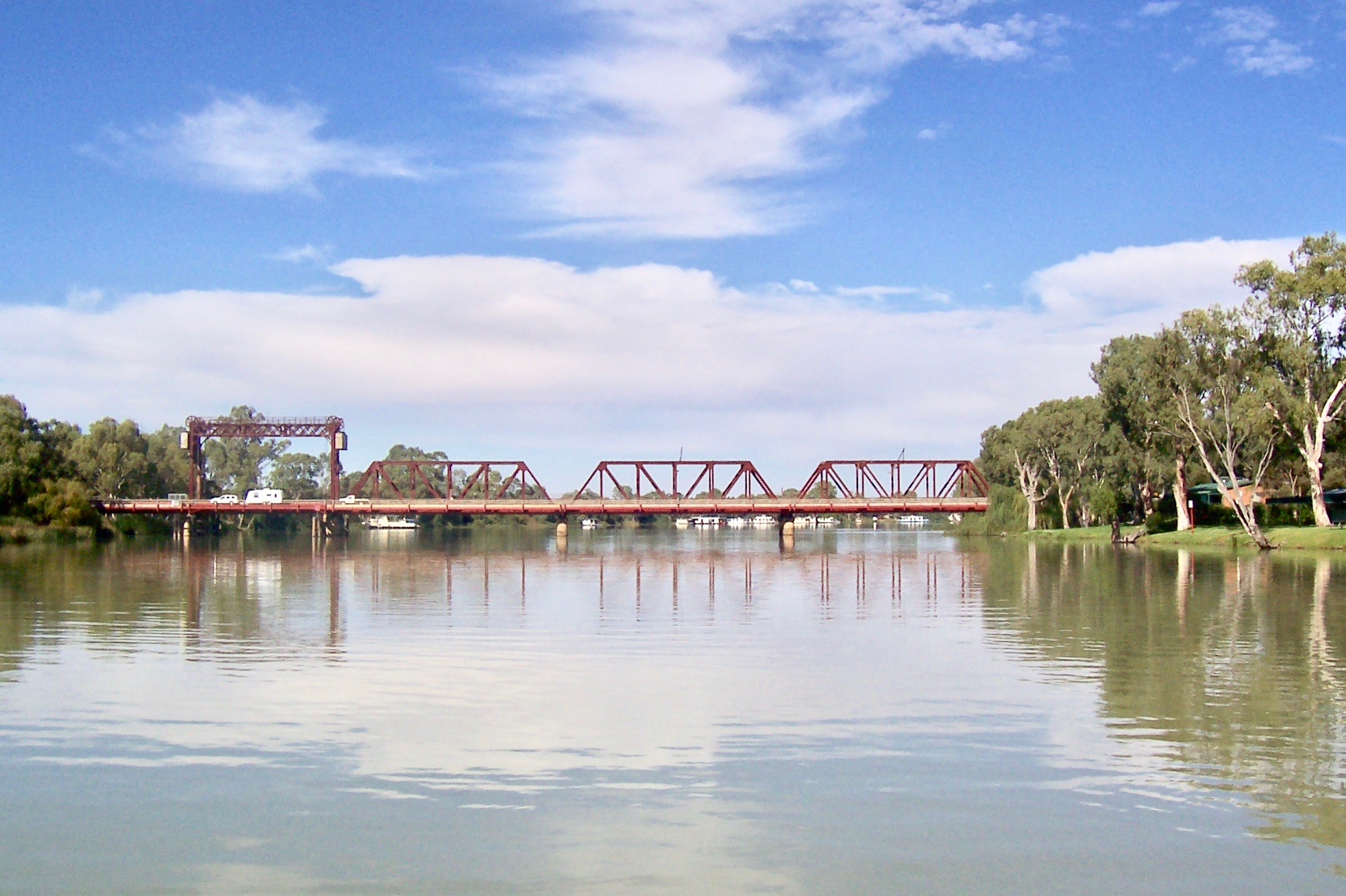
- Paringa bridge. The central route, which once carried trains, now provides a safe route for pedestrians and cyclists. One lane on each side of the central route carries road vehicles.

- Coordinates: 34°10′S 140°47′E
- Country: Australia
- State: South Australia
- LGA: Renmark Paringa Council

Government
  - State electorate: Chaffey
  - Federal division: Barker

Population
  - Total: 1,026 (UCL 2021)
- Time zone: UTC+9:30 (ACST)
  - Summer (DST): UTC+10:30 (ACDT)
- Postcode: 5340
- County: Alfred
Localities around Paringa
Renmark North		Murtho
Renmark	Paringa
Crescent	Mundic Creek	Wonuarra

Paringa is a small town in the Riverland of South Australia, 17 kilometres (11 miles) from the border with Victoria. It is known for its vineyards and almond, citrus and stone fruit orchards. Its main feature is a six-span bridge that crosses the River Murray. One of the spans can be raised to allow houseboats and paddle-steamers to pass underneath. (Note: The naming order "River Murray" is specified by the Government of South Australia.)

== Railway ==
Paringa was the terminus for 14 years of what eventually became the Barmera railway line – one of six lightly built lines that were built to encourage agricultural development in the Murraylands. Initially it extended 156 kilometres (97 miles) from Tailem Bend to Meribah, in the Brown's Well district, in mid-1913 as planned. Soon afterwards the line was extended 64 kilometres (40 miles) northwards to Paringa; the official opening took place on 3 October 1913. Fourteen years elapsed before the railway crossed the river to Renmark. By August 1928 the railway had been extended 34 kilometres (21 miles) to Barmera: 258 kilometres (160 miles) from Tailem Bend and 378 kilometres (235 miles) from Adelaide railway station.

The railway closed in 1990 but the bridge continues to carry the Sturt Highway as part of the main road link between Adelaide and Sydney.

The Paringa bridge was designed to carry a single railway line in the centre and a road lane on each side of it. It has a total of six spans, including one lift span to allow river traffic to pass underneath. It opened on 31 January 1927, enabling the railway to extend to Renmark. It is listed on the South Australian Heritage Register.

== The town today ==
Paringa today is a satellite town to the much larger Renmark, 4 kilometres (2.5 miles) upstream. Many new homes have been built there in recent years. It is a service centre for the large agricultural enterprises on the Murtho and Lindsay Point roads and has a pub, general store, museum and antiques shop. There is a riverfront picnic area adjacent to the bridge.

=== Governance ===
Paringa is within Renmark Paringa Council jurisdiction as a result of the District Council of Paringa amalgamating with Renmark Council in July 1996. The town had only one serving mayor, Alan Eckermann, before the amalgamation.

== See also ==
- List of crossings of the River Murray
- Paringa Paddock
