= Renmark, South Australia =

Town in South Australia

Renmark
- Town
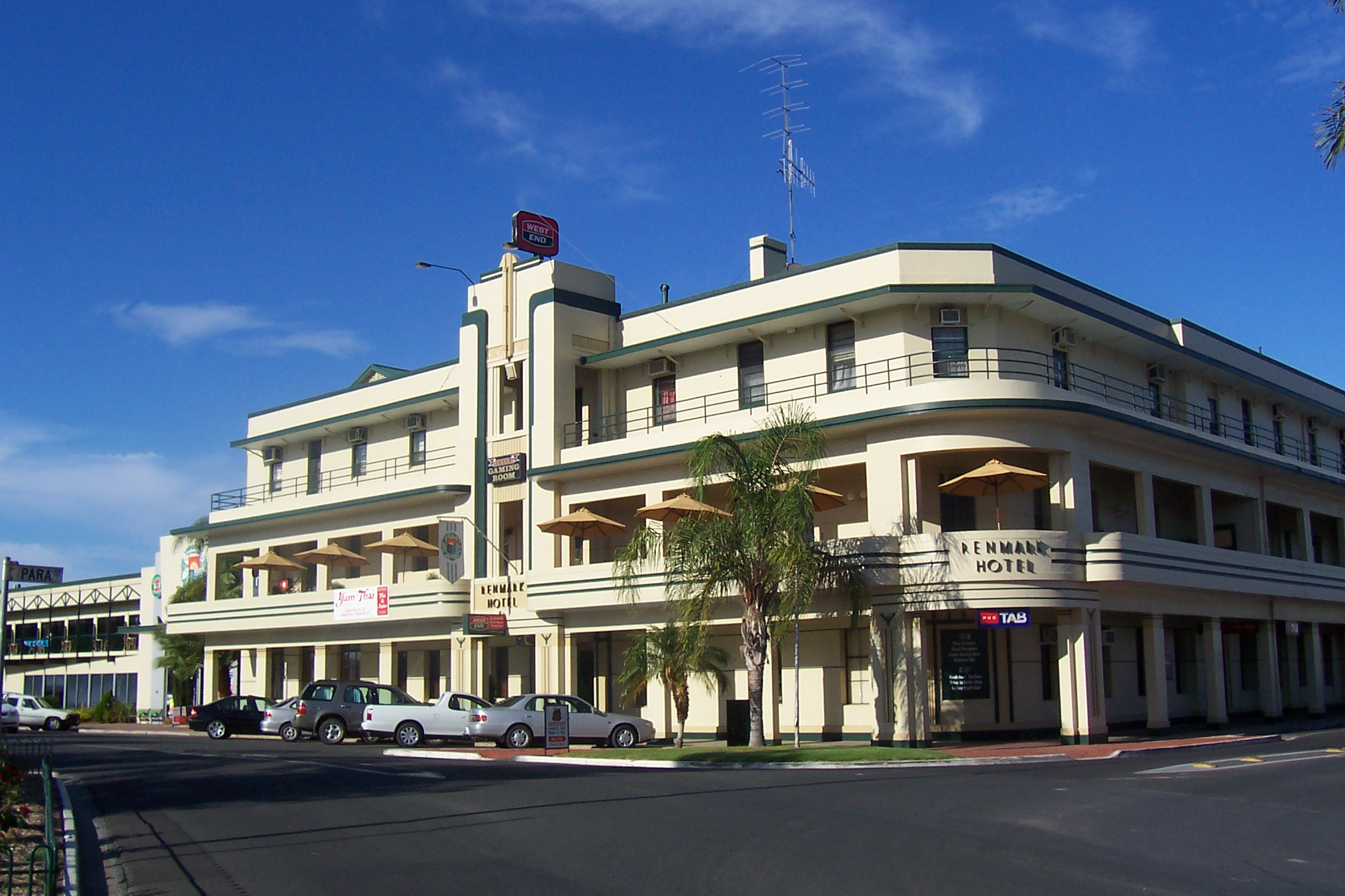
- The heritage-listed Hotel Renmark, located on Murray Avenue

- Coordinates: 34°10′27″S 140°44′30″E
- Country: Australia
- State: South Australia
- Region: Murray and Mallee
- LGA: District Council of Renmark Paringa
- Location: 254 km (158 mi) from Adelaide; 137 km (85 mi) from Mildura
- Established: 1904 (town); 16 March 2000 (locality)

Government
  - State electorate: Chaffey
  - Federal division: Barker
- Elevation: 31 m (102 ft)

Population
  - Total: 4,703 (UCL 2021)
- Postcode: 5341
- County: Hamley
- Mean max temp: 24.8 °C (76.6 °F)
- Mean min temp: 9.6 °C (49.3 °F)
- Annual rainfall: 243.7 mm (9.59 in)
Localities around Renmark
Renmark North; Renmark West	Renmark North	Renmark North; Paringa
Renmark West	Renmark	Paringa
Renmark West; Renmark South	Renmark South; Crescent	Paringa

Renmark is a town in South Australia's rural Riverland area, and is located 254 km (157.83 mi) northeast of Adelaide, on the banks of the River Murray. The Sturt Highway between Adelaide and Sydney runs through the town; Renmark is the last major town encountered in South Australia when driving this route. It is a few kilometres west of the SA–Victoria and SA–NSW borders. It is 31 m (101.71 ft) above sea level.

== History ==
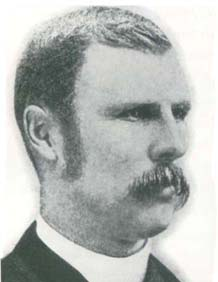
William Chaffey

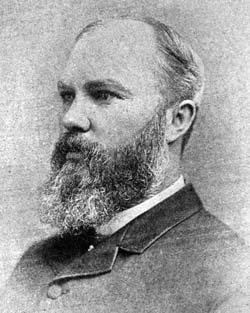
George Chaffey

It has been suggested that the name Renmark refers to a local Aboriginal word meaning "red mud" (the original inhabitants of the area were the Erawirung people). However, the mud at Renmark is not red. Alternatively, it could be derived from the name Bookmark, later Calperum, the station founded by the Chambers brothers, and developed by the Robertson brothers, from which 20,000 acres (8,100 ha) was excised by the Chaffeys for the town and irrigation project. Another possibility is the name of an early settler in the district, William Renny. Wool was shipped from "Renmark" in 1878, The first unambiguous use of the name (as "Renmark Flat") in newspapers was in November 1883.

Captain Charles Sturt was the first European to pass through the area in January 1830, as he navigated the length of the Murray River from the Great Dividing Range, eventually reaching Lake Alexandrina.

A settlement began to grow in 1887, when the Renmark Irrigation Settlement was established by George and William Chaffey, who created a system of open drains using water from the Murray River, (called Renmark Irrigation Trust) to allow orchards to be planted in the area. By pumping water onto the hot red sand, they transformed it into a fruit growing area similar to California. The Chaffey brothers' business collapsed in 1893, and the Renmark Irrigation Trust was created to manage the irrigation scheme.

Renmark was proclaimed a town in 1904 and a municipality in 1935.

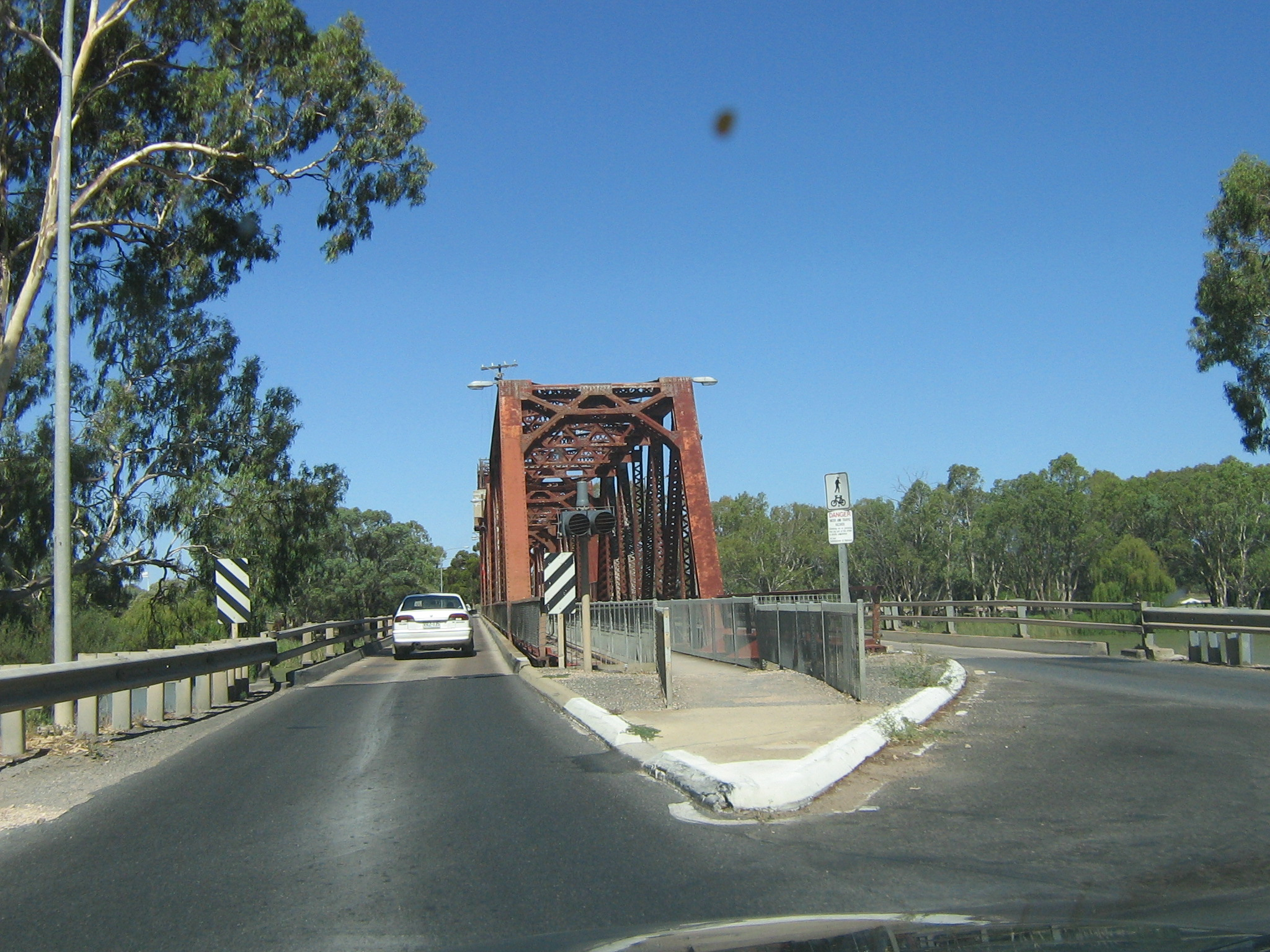
Paringa Bridge approach from Renmark showing where the railway used to cross between the road lanes

The Renmark Hotel was the first community-owned hotel in the British Empire and became the town's major landmark.

Renmark was connected to Adelaide by rail on 31 January 1927, when the railway line across the bridge to Paringa was opened. It was later extended west as far as Barmera and known as the Barmera railway line but then closed in 1983 then the last scheduled train to cross the bridge was on 31 December 1990.

== Demographics ==
In 2021, Renmark had a population of 4,703. The median age was 44 and 4.6% of residents were Aboriginal or Torres Strait Islander.

76.1% of residents are born in Australia, higher than the national average of 66.9%. The most common other countries of birth were India (4.4%), England (2.5%), and Greece (1.6%). The most common reported ancestries in Renmark are English (36.4%), Australian (35.5%) and German (11.1%). 61.4% of residents reported both parents being born in Australia, notably higher than the national average of 45.9%.

The top religious groups in Renmark were Catholic (11.3%), Anglican (8%) and Lutheran (6.3%). 41.4% stated no religion and 7.1% did not answer the question.

== Heritage listings ==
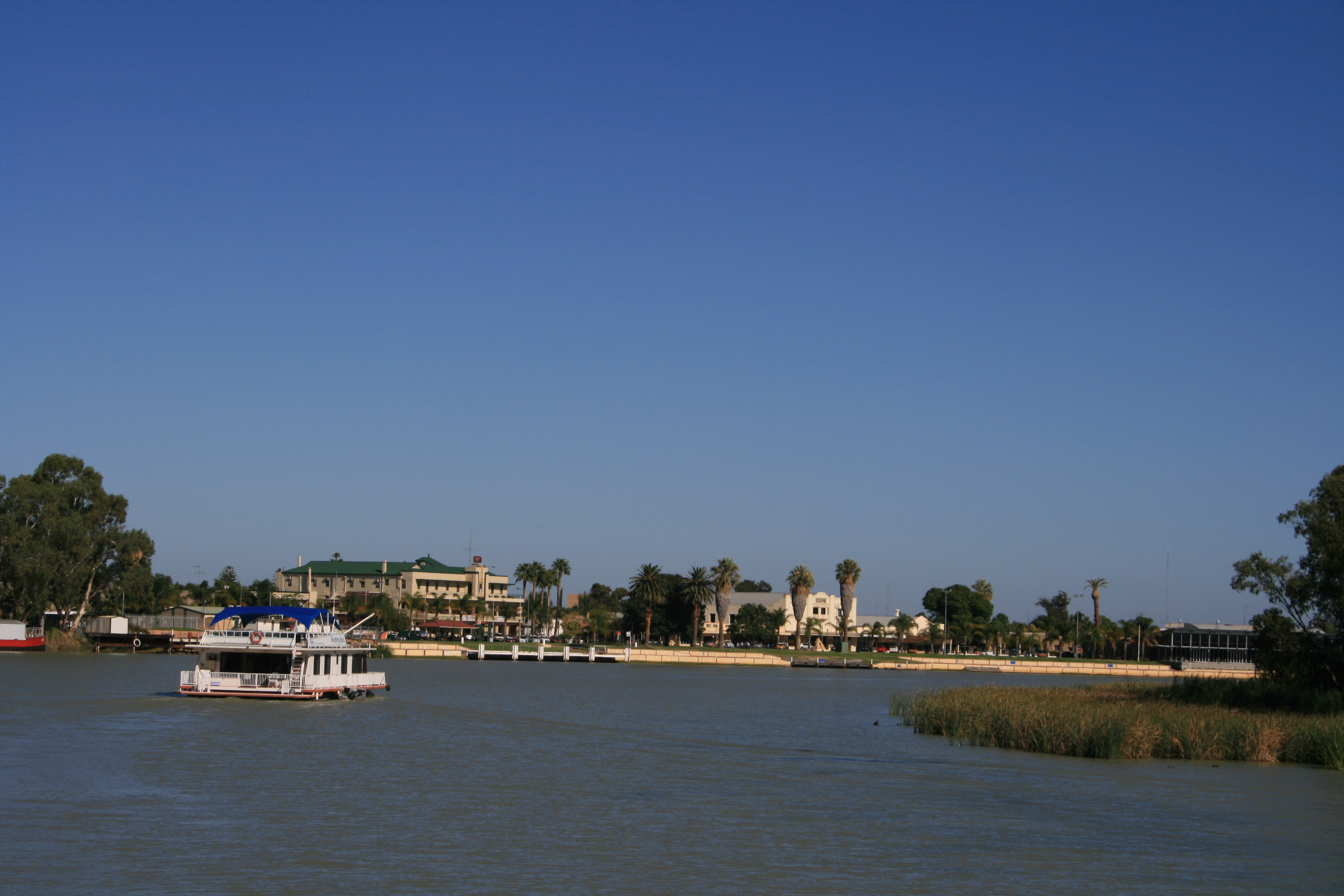
A view of Renmark from the Murray River.

Renmark has a number of heritage-listed sites, including:

- Murray Avenue: Renmark Hotel
- 149 Murray Avenue: Renmark Irrigation Trust Office
- 24 Ral Ral Avenue: Renmark Post Office
- Renmark Avenue: Renmark Distillery Bridge
- Renmark Avenue: Olivewood
- Sturt Highway: Paringa Bridge

== Governance ==
Renmark is located within the federal division of Barker, the state electoral district of Chaffey and the local government area of the Renmark Paringa Council.

== Tourism, industry and facilities ==
Renmark is a multicultural centre for the Riverland area. The river itself offers excellent spots for fishing, waterskiing and boating. The area is known for the cultivation of grapes, citrus fruits, tomatoes, vegetables, wheat and wool. Orange trees stretch for hectares as do vineyards and stone fruit orchards. Other industries include almond growing and pistachio nut cultivation.

Renmark is also home to the region's only restored paddle steamer, the P.S. Industry, wine companies and the rose industry. Renmark hosts the Renmark Rose Festival every October.

The town has their own shopping centre, Renmark Square, including shops such as Subway, The Reject Shop, Jeanswest, a number of community-owned businesses, and Big W and Woolworths serving as the anchors.

Many camping grounds are along the river, they are popular destinations for tourists in Renmark.

=== Murray River National Park ===
The Murray River National Park includes two locations near Renmark:

- Paringa Paddock (1,161 ha (2,870 acres)), including Goat Island, between Renmark and Paringa; and
- Bulyong, or Bulyong Island, on the west side of the river upstream from Renmark, accessible only by boat.

Paringa Paddock (which includes Goat Island) contains areas of riverine woodlands, wetlands and river flats. The floodplain is lined by huge river red gum (Eucalyptus camaldulensis) and river box (Eucalyptus largiflorens). The wetland complex provides habitat for koalas, birds and reptiles, and the park provides recreation for people of all ages and abilities. There are walking and biking trails developed by the Renmark Paringa Council and the local community. Bulyong is home to many wildlife species, such as western grey kangaroos, emus, pelicans, kingfishers and parrots.

== Media ==
The Murray Pioneer, a newspaper founded in 1892 as the Renmark Pioneer, is printed in Renmark.

Channels from the following television networks are available in Renmark:

- ABC Television (ABC)
- SBS Television (SBS)
- WIN Television (7, 9 & 10) as RTS-5A & LRS-34 relays the programming from Seven Network (Seven SA), Nine Network (Nine SA) & Network 10 (10 SA), Sky News Regional and Fox Sports News, with local commercials inserted

The Australian Broadcasting Corporation (ABC) broadcasts a local radio station, ABC Riverland (1062 AM), along with national stations ABC Radio National (1305 AM); ABC News Radio (93.9 FM); ABC Classic (105.1 FM) and Triple J (101.9 FM).

In addition, there are commercial radio stations, including 5RM (801 AM); KIX Country (1557 AM); Magic 93.1 (93.1 FM); Radio TAB (95.5 FM) and Riverland Life FM (100.7 FM).

== Transport ==
=== Air ===
Renmark Airport is located 6.8 km (4 mi) southwest of Renmark. However, there no scheduled flights to and from the airport. The nearest passenger airport is Mildura Airport, located 133 km (83 mi) east in the border of Victoria. Adelaide Airport is located 259 km (161 mi) south west of the town, which is 3 hours drive by car.

== Sport ==
Sporting teams

- Renmark Olympic (football)
- Renmark Rovers (Australian rules)
- Renmark Royals (cricket)

There is a speedway venue known as the Riverland Speedway, off the Sturt Highway to the southwest of the town (34°13′20″S 140°40′36″E). It holds stock car racing, sedans, sprint and speed cars. The 380 metres dirt oval speedway track has hosted numerous Australian Speedway Championships for both motorbikes and cars including the Australian Solo Championship, Australian Street Stock Championship and the Australian Sidecar Speedway Championship. It hosted the Australian Under-21 Individual Speedway Championship in 2009.

The town also is home to the Renmark Oval, a football ground featuring a seating capacity of about 5,000 people. It includes space for venues, and it is the home of the Renmark Rovers.

== Notable people ==
- Thomas Angove – a winemaker from Renmark, invented the process for packaging cask (box) wine, patented by his company on 20 April 1965.
- Gordon Bilney – politician
- Rob Bredl – documentary film maker
- Rick Burr – former Chief of Army
- John Cock – flying ace of the Second World War
- Syd Heylen – performer
- Rex Hobcroft – musician
- Ruby Hunter (1955–2010) – Aboriginal singer-songwriter and partner of Archie Roach, born on Goat Island
- John Percival Jennings – horticulturist
- Cecil Madigan – explorer and geologist
- Mark Mickan – AFL footballer
- Patricia Mickan – basketballer
- Bush poet and soldier Breaker Morant lived in the area in the 1890s, before serving in the Boer War. Confirmation of his employment at J. F. Cudmore's Paringa Station has not been found.
- Anne Ruston – politician
- Nicole Seekamp – basketballer
- Dean Semler – cinematographer
- Ross Story – politician
- Jack Wade – AFL footballer
- Pearl Wallace – also known as Captain Pearl Hogg, was Australia's first qualified woman riverboat skipper

== Climate ==
Renmark experiences a cold desert climate (BWk), bordering on a cold semi-arid climate (BSk) with hot, dry summers (though which are subject to cold fronts on account of the western longitude); warm to mild springs and autumns; and cool, sometimes cloudy winters. Renmark is surrounded by mallee scrub, and situated north of Goyder's Line.

Due to its geographical location, summers are several degrees hotter than those of Adelaide; although it has many more touches of frost in the winter, and it also lacks Adelaide's sizeable winter precipitation. The average rainfall of Renmark is 239.1 millimetres (9.4 in), peaking somewhat in spring; falling as thunderstorms and/or cold fronts in summer; cold fronts and Northwest cloudbands in winter, and a combination of the three in spring and autumn.

Extreme temperatures have ranged from 49.6 °C (121.3 °F) on 27 January 2026 to −6.1 °C (21.0 °F) on 18 June 1998 at the Aero site. Furthermore, on 5 January 2020, Renmark registered a new record low maximum of just 15.6 °C (60.1 °F) for any summer month; this extraordinarily low maximum was nearly four degrees lower than its previous January low maximum set back in 1983 at the old town site.

Climate data for Renmark Aero (1995–2026); 32 m AMSL; 34.20° S, 140.68° E
Month	Jan	Feb	Mar	Apr	May	Jun	Jul	Aug	Sep	Oct	Nov	Dec	Year
Record high °C (°F)	49.6 (121.3)	48.2 (118.8)	43.7 (110.7)	39.7 (103.5)	29.9 (85.8)	25.8 (78.4)	27.6 (81.7)	32.2 (90.0)	37.6 (99.7)	41.7 (107.1)	45.3 (113.5)	48.6 (119.5)	49.6 (121.3)
Mean daily maximum °C (°F)	33.9 (93.0)	32.6 (90.7)	29.1 (84.4)	24.6 (76.3)	20.0 (68.0)	16.8 (62.2)	16.5 (61.7)	18.5 (65.3)	22.0 (71.6)	25.4 (77.7)	28.8 (83.8)	31.3 (88.3)	25.0 (76.9)
Mean daily minimum °C (°F)	16.5 (61.7)	16.0 (60.8)	13.1 (55.6)	9.3 (48.7)	6.6 (43.9)	4.5 (40.1)	3.8 (38.8)	4.5 (40.1)	6.7 (44.1)	9.1 (48.4)	12.4 (54.3)	14.4 (57.9)	9.7 (49.5)
Record low °C (°F)	6.3 (43.3)	6.8 (44.2)	4.2 (39.6)	−1.6 (29.1)	−5.1 (22.8)	−6.1 (21.0)	−5.4 (22.3)	−5.6 (21.9)	−3.7 (25.3)	0.1 (32.2)	2.3 (36.1)	4.2 (39.6)	−6.1 (21.0)
Average precipitation mm (inches)	18.1 (0.71)	17.8 (0.70)	11.4 (0.45)	17.8 (0.70)	16.9 (0.67)	19.1 (0.75)	17.9 (0.70)	21.3 (0.84)	26.2 (1.03)	28.8 (1.13)	23.4 (0.92)	20.5 (0.81)	239.1 (9.41)
Average precipitation days (≥ 0.2 mm)	3.0	3.0	3.3	4.3	6.7	9.5	10.1	9.1	7.2	6.9	6.2	4.9	74.2
Average afternoon relative humidity (%)	22	25	29	34	44	52	51	42	37	29	26	24	35
Average dew point °C (°F)	5.3 (41.5)	6.6 (43.9)	6.0 (42.8)	5.2 (41.4)	5.8 (42.4)	5.6 (42.1)	4.6 (40.3)	3.1 (37.6)	3.5 (38.3)	2.3 (36.1)	3.4 (38.1)	4.2 (39.6)	4.6 (40.3)
Mean monthly sunshine hours	341.0	288.4	297.6	255.0	204.6	168.0	182.9	222.0	254.2	291.4	297.0	331.7	3,133.8
Source 1: Australian Bureau of Meteorology Renmark Aero
Source 2: Australian Bureau of Meteorology Mildura Airport (sunshine hours)

== See also ==
- 1956 Murray River flood
- River Murray Crossings
