= List of Murray–Darling steamboats =

This is a list of steamboats that have operated on the Murray-Darling–Murrumbidgee river system. It also includes several diesel-powered vessels built in the same tradition.

See also Murray-Darling steamboat people for more information on people mentioned in this article.

== Riverboats ==
Name	Description	Murray Service	Owners	Captains	Barges	Fate/Notes
Adelaide	106 tons	1866–now	J. C. Grassey & Partners; Grassey & Officer; Blair & McCrowther 1879; Murray River Sawmills 1901; R. Evans 1915	F. Pullar 1867, 1869–1871, 1875; Adams 1872; C. Schmedje sr, jr. 1879–1889; J. Krause 1881; Hoskins 1881; J. Dorey 1881; J. Newman 1883; W. Thomson 1890–1911; C. Anderson 1912–1939; R. Keir 1916	Echuca 1869; Redgum 1869; Moama 1869; Bendigo 1871; Eclipse 1872–1873; Moira 1873; Heather Bell 1878–1882; Border Chief 1879–1882; Shamrock 1879–1881; Gunbower 1879; Shamrock 1881; Swallow 1881; Pelican 1881; Federation 1881; Alice 1883	Oldest operable wooden hulled paddle steamer anywhere in the world. She was towing barges for the timber mill in 1947; Taken out of service 1960, then re-commissioned in 1985. Moored at Echuca.
Advance		1906–1909				Shuttled between Bourke and Louth. Was this vessel built from barge Advance?
Agnes	110 tons 85 ft × 10 ft.	1877–1888	Thos. Laing & Co. 1877–1880; J. Randell & D. Luttet 1880–1887; T. Freeman 1887–1888	J. Patterson 1877; D. Sinclair 1878, 1880; T. Laing 1879; T. Freeman 1879–1883; J. Symington 1879; F. C. Hansen 1880; M. Cole 1883, 1884	Rabbie Burns 1878–1881; Native Companion 1879; Darling 1880; Scottish Chief 1880–1883	Sold 1888 to Nagambie Steam Navigation and Saw-Mill Co. and removed to Nagambie on Goulburn River; replaced by Emma.
Albury	iron hull 120' × 16'; 60/156 tons 40/50 hp.	1855–	River Murray Navigation Co. Wallace & Other 1875; Johnston & Murphy 1880; Kirkpatrick & Harris 1879; Kirkpatrick 1881	E. Robertson 1855; R. Ross 1856; G. B. Johnston 1855–1875; J. Mace 1857; W. Barber 1860; T. Johnston 1864–1866; James Barclay 1870, 1871, :1874, 1875; W. Dickson 1873; Kopp 1875; J. M. Wallace 1875, 1877, 1878, :1880; G. Johnson 1881; J. Tait 1881–1883	Murrumbidgee 1855; Wakool 1855–1860; Goolwa 1856; Mitta Mitta 1857, 1859, 1860, 1874; Bogan 1866; Unknown 1866; J & M 1869, 1874, 1875; Menindie 1869; Miriam 1870–1875, 1879–1881	Sister ship to Gundagai. First to reach Town of Albury. Iron hull replaced with timber 1881.
Alert		1879–1937	George Blunt 1882; Blunt & Mason; McCulloch & Co. Permewan, Wright & Co. O. Searles 1937	G. Linklater 1879; C. Cowley 1879, 1880; T. Bynon c. 1880; R. Strang 1883–1899; R. F. Lewen 1898; G. Lindqvist 1899; G. Dorward jr. 1901; L. Strom 1905; H. Teschner 1905, 1906	Advance 1879; Willandra 1879; Canally 1880; Maori 1883–1891; Woorooma 1889; Jessie 1889, 1895, 1905, 1910; Nelson 1889, 1892, 1896, 1899; Paroo 1890, 1891; Horace 1891, 1905; Lancashire Witch 1891, 1896; Namoi 1892–1894, 1896–1898, 1905; Eagle 1892–1894, 1898; Tongo 1895; J.L.Roberts 1895, 1897, 1898, :1905, 1909; Confidence 1895–1896, 1898; Gunbower 1897; Echuca 1905; Moorara 1909	Involved in railway construction Narrandera 1882. Burnt to the waterline near Morgan 1937.
Alexander Arbuthnot		1923–1947; 1990–now	Arbuthnot Sawmills Pty Ltd.	H. Hogg 1942		Engaged in hauling redgum timber. Restored c. 1990 and serves as tourist vessel based at Echuca.
Alexandra		1904–1906	James Bell & Co. 1903; G. Ritchie	G. Ritchie 1904, 1906		Excursions out of Murray Bridge 1904–1906. Originally steamer Bantam; machinery and boiler incorporated into steamer Venus.
Alfred (see also Prince Alfred)	Iron side-wheeler 116 tons	1867–1917	A. Johnson 1869; A. Locke 1869; Risby 1890; Lush; Knox & Downs 1916	Reis 1867; M. Mack 1869–1876; Thomson 1876; J. Dorey 1877, 1880, 1881; J. Lawson 1878, 1879; O. Kenrick 1879; J. Krause 1881–1883; L. Searles 1890; R. Ransom 1912, 1913, 1915; G. M. Mumby 1917	Alice 1869–1872; Pocahontas 1878; Darling 1878–1879, 1881; Pelican 1878, 1881; Paroo 1879; Swallow 1879, 1884; Willandra 1879; Advance 1880–1881; Border Chief 1881; Pimpampa 1881; Swallow 1884; Uranus 1916, 1917	Sister ship to J.H.P. but side-wheeler. Had major refit 1890. Sank May 1917; crewman Thorn drowned; Mumby and mate charged with manslaughter, acquitted Later houseboat for W. Dodd.
Alma		1900–	SA Govt. Irrigation Dept.			Originally missionary boat Etona
Alpha "Murray Marvel"	50 tons	1899–	A. Francis; W. Collins 1908, 1923; H. Brennan −1911; S.A. Import Co. 1911–	A. Francis 1900–1902; H. Brennan 1911; W. Collins 1918–1923	Annie 1918; Emerald 1919	Light draught trading steamer with a reputation for sailing when no other could get through, she was largely built from wreck of Nil Desperandum. Mrs. Collins was engineer in 1918; In 1950 the Alpha was serving as a family home at Mannum.
Amphibious	60' × 18' iron hull 16 hp. twin screw, 49 tons	1876–1926	W. Warren 1876; D. McBeath 1879– Richard Craig 1902	W. Warren 1876; D. McBeath 1879; J. McBeath 1893		propelled by large Archimedean screws only part-submerged so they did not protrude below hull. Later converted to ketch.
Arbuthnot	100 hp.	1912–1913	Arbuthnot & Sons 1912–1913	W. F. Bailey; C. Johnson 1913	Koondrook 1913	Raced Canally 1913. Destroyed by fire. Raised and rebuilt by Capt. Arnold in 1916 and renamed J. G. Arnold. (see below.)
Arcadia	85' × 12'	1904–	W. Wolter 1904–1917	W. Wolter 1904–1917		Served as excursion steamer on lower Murray and lakes Albert and Alexandria.
Ariel	83 tons	1868–1899?	Hardman & Lester 1876; Herbert Lester 1877; W. R. Randell 1878	R. Anderson 1868–1875; Parker 1869; Wallace 1876; C. Bock 1876–1879, 1892, 1896; E. H. Randell 1880–1882; F. C. Hansen 1881; Anderson 1893, 1894; W. Porter 1896	Ariel 1868–1876; Bogan 1873; Goolwa 1874–1875; Hartley 1879–1892; Alice 1882; Rosa 1896	Trading steamer purchased with barge Ariel by Hardman & Lester 1876; William Frank Hardman became insolvent 1877 and was bought out by Herbert Lester. Rebuilt as steamer Kelvin 1912.
Australien		1897–1926	W. Wilson 1897–1905; F. O. Wallin 1906–1933; King & Jones 1934–	W. Wilson 1897–1904; W. Carlyon 1901; W. Knight 1902; Fordyce 1905; F. O. Wallin 1905, 1906, 1908; T. Kelly 1910–1912, 1918	Vega 1911, 1918, 1932; Federal 1920; Zulu 1906, 1918, 1920; J.L. Roberts 1933	Chinese cook Jimmy Ah Kee drowned 1901. Last served as logging steamer above Yarrawonga weir. (Mudie p. 164); In 1934 she brought construction materials to Yarrawonga, the first boat from South Australia in 20 years. She was there purchased for King Bros. of Mulwala for carrying timber.
Avoca	148 tons	1877–	Oliver & Thomson 1877; Alec Thomson 1886; J. G. Arnold c. 1920– D. Treacy 1939, 1947; Collins Bros. 1950	W. Miers 1879–1882; D. Treacy 1939, 1948		Sunk near Wilcannia 1878. Left river for Spencer Gulf trade c. 1890 for J. Darling & Co. Returned to Murray c. 1920 to cart stone (Mudie p. 191) and occasional "rough" tourist trips. Sunk at Mildura in 2014.
Bantam		1883–	R. F. Lewen 1883–1901; G. Ritchie 1903	R. F. Lewen 1883–1901	Paragon 1883–1896, 1903	First on upper Murray to employ electric light. Converted to barge Alexandra 1903; Became steamer Alexandra (see above)
Barwon		1886–	Permewan, Wright and Co. Gem Navigation Co. 1909–	A. De Forest 1886; P. Westergaard 1887–1893; J. Innes c. 1888 (Mudie p. 179); C. Johnson 1888, 1899; W. Carlyon 1897; G. Robson 1898, 1904, 1906; D. Nutchey 1905, 1906; A. Dusting 1908; H. Teschner 1908; G. McLean 1909; B. Atkins 1910; W. F. Bailey 1910; P. Sandford 1910; W. R. F. Hanckel 1910; R. Potter 1911; Haines 1912, 1913; Rice 1914; J. Nutchey 1916; H. McLean 1912, 1916; H. Treacy 1924	Victory 1886, 1894; Sprite 1886–1890, 1892; Horace 1886–1888, 1892, 1897–1898; Jessie 1887–1889, 1891–1894, 1897; Nelson 1888–1892, 1894, 1898; Maori 1889, 1893, 1896, 1901, :1907, 1908; Blue Bell 1890, 1898; Woorooma 1891–1892, 1896; Lancashire Witch 1892, 1897, 1898; Diamantina 1892; Paroo 1893, 1894, 1897, 1898; Confidence 1896; J.L. Roberts 1898; Pimpampa 1901; Sarah Jane 1901; Ormond 1907; Mary 1908; Emily 1909, 1913; Nonpareil 1909; Hartley 1910; Mallara 1910; Alice 1910; Moorara 1913; Florence Annie 1913; Emerald 1912;1914, 1916, 1920	Barwon was originally barge White Rose (consort of Riverina) sunk in 1884, lengthened and renamed 1886. Barge Blue Bell destroyed by fire January 1898; Barge Maori sunk near Hay 1907; Still in service 1924, carrying gravel. (Barwon was also the name of the interstate coastal freighter at the centre of the 1928 seamen's strike.)
Beechworth	105' 2 × 85 hp	1865–1867	Smith & Banks 1865–1867	Reis 1866; J. Smith 1865–1867	Wangaratta 1866	Sunk 1866, destroyed by fire January 1867 while moored at Echuca. Harry Payne bought the wreck and much of her structure was incorporated into the Corowa or Jane Eliza. (Mudie p. 223); Replaced by Jane Eliza.
Bejo perhaps "B.J.O."		1953				see Eric
Black Swan						see Nil Desperandum
Blanche	48 tons	1869–1887	Swannell & Wallace; Whyte, Counsell & Co. 1875, 1879; W. Bowring 1908; P. McLaren 1908	J. Wallace 1869–1875; J. Grundy 1877; W. Stewart 1875–1877; G. Pybus 1880	Morning Star 1874–1876; Livingstone 1875; Howlong 1876–1877	mail steamer
Bogan	wood hull, 53 tons	1860–1869	W. R. Randell	J. Johnstone; D. Bower 1861; J. Wallace 1864; W. R. Randell 1864–1869; R. Anderson possibly 1868, 1869 (Mudie p. 80)	Goolwa 1864, 1866	Originally barge, converted back to barge c. 1870.
Bourke	110' × 20' 6" 153 tons	1876–1896	A. H. Landseer 1876–1881	J. Wallace; G. Pickhills 1876–1878, 1880; J. Grundy 1891–1896	Empress 1877, 1879, 1881, 1882, :1887, 1893; Hilda 1893; McIntyre 1894	Raced against rowing four 1880; Last used as excursion steamer. Perhaps converted to barge Bourke c. 1898, (there was an earlier barge of that name or perhaps "Burke"), escort of Tarella, then successively a floating cold storage and butcher's shop behind Queen based in Renmark.
Brewarrina	28 tons 50 ft. × 12 ft.	1877–1908	Thomson & Ritchie; Thompson, Vaughan & Co. 1879; W. M. Fehon; G. White 1890; E. Rich & Co. –1907; Permewan, Wright 1907–	J. Gribble 1877–1880,1886 (Mudie p. 92); G. White 1890–1897; G. Grundy 1893; C. Cowley 1893; Olsen 1903? H. Payne 1904	Walgett 1877, 1878, 1885, 1887, :1896, 1897; Darling 1891; Golconda 1896–1897; Trader 1908	Centre of riot when carrying strike-breakers during shearers' strike 1891. Stuck on the Bundabareena rocks 1903. Reached Mungindi in July 1893 (Mudie).
Britannia	125' × 24'	1884–1888	Tonkin, Fuller & Martin	L. Searles 1888		Converted from barge Britannia with boiler and machinery from steamer Queen. Burnt at Craigie's Creek near Bookmark and Bookpurnong stations. Crewman John McKenny was badly burned.
Bunyip (1)	106' 14 tons	1858–1863	W. R. Randell; Randell & Scott; Robs & Purchas 1879	J. Lindsay 1858 (Mudie p. 199); W. R. Randell 1858, 1859, :1861–1863; E. H. Randell 1859–1861		Bunyip originally had twin hulls, with the paddle-wheel amidships, and an auxiliary screw at the bow for steering. The ship's cook and a passenger were lost overboard 1860. Bunyip was converted to a single-hull stern-wheeler around this time, and rated 200 tons. She was destroyed by fire near Chambers's station at Chowilla, Five died in the fire or were drowned. The spot was later named Bunyip Reach.
Bunyip (2)	46' 10 ton	1877–1889		H. Dewing 1878; J. Symington 1880; J. Nash 1882, 1883; Davis 1885–1886; S. McBurney 1889		Reached Seymour, Victoria, on the Upper Goulburn, in 1878. (Mudie p. 90); Stuck in Darling 1885–1886
Burrabogie	80/95 tons 110 ft. × 16' 6".	1874–1885	Hay Steam Navigation Co. 1874–1878; McCulloch & Co. 1879–	E. Fowler 1874; J. Ritchie 1874–1877; G. Lindqvist 1877–1884	Pimpampa 1874, 1875, 1882; Willandra 1875–1879, 1882; Tongo 1879–1880; Darling 1880, 1881; Gwydir 1881; Namoi 1881, 1883; Federation 1881; Border Chief 1882; Eagle 1884; Paroo 1885	Sunk at Hay 1880; left for Gippsland Lakes 1885. Sister ship to Corrong. The name "Burrabogie" was applied to a barge c. 1889.
Cadell See also steamer Francis Cadell below.	126' × 20'	1876–	G. B. Johnston 1876; G. Johnston & Co. 1883; D. Ritchie 1922	G. B. Johnston 1878; W. Dickson 1879, 1880, :1883, 1884; R. Johnson 1880; J. Ritchie 1923, 1925	Isabel 1878; Monarch 1879–1881, 1886, 1887; Granite 1923–1924	Her hull was launched 1876 and she was used as a barge until 1878 when her engine was fitted. Johnston's brother Peter died after falling into paddlebox 1881. Frequently crossed Murray mouth. She lay derelict on a Port Pirie beach until purchased by D. Ritchie and returned to the Murray. (Mudie p. 194) by 1925 she was described as J. Ritchie's "flagship".
Canally	92' 100 hp.		Tinks 1919–1925; T. Freeman −1920 (S.A. buyer) 1920– Francis & Tinks 1924	T. Freeman 1912–1916, 1918; F. Weaver 1924	T. F. 1918, 1920	Dubbed "Greyhound of the Rivers", she raced Arbuthnot 1913. Made record time Balranald to Echuca 1915 sold 1934 then 1941. Converted to barge; carried wood blocks from Yielima. Now undergoing restoration at Mannum; Her four-tone steam whistle was later used at the Mildura packing shed.
Canberra		1916–				Refurbished by Hilary Hogg in 1953 as a tourist vessel out of Renmark. Restored in 2003 and serves as tourist vessel out of Echuca, Victoria.
Captain Sturt	Iron hull	1916–1938	River Murray Commission	G. Johnston 1916, 1919, :1923, 1925; E. Orchard 1926		Built by Washington Meredith, an American. Unique in pushing barges (four or more, loaded with stone from quarry at Mannum) ahead of her. Used for Lock 8 in 1932. Became houseboat at Goolwa in 1946. In 1997 the upper decks were removed and the hull used at the centre of Goolwa's Captain Sturt Marina, where the paddle wheel is still visible.
Cato	iron hull	1883–	J. Nash & G. Curson 1883– E. Rich & Co. –1907; Permewan, Wright 1907–	J. Nash 1883–1889; D. Cremer 1896, 1897; E. E. Dodd 1897, 1898	Albemarle 1896–1908; Livingstone 1897; Trader 1898	Helped rescue people stranded by floods at Bourke 1890.
Charlotte			Henry Butler; Rhoda Singh			Hawking steamer
City of Oxford	70' × 11'	1890–1915	C. Cantwell 1890– T. Goode 1903; R. Singh 1909; H. Mackenzie 1909; R. Singh 1910 (again!)	C. Cantwell 1890; C. Johnson 1890, 1894; J. Lyons 1891; D. Sinclair 1894; R. Singh 1909	Union 1898; Undaunted 1904	Originally L'Orient, lengthened by 22', she was designed to operate in shallow waters. Became a hawking steamer operating between Morgan and Renmark. Struck cliff and sank 1909 at Qualco, and again in 1911. She struck a snag near the S.A. border in 1915, and though refloated and repaired did little subsequent work.
Clara	79 tons	1876–1880	W. Beams & Co. 1879; James Johnston 1880	L. Searles 1877, 1878		Collided with Despatch 1878; Burnt to the waterline 1880 while laid up and being advertised for sale; she was insured for more than the asking price.
Clyde			Permewan, Wright & Co. W. Wilson; F. O. Wallin 1909–	W. Wilson 1888–1895; W. F. Bailey 1897; Johnson 1899; Olson 1901, 1902; Permewan, Wright & Co. –1909; F. O. Wallin 1909–	Annie 1890; Zulu 1890, 1895	Built from barge Result (Mudie p. 160); Engineer James Quinn died September 1907 from injuries after getting clothing caught by the engine shaft. Acquired by Wallin 1909 in exchange for Oscar W.
Colonel		1894?–	F. O. Wallin 1918	J. Innes 1896–1899; H. Teschner 1903–1906; W. F. Bailey 1905; E. Orchard 1923; G. Alexander 1924; A. E. Workman 1924, 1925; C. Cantwell 1924; W. Henderson 1926; L. McLean 1927; C. Haines 1933	Jessie 1895, 1906, 1908, 1910, 1911; Maori 1895–1899, 1903, 1905; Woorooma 1896; Sarah Jane 1900; T.P. 1901; Lancashire Witch 1905; Gunbower 1906; J.L. Roberts 1906, 1910–1912; Echuca 1907; Namoi 1908, 1912; Vega 1918; Uranus 1920; Emerald 1923; Hartley 1924; Loxton 1924; Ukee 1925; Kulnine 1926–1927; Crowie 1928; Moorabin 1928, 1929	Barge Maori sunk 1897 near Yarrawonga, blocking the river.
Colonel Light		1922–				Weekly run for Renmark fruit growers
Colonial						Delivered boiler 1926 Perhaps typo for Colonel.
Coonawarra	110', 225 ton	1950–	Murray Valley Coaches Ltd.	H. Hogg 1950; L. Telley 1951; R. McGraw 1952; L. Wagner		Conversion by Charles Felshaw from barge J.L. Roberts (built 1911 in Echuca) as Murrumbidgee II. Incorporated shaft from Murrumbidgee and paddlewheels from Excelsior. Subject of Judith Crossley song Coonawarra has three shadows.
Corio	83 tons	1857	River Murray Steam Navigation Ltd.	B. Germein 1857		"The screw steamer Corio was bought for £4,200, to run from Port Adelaide to Goolwa, but after a number of trips she was stranded inside the mouth, and was abandoned."
Corowa	composite hull stern-wheeler, 98' × 19' 8" 182 tons	1868–	Smith & Banks 1868; Murray & Jackson; E. H. Randell 1871– Chaffey Brothers; J. Tait 1892– Gem Navigation Co. 1909–	A. Peirce 1868, 1869; J. Thompson 1870; E. H. Randell 1871; E. C. Randell 1873–1876, 1880; W. R. Randell 1876; A. E. Randell 1885, 1886; J. Tait 1890–1895; Hart 1895; H. W. King 1897; J. Nutchey 1899, 1907, 1909, 1912; Tinks 1905, 1908; G. McLean 1907; G. Alexander 1911–1913, 1919; E. Orchard 1912, 1921; G. A. Thamm 1913; S. Rossiter 1914; W. Freeman 1923; L. Mewett 1923, 1924	Paika 1871, 1912; Eclipse 1875; Mary Ann 1884; Emerald 1901, 1907, 1921; Paragon 1905; Susan 1907; Empress 1907, 1910, 1912; Isabel 1907; Pearl 1907; Nonpareil 1907, 1908; Myee 1910; Alice 1910; Radia 1912; Emily 1914; Moorara 1914; Crowie 1919; Ukee 1919; Hartley 1919; Loxton 1921; Wollara 1921; Uranus 1922	Replacement for Lady Darling, and using some of her materials.(Mudie p. 73); Randell disposed of her in Adelaide 1876; Stuck in upper reaches of Darling 1880, 1881. and 1885, 1886
Corrong	30 hp 60/87 tons	1874	Hay Steam Navigation Co. 1874–1879; McCulloch & Co. 1879–	J. W. Ritchie 1874, 1876; H. Theisz 1875–1879; W. Pullar 1880–1882; Johnson 1882, 1883; M. Cole 1883, 1884; T. Freeman 1884–1886; J. Page 1885; J. Patterson 1887; G. Lindqvist 1887–1888, :1890–1892,1894 (Mudie p, 139),1896; J. Dickson 1888, 1889; J. Innes 1888; A. Dusting 1896; H. Teschner 1897, 1898	Moira 1870, 1874; Willandra 1875; Pimpampa 1875, 1876, 1878, 1879; Swallow 1879–1881; Pelican 1879; Federation 1880–1881; Namoi 1881, 1889, 1890; Advance 1882; Shamrock 1882; Horace 1882, 1885–1886, 1891; Jessie 1883–1884, 1897; Victory 1886, 1887; Nelson 1886; Paroo 1888, 1891; Confidence 1888, 1891, 1897; Gunbower 1890; Eagle 1891	Perhaps named for Corrong station on the Lachlan; she was sister ship to the Burrabogie. Bargehand William England lost overboard 1874.
Culgoa	composite stern-wheeler 30 hp, 79 tons	1865–1868 :1871–1872	Acraman, Main, Lindsay, & Co. Murray & Jackson	A. Sunman 1865–1871; W. Parker 1870, 1871; W. Barber 1872	Darling 1865–1866; Hume 1869, 1871–1872, 1878	Snagged and sunk 1865. A. Sunman and Culgoa also worked between Gulf St Vincent ports out of Port Wakefield 1869–1871.
Cumberoona (1)	108' × 20' 142 tons 60 hp.	1866–1889	J. Whyte 1866; Whyte, Counsell & Co. 1879	J. Mace 1866–1869; C. Hill 1869; Adamson 1870; E. Barnes 1870–1872, 1876; W. Barber 1873–1875; G. Pybus 1881, 1883–1887; Adams 1879	Howlong 1868–1874, 1883; Livingstone 1874, 1879; Stanley 1876, 1881; Morning Star 1876; Goolwa 1879	Snagged and sunk on maiden voyage. Collided with Wahgunyah 1869; Mace was found culpable and had his master's certificate suspended for 12 months. Stuck in Darling 1885–1886. Sunk at Christmas Rocks (between Wilcannia and Menindie) 1889.
Cumberoona (2)	steel hull side-paddles 25m.	1986–				3/4 replica built at Albury 1985 as Bicentennial project designed by Warwick Hood.
Daisy	52' × 11' 20 tons	1896–1906	R. S. McLeod 1905	Wilson 1904; T. Edwards 1912; Mine Family 1945 1948 when sunk.		Hawking steamer, still afloat in 1942.
Davis				W. O. Searles 1926		
Decoy	93' × 18'	1878–1902 :1911–	H. B. Hughes 1878– G. Ritchie; J. Whyte; Murray Shipping Ltd. John Darling & Son 1902; Gem Navigation Co. 1909–	E. Fowler 1878; E. Baron 1878, 1881, 1885, 1886; T. Johnston 1881; J. Kerr 1889, 1898; W. Sandey 1892–1894; G. Grundy 1900; R. Potter 1912; E. Orchard 1923; V. Byrne 1924; W. Henderson 1924; L. Mewett 1924–1927; A. Price 1926; W. H. Drage 1928	Reliance 1879–1881, 1883, :1890–1893, 1897, 1902; Croupier 1881, 1884, 1889, 1895, 1899; Uranus 1890, 1896; Bourke 1898; Mallara 1910, 1911, 1927; Murchison 1911; Hartley 1911; Nonpareil 1911; Ukee 1912; Cobar 1918; Emerald 1921; Moorabin 1921, 1923; Loxton 1924; Crowie 1924, 1925, 1927; Kulnine 1926	Brought out from Scotland in sections and built in Melbourne, originally designed to burn coal, modified for wood 1878. Later owned by John Whyte; Purchased by John Darling 1902 to work Gulf St Vincent with barge Reliance. then served as passenger vessel on Swan River 1905–1909 then purchased by George Ritchie and returned to the Murray. In 1925 the barge Crowie towed by Decoy carried a record 2,493 bales of wool. Became a houseboat.
Dione		1894, 1895		Rev. W. Corly Butler		Twin screw ex-SA Police launch bought by Rev. Butler for missionary work among Village Settlements; renamed Glad Tidings.
Dispatch	117 tons 111' long	1877–	A. H. Landseer 1877; T. C. Goode –1909	J. Tait 1877; J. Wallace 1879, 1882, 1885; T. C. Goode 1908		Built as mail steamer on the Lower Lakes. Snagging duties 1910
Despatch				G. Grundy 1910; W. R. F. Hanckel 1911		
Dora	29' × 10', 5.6 tons, 2 hp.	1884–	J. Wrench & Macpherson 1884; Matthews 1886; John Ware 1890			Hawking vessel
Duke of Edinburgh		1868–	Tonkin & Fuller	B. M. Fuller 1868–1874; Bruce 1870–1872		Light draught steamer worked between Milang and Wentworth.
E.R.O.			Renmark Irrigation Trust; Cuttle & Ogilvy 1918; W. Collins 1923	Randell 1917; J. Nutchey 1917–1921	Alice 1917–1925	named for E. R. Olorenshaw, founding chairman of the Renmark Irrigation Trust. Delivered Renmark punt (Captains Randell and Nutchey) 1917.
Echuca	iron hull	1865–				
Edwards	85' × 16', 78 tons	1875	J. Laing 1875–1879; J. Lawrence & Son 1888– J. Webb 1903; R. J. Evans (Evans Brothers) 1907	S. Williams 1875–1883; J. Laing 1875–1879; W. Sugden 1881; A. Dusting 1882; J. Newman 1882; A. Ebery 1882, 1883; C. Morton 1886; J. Lyons 1887; G. Cole 1888, 1889; J. Webb 1903, 1905; R. Keir 1911; P. Evans 1918; Dean 1932; J. Foster 1939; R. McGraw 1950	Rabbie Burns 1875–1877; Federation 1876; Blue Bells 1878–1883, 1887; Benduck 1879; Whaler 1921; Impulse 1950	Barge sunk 1883; Converted for irrigation purposes 1888; Idle 1902, then restored for general cargo 1903; Associated with Barmah sawmill, 80 km upstream from Echuca, carrying logs and sawn timber from 1907.
Elfie		1880–		Perry 1892; Gribble 1892; L. Searles 1894; C. Payne 1896; F. Wolter 1897, 1898	Cutty Sark 1896–1897	Originally a barge behind Kelpie, then set up for scouring wool. Deckhand Alfred Salmon burned to death when deck caught fire 1892; Captain Perry mysteriously disappeared 1892, found dead. Chinese cook murdered deckhand 1894
Elizabeth	90 tons	1872–	J. Mackintosh; Mackintosh Sawmill Co. 1888; Murray River Sawmill Co.	E. Fowler 1873, 1874; D. Bower 1874–1876; C. Hill 1878, 1879; C. King 1879; L. Strom 1883, 1885, 1886, 1888, :1892, 1893, 1899–1901, 1908; W. Carlyon 1893	John Campbell 1878, 1885; Tongo 1878; Scottish Chief 1876, 1878–1879; Premier 1886; Confidence 1893	
Ellen	134 tons 125 ft. × 19' 6 in.	1877–1930	Shetliff & Co. H. King & Co. 1909; Gem Navigation Co. 1909– Murray Shipping Ltd. 1919, 1923	S. Shetliff jr. 1883–1886; A. Matulick 1885; W. Miers 1890, 1891; Hart 1895, 1896; H. W. King 1905; W. Tinks 1906, 1909; C. Payne c. 1910; Bob Smith 1910, 1911; G. McLean 1911; G. Alexander 1912; E. Orchard 1913; V. Byrne 1920; C. Cantwell 1921; J. Haynes 1923; L. McLean 1923	Paragon 1905, 1906; Pearl 1906; Isabel 1906, 1909, 1912; Empress 1909, 1910; Queen 1910; Hartley 1910; Susan 1917; Albemarle 1917; Ukee 1917; Paika 1917; Cobar 1918	Originally barge Ellen, launched 1876. Stuck in Darling 1885–1886; Sold to Joseph Johnson of Port Wakefield in 1887, but returned to Mildura with George Chaffey's pumps in December 1888. Sank near Euston in 1923; Destroyed by fire 1930.
Emily Jane (1)	58 tons 70' 9" × 13' 2"	1875–1882	T. Buzza 1875–1882	E. Fowler 1875, 1876; T. Buzza 1877, 1880; S. Fowler 1878 (Mudie p. 91); J. Dickson 1878–1880; J. Lyons 1881; C. Evans 1881; F. C. Hansen 1881; E. Barnes 1882	Energetic 1876; Wyuna 1878–1882, 1886, 1887; Goulburn 1879–1882; Gunbower 1881; Native Companion 1883	Named for Buzza's daughter. First steamer to reach Shepparton, Murchison; and Seymour; In 1882 Buzza announced his intention to convert her to log barge and her engine to be installed in White Swan.
Emily Jane (2)		1882–1899	T. Buzza 1882–1893; W. Bowring −1899	T. Buzza 1882–1887; S. Williams 1891; W. Bowring 1894, 1899	Wyuna 1887; Paika 1899	Possibly the White Swan renamed (see below). Destroyed by fire with huge losses Christmas 1899 then broken up.
Emma	iron hull, 25 hp.	1885–	T. Freeman 1885– W. Keir 1887, 1888; Davie, Price & Co.	T. Freeman 1885, 1886; A. De Forest 1886; W. Keir 1887, 1888; F. Kerridge 1890–1892	Sarah Francis 1886; Union 1899; Eagle 1930; Chime 1912; Annie 1903, 1906, 1912–1913, :1916, 1918	Light draught steamer built after style of Ferret. (Mudie p. 159)
Emu (1)	19/41 tons orig. stern-wheeler		H. Williams 1879	Sheridan 1867, 1872; W. Smith 1871–1873; F. Gurney 1872–1874; Wilkes (Wilks ?) 1874; Freeherne 1876		Converted to side-wheeler 1872
Emu (2)		1888–	Sleigh & Coombes 1891–1896	E. Fowler 1893; Duffy 1893, 1894; T. Davis 1895	Diamentina [sic] 1891	H. C. Sleigh later shipping and "Golden Fleece" petroleum magnate
Emmylou		1908–	Murray River Paddlesteamers			Built as tourist vessel. Featured in TV series All the Rivers Run as "PS Providence".
Endeavour	iron hull	1866–1879	J. Egge 1868	J. Egge 1868–1874; J. S. Upton 1876; E. W. Randell (when?)		Hawking steamer
Endeavour				M. Gabb 1908		Missionary steamer
Enterprise (1)		1868–1874	J. Mackintosh 1868; J. Maultby 1871–	R. Davey 1869; C. Berthon 1875; Church 1876; E. Cremer 1877; W. Keir 1873	Moama 1870	Built specifically to cart redgum timber from Bamah forest. Became trading steamer for Joseph Maultby, purchased by S.A. Government c. 1874 and fitted with (coal-burning) boiler; sent to Top End for construction phase of the Australian Overland Telegraph Line. Returned to Murray 1878. Later renamed Rita
Enterprise (2)		1878–	R. Keir 1878–1889; C. Hunt 1889; T. H. Freeman 1894; Gem Navigation Co. 1909–	W. Keir 1878–1889; R. Keir 1887–1889; Johnson 1882; M.Cole 1882; A. De Forest 1887; F. Toomer 1891; D. Sinclair 1892; L. Strom 1894; J. Newman 1908, 1909; W. F. Bailey 1910	Energetic 1878–1879; Border Chief 1879; Reliance 1879; Belubla 1879–1882, 1887–1889; Gunbower 1882; Benduck 1882; Annie 1884–1889; Maori 1890	Snagging duties 1887. Barge sank in Lake Alexandrina 1887; Capt. Keir was criticized for lack of judgment. Barge Annie sunk 1889; Phillips recounts a 1973 race between Enterprise and Etona. Became houseboat at Mannum. In 1988 Enterprise was restored to run on Lake Burley Griffin as a working museum piece.
Era				J. Krause 1903	Columbia 1903	
Eric		1913–1918				later named W.F.B. then Bejo (Mudie p. 183) perhaps "B.J.O."
Esmeralda	140' × 32' side-wheeler	1919	Murray Shipping Co. 1919			largest boat on the Murray; built at Arnold's shipyards, Mannum, by Capt. P. J. Sandford.
Ethel Jackson "The Jackson"	266 tons 115' long, 62 hp.	1876–	McCulloch & Co. H. C. Sleigh c. 1892–1896	M. Mack 1876–1879; J. Lawson 1880, 1881; J. Dorey 1880, 1881	Namoi 1877, 1878–1880; Eagle 1878, 1880; Swallow 1878–1880; Border Chief 1881	Largest boat on the Murray, flagship of the McCulloch Company.
Etona (1)		1892–1900	Church of England		Rev. J. F. K. McKenzie 1892; Rev. W. J. Bussell 1894–1900	Missionary boat, named for Eton school. Purchased by SA Govt. 1900, renamed Alma
Etona (2)		1900–1912	Church of England		Rev. W. J. Bussell 1900–1912; Rev. H. F. Severn 1902–1909; Rev. F. W. Wilkinson 1910	The Etona was originally built in 1898 in Milang, SA by John McLellan, with assistance from his brother James McLellan, who stayed on to become the vessels engineer. Sold 1912, became fishing launch; replaced with motor boat Restored by P & R. Symonds of Echuca; Phillips recounts 1973 race between Enterprise and Etona. model, display at Cobdogla Steam Museum.
Eureka	80' × 25' flat-bottomed	1881–	J. H. Brown 1881–			A steamer Eureka was built by William Gordon c. 1850
Eva			Govt. marine underwriter surveyor	Earnshaw 1898		
Eva Millicent		1894–1903	E. Diener 1893–1903	E. Diener 1893–1903		Hawking steamer and residence; converted to barge behind Merle until replaced by Flo.
Excelsior	120' × 20' 142 tons 24 hp.	1873–	T. Brakenridge 1873; W. Anderson 1879; W. Hart 1889; E. Rich & Co. –1907; Permewan, Wright & Co. 1907– Gem Navigation Co. 1912; W. Bowring & Co. 1909–1930; Collins	T. Brakenridge 1873–1876; W. Mathews 1873–1875; Blake 1879; W. Thompson 1882, 1894–1897; W. Hart 1889; J. Newman 1910; G. McLean 1912; J. Hemfield 1912; H. Hart 1913, 1914; E. Orchard 1912–1914; R. Potter 1913, 1917; J. Nutchey 1916; G. Dorward jr. 1916; E. R. Randell 1923, 1925	Morning Star 1876; Paika 1881; Border Chief 1896–1897; Howlong 1896–1897, 1883; Florence Annie 1909, 1912; Annie 1909, 1925; Empress 1912; Maori 1913; Ukee 1913, 1914; Moorara 1913–1914, 1917; Hartley 1914; Emerald 1916; Mallara 1917	Hawking steamer, sunk near Netley station in 1886 when overloaded with grog for Wilcannia; riot by 150 striking shearers ensued. Her paddlewheels were incorporated into M.V. Coonawarra 1950.
Express	17 tons 70' long, 8 hp.	1868–1878	T. Dowland snr. 1869–1870; Parker & Hilton 1870– Fallow 1877; F. Payne 1878; E. Dutton 1879	T. Dowland snr. 1869, 1870; H. Parker 1870, 1871; R. Hilton 1871, 1872; T. Saunier 1871, 1872; W. Kerr 1873, 1874; Fredericks 1878		Destroyed by fire 1878.
Fairy			H. Brennan 1892; Johnson & Dodd 1898	E. Fowler 1881; W. Collins 1893, 1894; E. H. Dodd jr. 1898	Sprite 1883, 1884	Small trading steamer
Federal			Taylor 1903	J. Gibbs 1905–1908	Pearl 1902; Emerald 1903	Light draught steamer like Alpha and Mannum. Served as mail steamer between Morgan and Mannum 1903–1909. Became houseboat, perhaps at Morgan.
Ferret (Ferrett?)	57' × 14'	1883–	Wilson & Glew 1883	D. Sinclair 1884; W. Porter 1884; J. Fyfe 1884; W. Wilson 1884–1888; Pearson 1890; F. Salmon 1892, 1896	Result 1884, 1886; Annie 1890	Light draught steamer. Documentation or photograph needed to prove whether her name was "Ferrett" (surname) or "Ferret" (animal).
Firefly	5 tons	1864–1867		W. Pullar		First steamer to work from Echuca. Previously on Yarra and later purchased by South Australian government for Cadell's Northern Territory explorations.
Florence Annie	110' × 25' 100 tons	1882–1908	Brown 1882; Goode & Goode 1907	J. McMillan 1882–1884; D. Cremer (when?); Merton 1891; C. Westin 1892, 1896; T. C. Goode	Cutty Sark 1882; Emily 1885	Hawking steamer or floating store, based at Bourke then Goolwa. Stuck at Louth during drought 1885–1886; Converted to barge Florence Annie 1909.
Forester	stern-wheeler 55' × 12'	1891–1901	N.S.W. Govt. Forestry Department			After serving for a few high-level tours of inspection, she was moored at Tocumwal and sank at her moorings 1901, was raised at great expense and promptly sank again. She was advertised for sale that same year and may have been broken up.
Fort Bourke						see Lady Daly
Francis Cadell; See also steamer Cadell above.	iron side-paddles 60 hp., 110 ft × 16 ft. 140 tons. Built by J & W Dudgeon, Cubitt Town and shipped in sections	1866–1868	J. King 1866; Murray & Jackson	J. King 1866; Grundy 1892?		Sent to Brisbane; A. T. Saunders suggests she drew too much water for Murray navigation.
Fraser		1873–	Public Works department (Vic. govt.)			snagging steamer named for Alexander Fraser, Public Works commissioner decommissioned before Wardell and Melbourne
Freetrader	side-paddles 93 tons 98' long	1872–1888	McCulloch & Co.	F. Toomer 1872, 1874; C. Hill 1873; S. Williams 1874; W. Porter 1875, 1876; J. Lawson 1877; J. Dorey 1878–1881; J. Tait 1881; G. Jolly 1883; W. J. Carlyon 1888	Advance 1872; Swallow 1874, 1879; Alice 1878; Gwydir 1878–1879, 1882–1886; Paroo 1879; Pelican 1879; Gunbower 1880; Pimpampa 1881; Namoi	Lay idle in Darling with barges 1882–1886 due to low river levels, silted up irretrievably. Purchased by Charles Hunt and her copper sheathing and machinery salvaged. He was subsequently called on to clear the derelict.
Gem	96' × 20' 143 tons	1876–	Reid & King; Sabine 1878; E. Randell 1877–1879; Chaffey Gem Navigation Co. 1909– Murray Shipping Ltd. 1919; Sold 1952	H. W. King 1889–1908; J. Nutchey 1903–1915; Dubois 1915; H. McLean 1917, 1942, 1943; V. Byrne 1921, 1923; G. H. Alexander 1924; W. O. Searles 1925–1928; H. Payne 1939; G. Makin 1948	Pearl 1907	Built by Air & Westergaard; Lengthened by 40' c. 1882; First to employ electric light. Sank 1948; one frail passenger died. In 1949 described as three-decker passenger boat
Gemini	twin hull	1855–1863	W. R. Randell	W. R. Randell 1855–1859; C. Stilton 1860; E. Randell 1860, 1861	Goolwa 1860, 1861	One hull was originally Mary Ann. Reached Bourke, Brewarrina 1857.(Mudie p. 70); Reached Walgett in floods of 1861.(Mudie p. 78)
Gertrude "Gerty"	34 tons, 60 ft. × 10 ft.	1873–	Swannell & Wallace 1873; A. H. Landseer	J. Wallace 1873, 1874; Swannell 1875; Kopp 1875, 1876		Replaced Blanche as mail steamer on Lakes Alexandra and Albert. Converted from screw to paddles 1875.
Glad Tidings		1894, 1895	Rev. W. Corly Butler	Rev. W. C. Butler		see Dione above
Glimpse (1)	48' long	1884–1886	Wilson Brothers, B.R. & C.J.	Master Craik 1884; R. Keir 1884; D. Sinclair 1884; W. Porter 1885; C. P. Johnson 1885 (Mudie p. 121); C. Wilson 1885	Impulse 1885	Built on the banks of the Murray River at Koondrook by B. R. Wilson. Light draught steamer with Altlas 10 hp engine, first trialled 21 March 1884; Destroyed by fire at Koondrook 25 January 1886. Raised from 20' of water and slipped at Koondrook for rebuild 24 June 1886
Glimpse (2)	60' long	1887–	Wilson Brothers, B.R. & C.J. A. Arbuthnot & Sons 1913–	C. Wilson 1886–1888; A. De Forest 1897; W. Johnson 1899	Impulse 1887	Light draught steamer rebuilt from Glimpse (1). Trialled 3 February 1887
Golconda	78' × 16' 97 tons	1877–	R.F. Williamson, C. Hansen, J.L. Simpson 1877– J. H. Brown; F. E. Schuetze; J. G. Arnold	F. C. Hansen 1877–1880; D. Sinclair 1879? A. Dusting 1880, 1881; J. McMillan 1881, 1882; C. Cowley 1882; C. Bock 1887; J. G. Arnold	Leviathan 1877–1883, 1885, 1887, 1889, 1891; Woorooma(?) 1879	Converted from barge Golconda. Another barge Golconda was owned by W. T. Tutcher in May 1881, at which time steamer Golconda, involved in collision with Moira, was owned by J. H. Brown. Her barge Leviathan sunk 1881, again in 1891.
Goldsbrough	84' × 15'	1875–	L. McBean 1875; Cramsie, Bowden & Co. 1882; Permewan, Wright & Co. H. Palmer 1910	Church 1876; J. Christy 1877, 1878; J. Page 1888–1890; John James 1878; J. Innes 1878, 1887; J. Dorey 1878; D. Sinclair 1879; C. Cowley 1880; E. Crowle 1880; W. Bulled 1880; J. Fyfe 1880; W. Sugden 1881; H. Theisz 1881; W. Keir 1882; M. Cole 1882, 1883; P. Westergaard 1883–1886; A. Nutchey 1890–1899, 1901; G. Thomson 1897; W. Knight 1905; J. Gibbs 1910, 1911; Dubois 1915	Woorooma 1876, 1878, 1880–1881, :1886; Jessie 1883, 1888, 1908; Pimpampa 1883, 1885, 1889; Horace 1883–1886, 1888, 1905; Victory 1886; Tongo 1887–1894, 1898–1900; Paroo 1888, 1891; Namoi 1888; Confidence 1889, 1890, 1897; Eagle 1890, 1892; Sprite 1899; Nelson 1892, 1893, 1896, 1899, 1900, 1905, 1908; Gunbower 1896–1897, 1915; J.L. Roberts 1897, 1898; Lancashire Witch 1897, 1905; Maori 1905, 1915; Uranus 1910; Crowie 1914	
Goolwa (1)	Iron hull, twin screw 30 tons	1866–1872	Johnston & Murphy	J. Gillon 1867–1871; J. Morris 1870; C. Murphy 1870; W. Dickson 1871		Very shallow draught, intended to carry small loads in the dry season Sold to J. Becker for use on Gippsland Lakes.
Goolwa (2)	Iron hull 31 tons	1873–	A. Ross & Co. 1875; Johnston & Murphy 1879	B. Atkins 1874; M. Mack 1875; J. Nash 1875, 1876, 1879	Bogan 1873	
Grappler "The White Elephant"	snag steamer	1858–	S.A. Government	Williams; G. W. Brown 1867–1872; J. Lindsay 1872–1875		Built in Echuca at Cadell's suggestion, to clear "snags" (underwater obstructions) but was largely ineffective (Mudie p. 46). Other reports were far more favourable. Sent up-stream 1878 for use as police station. Converted to dredge 1880.
Gundagai	iron hull 96 tons, 40 hp.	1855–1866	River Murray Navigation Co.	E. Robertson 1855; G. B. Johnston 1856; J. Mace 1856; H. Mennie 1856; John Barclay 1857–1864; H. King 1862–1865; W. Barber 1862	Wakool 1855–1857; Eureka 1856; Murrumbidgee 1855–1857; Darling 1857–1858	She was sent to New Zealand 1865 and totally wrecked 1866 on the Pātea River.
Hero	92 ft × 17 ft 63/137 tons 45 hp	1874–1957; 2000–now	J. Maultby 1874– W. Keir 1882; D. Stratton & Co. 1890; Donaldson, Coburn & Knox 1901; Permewan, Wright & Co. J. C. Grassey & Partners; Collins Bros. c. 1942; Forestry Commission; Collins Bros. 1950–1954	J. Maultby 1874–1890; A. Dusting 1891, 1893–1897; E. Fowler 1892; G. Robson 1905; D. Nutchey 1906; W. Knight 1906; H. Hogg 1942–1944; S. Clarke 1943–1949	Queen 1878–1882; Echuca 1883, 1885, 1887, 1890, 1908; Eagle 1896, 1901; Jessie 1897, 1907, 1908, 1911; Nelson 1905; Ada 1906; J.L. Roberts 1908; Albemarle 1909; Namoi 1910; John Campbell 1943, 1950; Canally 1950	Restored c. 2000; based at Echuca, used for private charters.
Industry (1)	98' × 11', 15 hp.	1878–	J. & K. Nutchey; A. H. Landseer	J. Nutchey 1880; E. Fitzgerald 1887; M. Barber 1885–1905; G. Grundy jr. 1909 1905, 1909	Mary Ann 1887	Oniginally barge, built 1876; converted to steamer 1878.
Industry (2)	112' × 19.3'	1911–		G. Grundy jr. 1912, :1916, 1919, 1920, 1922; H. Brand 1923–1928, 1930; D. Burns 1941		Snagging operations for SA Government. Delivering pile timber in 1926.
Invincible (1)	92' × 16' 3", 140 tons	1878–1889	F. Payne 1877–1879; Echuca Steamship Co. 1879–1882; C. Hunt; Wm. McCulloch; W. Carlyon 1886; C. Hunt 1887, 1890; W. Miers & Co. 1899	J. Innes 1878; J. Morris 1878, 1879; W. Hampson 1879–1881; R. Lewen 1880; A. Manning 1881; C. Johnson 1881; C. Hill 1882; W. Porter 1884; J. Newman 1886; W. Carlyon 1886; C. Hunt 1887–1889; D. Bower 1888; G. Jolly 1887; J. Burgess 1888	Goolwa 1878; Energetic 1878; Confidence 1878; Gunbower 1878–1879; Reliance 1878–1879, 1881; Eagle 1886; Federation 1887; Pelican 1887, 1890; Nelson 1890	McCulloch & Co. sold their Echuca fleet 1887
Invincible (2)	91 ft × 20 ft	1889–	C. Hunt 1889–1917; Murray Shipping Ltd. Koondrook sawmills 1937	C. Hunt 1889–1892; W. Miers 1897–1900; H. Kelly 1922, 1925, 1932, 1934	J.L. Roberts 1934; Vega 1931, 1936, 1949	In 1889 while towing the barge Balubra near Balranald, the barge took on water and sunk. Fred Agars (a Cudmore descendant) drowned August 1896 after falling from the Invincible; 1936 carried last bales of wool handled at Echuca wharf.
J. G. Arnold	Sidewheeler	1916–	J. G. Arnold	W. Bailey 1917, 1918, 1921; L. Mewett 1923; C. Cantwell 1925; L. McLean 1927–1929	Crowie 1917, 1918, 1922; Ukee 1919–1921, 1932; Loxton 1923; Kulnine 1923, 1928	Built from wreck of Arbuthnot. Image at State Library of New South Wales; In 1917 her barge Crowie carried record 2000 bales of wool; in 1925 the same barge towed by Decoy carried 2,493 bales. Towing barges with stone for construction of Lock 8 in 1932.
J. H. P. "The Coffin" "Darning Needle"	steel stern-wheeler, 30 ton	1866–1872	Pollard & Saunders 1868; J. Warby 1869–1870; Wallace & Dawson 1871–1872; H. King 1872–1873	T. Connell 1866–1870; Adamson 1870; J. M. Wallace 1871; Parker 1872; Barrenger 1872; H. King 1872		Named for J. H. Pollard. Steamer Alfred was sister ship, but side-wheeler. Capsized near Echuca 1869; one man drowned. Dubbed "The Coffin", and the "Darning Needle" on account of her narrow beam, she had more than her share of capsizings. Converted to barge for Princess Royal 1873.
Jandra		1894–1921	A. Senior & W. & H. Brown 1894–	W. Brown 1912; G. Pickhills		Converted to barge 1921. Subject (as "Yanda") of C. E. W. Bean's book Dreadnought of the Darling
Jane Eliza "Jane"	98/120 tons	1867–	Smith & Banks 1867– Davies & Dorward; H. King with W.L & H. T. Reid 1875– H. King 1879; Chaffey brothers	G. Smith 1867–1870; J. Banks 1869, 1870, 1872; W. Thompson c. 1871; A. Peirce 1871; F. Foord 1872; G. Dorward 1874; H. King 1875, 1878; T. Saunier 1879; W. Porter 1883; A. Dusting 1883–1886	Only Son 1869; Wangaratta 1869–1872,1883; Reliance 1876; Goolwa 1878; Isabel 1879–1880,1883	Built from wreck of Beechworth (Mudie p. 223); Stuck in Darling 1883–1886 with building materials for hotel (Mudie p. 229–233); Sunk after collision with Paringa 1883; may have had more collisions than any other steamer on the Murray.(Mudie p. 228)
Jolly Miller	iron hull length 90' 92 tons	1866–	T. Johnston 1866; J. Wallace 1867; F. Johnstone 1873; W. Collins 1908– Gem Navigation Co. 1914	J. Wallace 1866–1868; J. Ritchie 1868; W. Barber 1868, 1869; T. Johnston 1870, 1872, :1874, 1875; Waters 1871; J. Johnston 1875; J. Shetliff 1893–1895; W. Collins 1908–1910	Emily; Maid of the Murray 1874, 1875; Murrumbidgee 1872, 1874, 1875	First iron-hulled vessel to be built in South Australia.
Julia "Mayho"	39 tons		J. Mackintosh 1871–1879; Mackintosh Sawmill Co. 1888; W. Wilson 1894–1899; F. O. Wallin 1899–1906	Lewen 1870; C. Hill 1871; J. Gribble 1874; G. Jolly 1878; J. Patterson 1882, 1884; F. O. Wallin 1898–1906	In Renmark nicknamed "Mayho" or "Mayo" (Mudie p. 129)	
Jupiter	iron hull, 119 tons	1868–1933	King & Reid; J. King −1875; W & H Dunk 1921, 1928; A. H. Landseer 1929–	J. King 1869–1874; J. Tait 1871, 1875, 1876; T. Saunier 1874, 1875; G. Pickhills 1875; A. Tait 1876; E. Cremer 1876; Ritchie 1892–1893; D. Cremer 1902, 1907, 1908 :1921, 1922, 1928	Venus 1875, 1893; Isabel 1876	Jupiter built as a barge from imported sections in 1866; rebuilt and fitted with engine from Lady Augusta in 1868. Barge Venus sunk 1893.
Kelpie	45 tons length 82'	1864–	J. Symington; W. & A. Sugden; Cramsie, Bowden, & Co. (April 1877); Permewan Wright & Co.	J. Symington 1864–1873; H. Dewing 1869; R. Davey 1872; R. G. Lewen 1874, 18875; W. Sugden 1875, 1876; W. Rowlands 1876; G. Dorward jr. 1877, 1878; J. Innes 1879–1893; D. Sinclair 1887; Johnson 1888; G. Lindqvist 1895	Redgum 1869; Waterwitch 1869, 1871; Lancashire Witch 1876; Horace 1878–1883, 1893; Jessie 1878–1884, 1889, 1891–1894; Belubla 1882; Woorooma 1885, 1886; Pimpampa 1885–1888; Nelson 1886, 1890–1892, 1894; Paroo 1889, 1891–1893; Tongo 1889; Maori 1889	Originally a stern-wheel boat but rebuilt with side-paddles. Engineer John Ayre lost overboard 1872.
Kelvin		1912–	D. J. Ritchie 1912– S.A. Irrigation Department 1919; R. Reed 1937	D. J. Ritchie 1912– J. Grundy 1920; C. Payne 1932; R. Reed 1934, 1935		Built from wreck of steamer Ariel; replaced Dispatch as passenger and mail steamer between Morgan and Murray Bridge 1912.
Kennedy	109' 114 tons	1864–	J. Cornish; A. Sunman; Acraman, Main, & Co. 1875; E. Main 1879	J. Cornish 1864–1867; W. Parker 1866, 1867, :1871, 1872; J. Lindsay 1869; A. Sunman 1870–1876, :1878, 1880; C. Bock 1883	Darling 1864–1865, 1872–1873; Hume 1870, 1873, 1875–1876	
Kingfisher		−1893	S. Williams 1877; C. Roberts 1881	Church 1874; F. C. Hansen 1875–1878; E. Crowle 1878; W. Bulled 1879, 1880; D. Sinclair 1880; W. Stone 1881, 1882; P. Westergaard 1882; A. McPherson 1884; C. Johnson 1884–1886; J. Patterson 1890; G. Lindqvist 1892; E. Golding 1892	Leviathan 1878; Canally 1878; Reliance 1878, 1879; Benduck 1878–1879; Willandra 1879; Darling 1880; Goulburn 1881–1882; Pimpampa 1888; Horace 1888–1890; Maori 1891	
Kookaburra		1917	E. Diener	E. Diener 1917–1923; J. Nutchey 1924–1926; H. Hogg 1952	E. Diener 1918–1923	Hawking steamer and residence; converted from Diener's barge Flo. Phillips recounts race between Kookaburra and Coonawarra. Became houseboat at Mildura. Restored by Hilary Hogg 1953,
Lady Augusta	wood hull, 105' × 12'; 2 × 22 hp. 90 tons	1853–	River Murray Navigation Co. G. Young 1859; W. Barber 1879	W. Davidson 1853; F. Cadell 1853; W. Webb 1854; E. Robertson 1854, 1855, :1857–1859; T. Johnstone 1856; H. King 1861; W. Barber 1862–1866; F. Foord 1870	Murrumbidgee 1853, 1858, 1859, :1864, 1865; Eureka 1853, 1854, 1857, 1858; Wakool 1855	Named for the wife of Sir Henry Young, but inadvertently registered as "Lady Agusta". She was entirely built in Sydney, winner of S.A. Govt.'s £2,000 prize (and £2,000 bonus) as first commercial steamer on Murray. Samuel Darby (engineer) and Francis Clems (stoker) were scalded to death when a flue ruptured October 1856. Subject of interstate customs squabble.
Lady Daly	stern-wheeler 300 tons, 114 ft × 25 ft 6 in.	1862–1867, 1876–1878	Murray & Jackson; Gunn & Co. 1869; McCulloch & Co.	W. Luxon 1862, 1864, 1865; J. Mace 1864, 1865; Blake 1864, 1868; P. Jackson 1865; J. Lindsay 1866, 1867; A. Peirce; G. Pickhills 1869–1875; J. Burgess 1875; F. Toomer 1871–1876; W. Barber 1876; W. Pullar 1878	Mitta Mitta 1864; Paika 1870; Advance 1872; Waterwitch 1874; Federation 1874, 1876; Vanguard 1874; Empress 1876; Waterwitch 1876	Provisionally named Fort Bourke, she was at the time one of the largest on the river, second only to Ethel Jackson. Converted to log barge 1878.
Lady Darling	stern-wheeler	1864–1867	Murray & Jackson 1865; Smith & Banks 1865; G. Smith 1867	Blake 1864; H. King 1864; J. Mace 1865; Reis 1866; Scott 1867		Destroyed by fire 1867. She was rebuilt as the Corowa. (Mudie p. 173); Name changed "for good luck"
Lady of the Lake	60' × 20' 6"	1880–	F. Payne 1880–	R. G. Lewen 1880, 1881; F. Boxall 1882, 1885; F. Payne 1884, 1887, 1896–1898; J. Egge 1896; H. Payne 1896	Robbie Burns 1880, 1882, 1884, :1890, 1896–1897, 1899	Leichardt's barge of the same name abandoned off Middleton 1866. Noted for her shallow draught, she sank 1890 after striking submerged barge.
Lancashire Lass	92' × 17'	1878–	E. Whiteley 1878; J. S. Wilson 1888; B. R. Wilson 1894; Edward Rich 1896; E. Rich & Co. –1907; Permewan, Wright 1907– Knox & Downs 1917–	C. Cowley 1878; J. Christy 1879–1881; E. Barnes 1881; R. Hanson 1881; J. Dickson 1882–1888; D. Sinclair 1887, 1896–1898; C. J. Wilson 1888–1894; B. R. Wilson 1894–1895; A. De Forest 1895; Hart 1905; W. Thompson 1906; D. Nutchey 1908; E. Orchard 1911	Namoi 1878, 1892; Victory 1879–1883, 1885, 1887–1897, :1906, 1909, 1912; Belubla 1882; Confidence 1886–1887; Jessie 1886; Nelson 1886, 1887, 1911, 1915, 1917; Gwydir 1887; Paragon 1896; J.L. Roberts 1908; Horace 1910–1911, 1917; Gunbower 1911; Loxton 1914; Koondrook 1920	
Leichardt	iron hull, side paddles, 120' × 23' 60 hp. 97 tons	1856–1858	Chubb, Hill & Co, Acraman, Main, Lindsay, and Co.	A. McCoy 1856–1858; Davidson 1856, 1857	Lady of the Lake 1856–1857	Sister to steamer Sturt. Sailed to Batavia 1859, for use as river transport for troops at Bangor Massam, Borneo during the Banjarmasin War. Leichardt was the name of the steamer, although Ludwig Leichhardt was the name of the explorer for whom, no doubt, she was named.
Lioness	Iron hulled paddle steamer	1853	H. F. Cadell	R. Kay 1853		Sailed from Liverpool jury-rigged as schooner, with Robert Ross mate; George Gibson engineer; Avery was cook and crewed by George Johnston, James Ritchie, John Barclay and William Barber. She was sold to G. W. Cole of Melbourne for £21,000 (cost £5,500 in Scotland). There are reports that she was destined for Murray but somehow proved unsuitable without actually getting there.
Little Wonder	32 tons	1875–	McCulloch & Co.	J. Patterson 1876; J. Krause 1879, 1880; C. Schmedje sr. 1881, 1882; S. Cowley 1898	Swan 1876; Alice 1879–1880; Pimpampa 1880; Pocohontas 1882; Confidence	
Maggie	75 ft × 20 ft 4in.	1881–	R. S. Foley 1881– Paul Fischer 1909–	H. Theisz 1881–1883; Lewis 1883, 1884; J. Burgess 1885; F. C. Hansen 1885–1897; G. Lindqvist 1891, 1898, 1899; W. F. Bailey 1899; R. Strang 1904, 1905; Lewen 1905; W. Knight 1905; H. Teschner 1905	Energetic 1881–1882; Alice 1881, 1908; Advance 1882–1883, 1886; Native Companion 1884–1886; Tongo 1886–1889, 1895; Jessie 1888–1890, 1892, 1896, :1903, 1905–1906; Confidence 1889–1892, 1894–1896; Paroo 1890; Moira 1890; Maori 1890, 1892, 1895, 1903; Namoi 1893, 1895; Eagle 1894, 1896; Horace 1892, 1895; J.L. Roberts 1895, 1897, 1905; Echuca 1896, 1897, 1939; Lancashire Witch 1898; Nelson 1898, 1906, 1907; Ormond 1899, 1904; Goldsbrough 1901; Sarah Jane 1901; Paragon 1901; Ada 1902; Gunbower 1907; Sprite 1908	Refurbished as tourist vessel by Fischer. Used for tourist accommodation at Waikerie in 1910.
Mannum (1)	600 tons		Gem Navigation Co. 1909–	W. Tinks 1902; Smith 1913, 1914; S. Rossiter 1914; E. Orchard 1914, 1924; C. Payne 1920; T. C. Goode 1926	Emerald 1901, 1906; Susan 1903; Queen 1910; Pearl 1912; Florence Annie 1913; Moorara 1915	The largest boat on the Murray, she was largely destroyed by fire and scuttled at Mannum in 1920; raised by J. G. Arnold and P. Sandford in 1921. and rebuilt by Arnold.
Mannum (2)			River Navigation Co. 1920	J. Payne 1920		Possibly largest boat on the Murray
Maori				L. Searles 1907, 1908		Carrying firewood. Was she converted from barge Maori?
Maranoa	stern-wheeler length 117' 89 tons	1864–	Johnston & Murphy 1864– G. Johnston & Co. 1875	Peter Johnstone (Johnston?) 1866; T. Johnston 1868–1872; G. B. Johnston 1869–1872, :1874; James Barclay 1870–1875, 1879; J. Gillon 1870, 1872; W. Dickson 1871; C. Murphy 1871; W. Luxon 1871; E. Cremer 1873	Mitta Mitta 1865; Goolwa 1866; J & M 1867, 1872, 1874; Unknown 1874, 1875; Menindie 1878; Monarch 1879, 1884	Originally barge Maranoa.
Marion	110' × 23'	1900–	W. Bowring & Co. 1900– Ben Chaffey Steamboat Co. 1908–1909 Gem Navigation Co. 1909– Murray Shipping Co. 1920	A. Hart 1900–1908; G. McLean 1909, 1912; B. Atkins 1910; W. Tinks 1910; J. Nutchey 1911; G. Alexander 1911, 1914; C. Payne 1911, 1921–1931; H. Payne 1912; Smith 1913–1917; S. Rossiter 1914; R. Ransom 1916; H. McLean 1917; Morrison 1920, 1921; G. Makin 1924, 1944; W. H. Drage 1928, 1931–1942; L. McLean 1941, 1942, 1949	Paika 1906, 1914; Queen 1908, 1910; Emerald 1909; Ukee 1909; Pearl 1909; Cobar 1914; Mary Ann 1914	Originally barge Marion, purchased by George Fowler for conversion to pleasure vessel but after Fowler's death was bought by W. Bowring & Co., of Mildura and Wentworth, to replace their trading vessel Emily Jane. Converted to passenger boat 1914 with superstructure from Pearl. Extensively damaged by fire 1926; Operated as tourist vessel between Morgan and Mildura in the 1930s. In 1949 described as three-decker passenger boat
Mary Ann		1853–1855	W. R. Randell 1853–1855	W. R. Randell 1853–1855		Named for mother of Wm., Tom, Elliott and Eb. Randell; Became one of Gemini's twin hulls. The first paddle steamer to successfully traverse the Murray-Darling river system.
Mascotte		1911	Permewan, Wright & Co.	A. Nutchey 1911		Built as a barge in 1910; converted to steamer 1911.
Maude	300 tons	1885–	J. Lamby 1885; Sawers & Wilson; E. Rich & Co. –1907; Permewan, Wright 1907–	H. Theisz 1885–1887; W. Payne 1896–1898; H. Payne 1896–1898		Probably named for the Murrumbidgee town Engineer Wilcox lost both arms 1885. Capt. Theisz fell overboard and drowned 1887; Snagging duties 1898
Mayflower	50' × 12' 9" 14 tons	1884–	D. Alexander 1884–1890; Butterworth & Co. 1890	D. Alexander 1884–1890		Light draught steamer built after style of Ferret. (Mudie p. 159); Repossessed by bank 1890; PS Mayflower, stationed at Morgan is the oldest operating paddle steamer in South Australia.
Mayho						see Julia
Melbourne (1)	iron hull, 60 hp. 84 tons	1855–1859	River Murray Navigation Co.	F. Cadell; G. B. Johnston 1856; E. Robertson 1856; J. King; W. Barber 1859	Eureka 1856, 1859; Kennedy 1859	Broke up crossing the Murray mouth November 1859. No casualties.
Melbourne (2)		1872?–	Public Works department (Vic. govt.); Evans Bros. 1950	R. Shelley 1870, 1872; C. Hill 1872, 1873, 1875, 1878, :1882, 1884, 1887, 1888, 1890; G. Jansen 1902		Snagging steamer operations on upper Goulburn 1878. Laid up during 1902–1905 drought. (Mudie p. 234)
Menindie	106' × 16'; 93 tons	1875–	Heseltine & Reid 1875– R. M. Randell c. 1910–	Adam Johnstone (Mudie p. 116); C. Bock 1875; S. Heseltine 1875, 1876, 1879; R. Grundy 1893	Bourke 1876, 1877, 1879, 1881; Croupier 1895; Queen 1897	Almost certainly named for the town now spelled "Menindee". R. M. Randell changed name to Murrundi 1912; it became his houseboat. Frequently misnamed as "Murrurundi"; There was an iron barge Mennindie built 1866 for Johnston & Murphy or A.A.Scott & A. Kirkpatrick.
Merir	58 ft × 12 ft 6 in.	1890–				built for NSW Forest Dept.
Merle (1)	stern wheeler 82' 9" × 15'	1903–	E. Diener 1903–1917	E. Diener 1903–1917	Flo 1911–1916	Hawking steamer, named for Diener's eldest daughter (barge Flo was named for the younger daughter). Sunk in Lake Alexandrina 1917.
Merle (2)	twin screw, 110 ton	1943–	G. H. Griffin 1941–1945; E. Griffin 1945–1952; C. Payne 1946, 1947; W. Bowhey 1952–	G. H. Griffin 1941–1943; E. Griffin; C. Payne 1945; V. Byrne 1953		Two-decker motor vessel offering regular cruises between Murray Bridge and Morgan.
Milang		1878–	A. H. Landseer 1878; H. Dunk 1891; W. & H. Dunk 1904; T. Goode 1909– Hume Bros 1920; Eudunda Farmers Coop. Society 1931–	G. Rogers 1893, 1894, 1900, 1902; T. C. Goode 1909; McDonald 1913, 1917; S. Rossiter 1928; J. Grundy (when?)	Empress 1881, 1910; Unknown 1909, 1910; Rosa 1909, 1910; Pearl 1913; Horace 1917; Alfred 1920; Jessie 1924	Described as mail steamer 1891
Moira (1)		1865–1869	H. King 1865–	H. King 1865–1869; Smith 1867; Lewen 1868		Described as a "little steamer", it is likely that the barge Moira (which became the second steamer Moira) was not the same hull.
Moira (2)	83 ft. × 17 ft. 90 tons	1875–1904	H. Luth 1875; J. Christy 1878; Seward 1881; W. Dickson; John O'Connell 1893–1904	C. Hill 1876, 1881–1883; J. Christy 1878; F. C. Hansen 1881–1883; W. Dickson 1889, 1892–1898	Gunbower 1881; Golconda 1881; Emily 1896–1897	Moira was a barge until c. 1875, and converted for Luth & Riddell's sawmills. Her barge Golconda sank 1881, later used for irrigation pumping. Destroyed by fire 1904.
Monada			D. Treacy 1926, 1939; L. Mewett 1944	D. Treacy 1937; L. Mewett 1944	Emerald	Originally steamer Princess Royal (see below), she was based in Mildura.
Moolara	110' × 20' 6"	1909–	B. Chaffey			Steamer, twin of barge Mallara.
Moolgewanke	iron hull 103' × 10' 60 tons	1856–	Webb & Napier 1856; Johnston & Murphy 1860– (Mudie p. 74); E. H. Randell −1871; W. Luxmoore; S. Wilson; Tonkin & Fuller 1879; Tonkin, Fuller & Martin	W. Webb 1856–1859; G. B. Johnston 1860; E. H. Randell 1863–1865, 1867, :1868, 1870, 1871, 1874; S. Wilson 1871; B. M. Fuller 1874–1877; F. Blake 1875	Unknown 1858–1862; Morning Star 1863; Kulnine 1865, 1870	Perhaps a native name for "devil". First to reach Deniliquin 1860 (Mudie p. 75); Left for Melbourne November 1862, intended for New Zealand but returned to Murray 1863; James Long (boundary rider), Sam Son (cook) killed 1874 when boiler exploded near Swan Reach; Left Murray for Gulf trade 1871
Mosquito	50' 20 tons	1857–1858	A. Landseer	W. Masson 1857		Transported overland, launched at Milang Reached Balranald 1857. Converted to schooner 1860.(Mudie p. 64)
Mundoo	22 tons	1875–	E. H. Dodd 1879; Spry Bros. E. Rich & Co. –1907; Permewan, Wright 1907– J. G. Arnold 1911	D. McBeath 1875, 1876; Walter 1877; E. H. Dodd 1878, 1890,1893,1896; G. Pickhills 1895, 1896; G. Merrett 1896; C. Westin 1897, 1898; S. Watson 1912; Dubois 1914	Isabel 1879; Duck 1879, 1884, 1886–1887, 1910 :1895–1899; Hartley 1909; Rabbie Burns 1910; Gunbower 1914; Livingstone 1914; Maori 1916	Caught fire and sank 1876 while carrying railway iron; back in operation, perhaps enlarged, by 1878; Barge Hartley sunk 1909. Barge Livingstone sunk 1914.
Murrabit	112 ft × 23 ft, 90 hp.	1914–	Arbuthnot & Sons; Budarick Bros 1917– A. H. Landseer 1922; L. M. Arnold 1948	P. Johnson 1914; W. Budarick 1919; A. Price 1921; F. Weaver c. 1930; T. C. Goode 1939; P. Treleaven 1948	Koondrook 1917, 1921; Nelson 1919; Crowie 1939	Replacement for Arbuthnot, which was destroyed by fire. Crewman Olaf Olsen was murdered with axe 1921 in her barge Koondrook. Albert Smith given life sentence. 1927–1933 towing barges with stone from Mannum for lock construction.
Murray (1)	screw steamer	1861–1862		D. Napier 1861; W. Barber 1862		sold to Australian Steam Navigation Co. of Sydney.
Murray (2)	paddle steamer 135' × 22', 313 ton	1866 only	Johnston & Murphy	Ritchie		Built in Scotland and sailed to SA as schooner by Richard Berry. travelled no higher than Goolwa; almost immediately sold to Captain Dove of Melbourne for trading on the Gippsland Lakes.
Murray Explorer			Murray River Developments; Murray River Cruises			Diesel-powered tourist vessel.
Murray Princess	70m. length; 120 passengers	July 1986	Murray River Developments (1986-1988); Captain Cook Cruises (1988-2011); Sealink Travel Group (2011-2021); Kelsian Group (2021-)	Hutton		Diesel-powered tourist vessel operated out of Mannum, South Australia. Owned and Operated by Kelsian Group.
Murray River Queen		1979–	Murray River Developments (1979-1988); Captain Cook Cruises <1988-1993); Murray River Queen Pty Ltd.(2022-)			Decommissioned in 1993. Moored in Goolwa as a floating hotel until 2003. Moved to Waikerie. Permanently moored in Renmark since 2017.
Murrumbidgee :"'Bidgee"	82' × 16' 6", 108 tons 14 hp.	1865–1949	Duncan & Bower 1867; McCulloch & Co. J. Egge 1887; Gem Navigation Co. 1909– A. H. Landseer 1913; S. Clarke 1923–1946; Murray Valley Coaches Ltd.	J. Duncan 1867; D. Bower 1869–1873; R. Davey 1874; J. Patterson 1874, 1875; J. Gribble 1875, 1876; J. Christy 1876; J. Burgess 1877–1880; W. Pullar 1878; J. Page 1880; J. Krause 1880; J. Dorey 1880–1885; J. Lawson 1880–1883; F. Toomer 1883, 1884; C. Cantwell 1884; J. Egge 1896; E. Egge 1898; S. Armfield 1898, 1907, 1908; G. Grundy 1902–1904; H. W. King 1909; S. Rossiter 1914; S. Clarke 1923–1946; T. Bynon (when?)	Minnie Watt 1874; Namoi 1876; Alice 1876, 1878; Paroo 1877; Federation 1878; Advance 1879; Swallow 1879; Pimpampa 1879–1882; Gwydir 1881; Swallow 1881; Willandra 1882, 1883; Pelican 1884; Swan 1888; Susan 1888, 1896, 1897, 1901; Hilda 1901; Croupier 1903; Empress 1903; Cobar 1904; Queen 1907; Ormond 1909; Nelson 1923; J.L. Roberts 1943–1946	Engineer Robert Ware lost overboard 1871 when steam valve failed. In 1942 the vessel and barge J.L. Roberts were commandeered by the army for use by the Hay internment camp. Fireman Job Eastwood died from infection following laceration. Paddlewheel shaft used for M.V. Coonawarra 1950
Murrumbidgee II						see Coonawarra
Murrundi		1912–1950				Originally Menindie (see above).
Napier	93 tons screw steamer	1874–	A. Graham 1874; G. Johnston & Co. 1875	G. B. Johnston 1875	Left for Melbourne 1876	
Nellie	85' × 20'	1882–1930	W. Hampson 1882; Chaffey Bros. King & Co. M. C. Crane & Co. 1903–	W. Hampson 1882, 1883; Hart 1898, 1899; M. Crane 1906, 1907, 1909, :1911–1915, 1919–1921	Horace 1882; Isabel 1893; Hartley 1906; Saddler 1909; Union 1919	Originally hawking steamer, converted to mail and passenger boat 1912. Replaced Kelvin as passenger and mail steamer between Morgan and Murray Bridge or Morgan and Mannum. Destroyed by fire 1930.
Nil Desperandum "Black Swan"	length 110' 106 tons	1865–	W. R. Randell 1865–	W. R. Randell 1870–1874; R. Anderson 1873, 1877; John Anderson 1880	Bogan 1872–1874; Eclipse 1879–1880, 1884	Originally a barge built from half of Gemini then converted to steamer c. 1870
Nile	70'. × 16' 50 tons	1885–	W. J. & W. E. Davies; Permewan Wright & Co. Brown Bros. 1911–1926	W. J. Davies 1885; W. E. Davies 1887; F. Tucker 1888–1891, 1893; P. Westergaard 1891; D. Bower 1886, 1892, 1893, :1895, 1897–1899; C. Cantwell 1887, 1896; J. Innes 1898; G. Robson 1905	Lancashire Witch 1887, 1888, 1897, :1890, 1891, 1897, 1907; Sarah Jane 1890, 1894, 1897; Annie 1890; Zulu 1890; Maori 1891, 1897, 1902; Pimpampa 1897; Sprite 1896, 1898, 1901; Ormond 1907	Light draught steamer built after style of Ferret. (Mudie p. 159); Caught fire 1895
North Star				H. Hogg 1950		
L'Orient				R. Isherwood 1889		see City of Oxford
Oscar / Oscar W.	iron hull 105' × 21'	1908–	F. O. Wallin 1908–1909; Permewan, Wright & Co. 1909– Highways and Local Government Department 1953	D. Nutchey 1911, 1914, 1918, 1930; C. F. Haynes 1925; L. McLean 1930–1934; R. J. Johnson 1935	F. O. Wallin 1908; Jessie 1909, 1912–1913; Maori 1909; Ormond 1909; J.L. Roberts 1909, 1911–1915; Ulonga 1910; Ada 1910, 1918, 1925, 1927; Namoi 1912; Mallara 1920; Moorara 1921, 1923, 1924; Echuca 1923; Kulnine 1934; Australia's Wealth 1934	Built at Echuca; originally Oscar; renamed Oscar W. in 1909 for Wallin's son, who was later killed in World War I. Old name continued to be used as often as not. Exchanged by Wallin for Clyde in 1909. Ship's cook J. "Tassy" Russell drowned 1925. Later operated as a tourist attraction at Goolwa.
Osprey		1882–	J. Robson			Used for towing redgum logs
Paringa	106' × 20' 148 tons	1878–	Tonkin, Fuller & Martin; Fuller	Andrew Martin; B. M. Fuller 1883		Hawking steamer, burnt at Renmark Sunk after collision with Jane Eliza 1883
Pearl (1)	stern-wheeler 77 tons 75 ft. × 15 ft.	1866–	E. C. Randell; Davies & Dorward 1878	E. C. Randell 1866–1872, 1875, 1876; Adams 1872; W. Porter 1874; Church 1875, 1876; G. Dorward jr. 1879, 1880; J. Dickson 1880–1882; R. Strang 1882, 1883; F. Maultby 1883; C. Bock c. 1885	Paika 1869–1871, 1873, 1876; Jessie 1878–1881; Native Companion 1879; Horace 1879–1881, 1883; Belubla 1882–1883; Victory 1882; Woorooma 1883	
Pearl (2)	steel stern-wheeler	1891	Chaffey Bros 1891; W & F Brown 1914–	J. Tait 1890, 1891; J. A. Barber 1891; W. Miers 1891–1897		Built on Mississippi pattern; imported in sections by Chaffey brothers, but performed poorly. Modifications by Richard Craig ( – 20 April 1930) were largely successful.
Pevensey	111' × 23' 130 tons	1911–	Permewan, Wright & Co; Murray River Steamship Co.	A. Nutchey 1915, 1916, 1918; C. Cantwell 1930–1932; H. McLean 1937, 1941–1944; G. Makin 1942	Maori 1912; Echuca 1912, 1917–1919, 1921, :1923–1926; Ormond 1914; J.L. Roberts 1916–1918, 1921, 1932; Mallara 1921; Kulnine 1932; H. Payne 1937; Loxton 1942	Record 2,600 bales carried by Pevensey and Kulnine 1928, 1930–1932, 1937. Largely destroyed by fire October 1932. Deckhand Jones lost his foot in a barge accident 1937. Featured in TV series All the Rivers Run as "PS Philadelphia". Now a tourist vessel based in Echuca.
Pilot		1883–	W. Wolter 1883– E. Rich & Co. –1907; Permewan, Wright 1907–1910; Barmah Sawmilling Co. 1910– G. King 1915–1917	W. Wolter 1886–1901, 1896; G. King 1915–1917	Cobar 1883; Alice 1888, 1893, 1896–1897, 1899–1901, 1903, 1905; Florence Annie 1897; Emily 1907; Ormond 1909; Maori 1909–1911	
Pioneer	63 tons, 175 tons (see ref)	1870–	Robert Barbour 1870–1873; Whitely & Cole 1873– Brown & Ritchie 1875–1880; J. Ritchie sr. 1880–1881; Ritchie bros. G. Ritchie 1891–1899; McCulloch & Co. E. Rich & Co. George Ferguson 1907	J. Duncan 1870; C. Hill 1870; H. Theisz 1874, 1880; J. Christy 1875, 1876; J. Ritchie 1878–1880, 1882; A. Dusting 1881; Burnaby 1881, 1882; Ebery 1881; H. Hart 1896; C. Payne 1897, 1898, 1903, 1904; T. C. Goode 1906	Energetic 1878; Trader 1878–1879, 1881–1882, 1890, :1896–1897; Livingstone 1897; Swan 1898; Emily 1899, 1901, 1903; Undaunted 1906	There appears to have been two Pioneers in 1879; Renamed William R. Randell (see below) around 1907.
Platypus	screw steamer 6 tons	1866	Johnston & Murphy 1866; Robert Barbour 1879; W. Barber			Sister ship to Bunyip, regular service Wagga Wagga to Narrandera 1879–1880. Later used by Hercules Sawmills of Narrandera, which sold up in 1884.
Portee	30' side-wheeler			R. Anderson 1881		Originally a ship's lifeboat (Mudie p. 207)
Pride of the Murray (1)	Stern-wheel 83' × 16' 60 tons	1865–1921	Johnson, Davies and Co. 1865–1869; Davies & Locke 1869; W. Davies 1879; W. Davies & Son 1885	W. J. Davies 1865–1877; J. Gribble 1875; W. Rowlands 1877–1889; W. E. Davies 1878–1884; F. Tucker 1891–1901; C. Hill (when?); J. Webb (when?)	Moira 1869; Only Son 1869–1871; Swallow 1873; Sarah Jane 1876, 1882; Bourke 1876; Lancashire Witch 1877–1880, :1882, 1886, 1889; Willandra 1881, 1882; Portsea 1886; Jessie 1893, 1897; Nelson 1897, 1898; Cobar 1889; J.L. Roberts 1899; Horace 1897	Sunk at Echuca 1921 after having been virtually abandoned for several years.
Pride of the Murray (2)	stern-wheeler 98/142 tons	1924– 1977–				Built at Echuca as barge C24. It was rebuilt in 1977 as a tourist vessel; in 2022 transported to Longreach, Queensland, for use as a tourist attraction on the Thompson River.
Prince Alfred	86' × 12' 6" 43 tons	1867–1900	Oliver & Walker; C. Oliver −1875; John Haigh 1875– J. Egge 1879; W. Bowring & Co. 1900	E. Walker 1867–1872; C. Morton 1870; C. Oliver 1870–1875; Wallace 1871; J. Egge 1875; J. Heigh 1875; S. Heseltine 1875	Susan 1891; Isabel 1899	Replacement for Warrego; Destroyed by fire 1900.
Princess	210 tons	1874–	R. Barbour 1874–	C. Hill 1874, 1875; M. Cole 1877; F. Toomer 1878; J. Lawson 1879, 1880; J. Dorey 1880; O. Kenrick 1880–1884; C. Johnson 1887	Swallow 1875–1876; Eagle 1879; Gwydir 1880; Namoi 1880; Federation 1880; Pelican 1878, 1882, 1887; Trader 1878; Lancashire Witch 1887	
Princess Royal	61 tons	1870–	Gunn & King 1870; A. Ross & Co. 1875; A. Tewsley; Tonkin, Fuller & Martin 1881– Gem Navigation Co. 1909–	H. King 1870–1873; Barrenger 1872, 1873; J. Tait 1874, 1875; B. Atkins 1875, 1876; B. M. Fuller 1891; A. Hart 1895; R. Ransom 1908; C. Payne 1912; G. Alexander 1912; E. Orchard 1913; Hart 1914; D. Treacy 1926	Queen 1874; J.H.P. 1873–1878; Border Chief 1879; Mildura 1884, 1890, 1897, 1900; Empress 1897; T. P. 1909; Cobar 1910, 1913–1914; Hartley 1912; Ukee 1912, 1913, 1917	Renamed 1926 as Monada (see above).
Providence		1865–1872	Lake Alexandrina Steam Navigation Co. W. Barber 1866; Whyte, Counsell & Co.	D. Myrick 1866; R. Anderson 1866, 1867; W. Barber 1866–1868, 1870–1872; J. Davis 1872		Destroyed by explosion at Kinchega station near Menindee on River Darling. John Davis, Edward Sparks (engineer), J. Roach (fireman), Thomas Gunn (Chinese cook) and Seymour killed when boiler exploded. George Grundy, the bargemaster, was the only survivor. The boiler is still lying on the riverbank at -32.469, 142.385
Pyap	93' × 10'	1897–	C. Oliver 1897–1908; Eudunda Farmers Coop. Society 1908–1931; L. Mewett 1944	Thomson 1897; C. Oliver 1897–1908; G. A. Thamm c. 1900; Bails 1906–1911; W. Sladden 1908–1931; L. Mewett 1944		Trading steamer; lightest draught on the Murray
Queen	stern-wheeler 89 ft. × 18 ft. 127 tons	1865–	W. Barber 1865; W. Gunn 1872; Gunn & Oliver 1875– C. Oliver 1878; R. H. Taylor 1920; J. M. Brand 1924	W. Barber 1865; G. Pickhills 1866–1873; C. Elfenbein 1872; F. Blake 1873; R. Felgate 1873–1874; J. Gillon 1874–1875; C. Oliver 1875–1878, 1890, 1908; C.& O. Oliver 1911, 1919; Dubois 1915; J. M. Brand 1924	Barwon 1872; Bourke 1904, 1908, 1914, 1921, :1922, 1924, 1925	"A trading steamer that also carried passengers" (Mudie p. 226); Collided with Jane Eliza and sank 1876. Later towed Bourke, successively a floating cold storage and butcher's shop based in Renmark. "Finally burned and sank at Mypolonga" (Mudie p. 227)
Queen of the South	131' × 22' 3" 198 tons	1878–	G. B. Johnston 1879	G. B. Johnston 1878		Designed by Johnston for navigating Murray mouth.
Renmark	110' × 20'	1913	Gem Navigation Co. 1913; Arnold & Co. 1914–1916; Knox & Downs 1916; R. Reed 1948	J. Grundy 1913; H. Payne 1914, 1940; Dubois 1914; C. Payne 1914, 1916; M. Crane 1920; G. A. Thamm 1923, 1924; W. O. Searles 1924–1927; A.? R.? Johnson 1925–1927; H. McLean 1933; L. McLean 1942, 1943; J. G. Arnold 1943 (Mudie p. 133); L. F. Butcher 1944	Nelson 1914, 1919; Crowie 1915, 1916, 1920, 1922–1924; Maori 1916; Loxton 1916; Mallara 1919; Moorara 1919; Ukee 1922, 1924, 1927, 1928, 1942; Moorabin 1925; Emerald 1925	Burned and sunk at Goolwa 1951
Resolute	92' × 18' 8", 138 tons	1877–	Payne −1879; Echuca Steamship Co. 1879–1882; David, Stratton & Co. 1894	E. Barnes 1877, 1878, 1882, 1885; J. Symington 1878, 1879; G. Lindqvist 1878, 1879; J. Morris 1879, 1880; J. Christy 1881; G. Jolly 1886, 1887; A. Dusting 1889, 1890, 1899; D. Nutchey 1891–1899, 1901, 1905; W. F. Bailey 1905, 1906; H. Teschner 1905; W. Knight 1906	Confidence 1877–1881, 1888, 1896; Energetic 1878; Gunbower 1878–1879, 1882, 1906;1890, 1893–1894; Reliance 1884, 1886, 1888–1890; Echuca 1893–1894; Horace 1897; Tongo 1897; Jessie 1905, 1909; Ada 1905; J.L. Roberts 1905; Ukee 1909; Crowie 1913	
Ricketson		1876–	Barbour			Small, powerful steamer, intended for towing logs for Patent Slip sawmill, Echuca.
Rita				A. Dusting 1904		Advertised for sale at Echuca 1908
Riverina (1)	66 tons	1865–1889	J. Duncan & Co. D. Bower 1869; F. Payne 1876, 1879; J. Laing jr. 1878; George Piggins 1879– J. Montgomery −1885; M. King −1887; D Bower 1887–	E. H. Randell 1871–1873; E. Barnes 1874–1876; A. Peirce 1876; J. Morris 1877; F. C. Hansen 1878; J. Patterson 1878, 1884; T. Freeman 1879; E. Crowle 1880–1882; C. Johnson 1882; J. Newman 1882; J. Christy 1883; A. Ebery 1885	Alice 1869; Energetic 1875, 1876; Belubla 1878–1880; Native Companion 1878–1879; Advance 1879; Benduck 1880–1883; White Rose 1884; Sarah Francis 1887, 1888	Riverina and barge largely destroyed by fire 1883; Wrecked after striking snag 1884, Montgomery bankrupted. Renamed Wandering Jew (see below).
Riverina (2)		1905–	Huddart, Parker and Co.			
Riverina (3)		1965–				Previously named Trix
Riverine	Stern-wheeler 25 tons	1863–1870	Duncan & Bower	D. Bower 1863–1870		"... ran between Hay and Echuca for about three seasons then broken up."
Rob Roy	131 tons sidewheeler 88' 6 in. × 18 ft.	1876–	J. Laing sen. 1876; J & J Laing 1878; Laurence 1880; J. Wallace 1891– E. Rich & Co. –1907; Permewan, Wright 1907–1909; Gem Navigation Co. 1909–	J. Newman 1876, 1877; T. Laing 1876; J. Fyfe 1878–1880; J. McMillan 1879; E. Barnes 1880; J. Laing 1880, 1881; C. Christie 1880; C. Rolfe 1880; F. C. Hansen 1880, 1881; Laurence 1880; D. Sinclair 1881; Stevens 1881; T. Nolan 1887, 1888; B. Atkins 1893, 1896–1898, 1906; Thompson 1908; P. Sandford 1912; G. M. Mumby 1913; Harris 1914	Swan 1878, 1880, 1881, 1883, :1896, 1897, 1899–1901, 1903; Benduck 1880; Border Chief 1896–1897; Victory 1909; Ukee 1910; Mallara 1913; Albemarle 1908, 1913	Sunk 1878. There was a s.s. Rob Roy, 400 tons, working around the coast under a Captain Christie 1892–1893. A connection or simple coincidence?
Rodney	110' × 18', 150/196 tons	1875–1894	Davies & Dorward 1875; Cramsie, Bowden & Co, 1877; Davies & Dorward 1879; Permewan, Wright 1887 (Mudie p. 209)	G. Dorward 1875, 1876, :1878–1880; O. Kenrick 1877, 1878; G. Dorward jun. 1878–1884; E. Fowler 1886; J. Innes 1887; G. Lindqvist 1888–1891; J. Dickson 1891–1894	Queen 1876; Jessie 1877; Nelson 1877–1880; Victory 1887; Namoi 1889, 1890, 1892; Laurel 1891	Built in Echuca Burned by striking workers 1894.
Roma	80 ft × 20 ft, 20 hp, 60 tons	1884–1886	Farmer Bros. Whyte, Counsell 1886	E. H. Randell 1884–1886	Alice 1884; Uranus 1885, 1886	Lightest boat on the river. Destroyed by fire.
Rothbury	86 ft. × 20 ft.	1882–	W & J Robson; Munro & Co. 1888; G. B. Air 1891–1898; W. Wilson 1899–1904	J. Christy 1883, 1885; A. Ebery 1884, 1885; F. Toomer 1885–1889; T. Freeman 1890–1892; G. B. Air 1891–1899; W. Wilson 1899–1904; E. Evans 1901; W. Knight 1902; F. Tucker 1905; W. F. Bailey 1906; S. Hart 1911; M. Anderson 1911, 1940, 1948; J. G. Arnold 1912	Gunbower 1884–1885, 1887–1888; Goulburn 1887; Wyuna 1890–1894; Shamrock 1895–1896; Namoi 1899, 1906; Zulu 1901; Jessie 1906, 1909; Echuca 1909–1910; Crowie 1911; Aurora 1940	Still in use in timber trade, Mildura 1947.
Royal			A. Francis −1908; C. Dyer 1908–1922	C. Dyer 1908–1917		Shuttle service between Morgan and Renmark 1909– . Lengthened by 15 ft. in 1910
Ruby (1)	Coasting steamer 70 tons, 40 hp	1859–	Cadell; W. R. Randell	W. Barber 1859; H. King 1860; J. King		
Ruby (2)	117 tons 85' × 18' 6"	1876–	E. C. Randell; A. E. Randell 1879; King & Aldridge 1903; Gem Navigation Co. 1914	A. E. Randell 1880, 1881; W. Miers 1886–1890; L. Searles 1890; A. Barber 1891; Hart 1895, 1896; J. King 1899; H. W. King 1899	Paika 1877; Alice 1884; Isabel 1893, 1900; Pearl 1902, 1906, 1907; Uranus 1906	
Ruby (3)	133' × 18' 6"	1908	Gem Navigation Co. 1909–	H. King; J. Nutchey 1907–1916; W. Tinks 1908, 1909; J. Newman 1909, 1910; T. C. Goode 1911; A. Leishman 1911; E. Orchard 1912; Smith 1912, 1913; R. Ransom c. 1916; G. Alexander 1914, 1917, 1921; Freeman 1923; W. Henderson 1924; H. Payne 1924, 1930; W. O. Searles 1928	Paika 1911, 1912; Ukee 1913; Alice 1913, 1914	Served as a guesthouse in Mildura from c. 1938 then houseboat for Mr. and Mrs. V. Robbins from c. 1945.
Saddler	92 tons 35 hp.	1877 – c. 1907	W. McCulloch and Co. 1878– Australasian Shipping and Carrying Company −1887; J. Whyte jun. 1887– J. G. Arnold 1894–	J. Page 1878–1884; J. Dorey 1879; G. Pybus 1888–1890; R. Grundy 1893; J. G. Arnold 1894, 1901; A. Johnstone 1896; M. Crane 1902	Eagle 1878, 1885; Alice 1878, 1879; Wyuna 1878; Federation 1878, 1880; Sarah Jane 1878; Advance 1879; Tongo 1879; Paroo 1879; Willandra 1880; Darling 1880, 1881; Border Chief 1880, 1883; Pimpampa 1880; Swallow 1882; Croupier 1893, 1896; Livingstone 1896; Uranus 1896; Eclipse 1902	Described as irrigation steamer 1904; broken up 1907. M. C. Crane had barge Saddler consort of Nellie 1909.
Sapphire		1911–1916	F. W. Blundell 1911–1912; B. W. Francis 1916; W. T. Smith	F. W. Blundell 1911, 1912; B. W. Francis 1916		Trading steamer destroyed by fire 1916.
Sawmiller			Penrose & Oddy Steam Navigation and Sawmilling Co. –1909	H. Treacy 1899–1901		
Settler	stern-wheeler 100 hp, 381 tons,	1861–1864	Murray & Jackson	A. Murray 1861, 1862; P. Jackson 1862–1863		Snagged and sunk at Paringa 1862. Too large for River Murray, she failed to sail to New Zealand, and went to the Brisbane River in 1864, where she was still working in 1921.
Shamrock		1884	Matulick & Oliver 1892; F. Matulick 1895	Bill Hoff; J. Gillon 1886 (Mudie p. 231)		Low-draught steamer was destroyed by fire 1895
Shannon	110' × 18' 2" 122 tons	1877–1904	H & H. A. Gelston 1879; Reid & Heseltine 1885; T. Freeman; Mitchell 1904	H. Gelston 1880; J. Heseltine 1880, 1881, 1885; S. Heseltine 1880–1882, 1886; T. Freeman 1894–1899, 1901–1904; J. Cummins 1895; Mitchell 1904	Scottish Chief 1896; Nonpareil 1896; Belubla 1904	Caught fire and scuttled 1885 Freeman bought the damaged vessel from Heseltine and replaced her engine with that from the Stanley. Mitchell took her to Tasmania 1905.
Showboat						Tourist vessel operating from Renmark; originally sailing boat Ada and Clara.
Sir Henry Young "Sir Henry"	75 tons	1854		F. Cadell 1854; E. Robertson 1854	Wakool 1854; Murrumbidgee 1854; Eureka 1854	Appears to have made only two trips up the Murray: from Goolwa to Moorana and Windomal and return and from Port Elliot to Moorundee and return.
South Australian	152 tons	1878–1902	Whyte, Counsell & Co. 1879; G. Ritchie; Thomas & Grose 1902–	G. Pybus 1878, 1879; J. Kerr 1888, 1891–1894	Howlong 1878; Stanley 1879; Livingstone 1879, 1883; Stanley 1890, 1893; Reliance 1890; Croupier 1890	Won towing contest against Rothbury 1892; Operated by flour miller on Tam o' Shanter creek from 1902.
Struggler			George H. Risby 1888–1889	Robert Isherwood 1901; Joy 1918; T. Bynon (when?)		
Sturt	length 93' 60 hp.	1856–1890	Chubb, Hill & Co, Acraman, Main. Lindsay, & Co. Heggaton & Pickhills 1876– Pickhills & Co. 1885	A. McCoy 1856–1858; Davidson 1857; W. Luxon 1859–1863; Blake 1877; G. Pickhills 1882, 1885–1888, :1890	Lady of the Lake 1857; Hume 1859	Sister vessel to Leichardt. Stuck in Darling 1885–1886; Hit snag, sunk 1890
Success	129 tons	1877–1957	Westwood & Air 1877; Dashwood & Air 1879; Randell & Air; T. Freeman 1905; Staley & Connell 1911; Olsen 1918; Francis & Tinks 1922; Bailey & Sons 1926–1934	G. Air 1877–1895; E. Barnes 1881; E. C. Randell 1881, 18821886 (Mudie p. 109); T. Freeman 1889, 1891–1893, :1897, 1902–1909; W. Thompson 1889, 1890; C. P.? J.? Johnson 1891–1903; Johnston 1892? check D. Sinclair 1892–1894, 1901; J. Cummins 1896; W. Tinks 1922; V. Byrne 1926, 1929, 1931, :1933–1935; W. J. Bailey 1928, 1931, 1935; F. Weaver 1935; C. Cantwell 1941; H. Hogg 1956; Pollard 1956 (Mudie p. 111)	Energetic 1878; Border Chief 1879; Mildura 1877–1882; Paika 1881; Benduck 1882; Nonpareil 1882, 1884, 1886, :1890, 1902; Scottish Chief 1888–1889; Belubla 1896; Ormond 1919, 1922; Croupier 1926; Vega 1956	In 1906 she made the Wilcannia to Wentworth trip in a record 40 hours. Undergoing restoration at Echuca, Victoria.
Sunbeam			E. H. Dodd jr.	Johnson 1899; Randell 1910; E. H. Dodd jr. (when?)		Small trading steamer of very low draught; carried small Government party 1897, dried fruit, and fishing and shooting parties until at least 1910.
Surprise				W. F. Bailey 1892	Annie 1891	
Tarella	100' × 20'	1897–	A. H. Landseer 1897 Gem Navigation Co. 1909– South Australian Government, Irrigation Dept. 1919–1948; Murray Shipping Ltd. 1948–1948; L. M. Arnold 1953(to be confirmed)	J. Grundy 1897–1909; E. Orchard 1911; H. McLean 1911, 1912; R. Potter 1913; R. Smith 1914; Thompson 1914; A. F. Porter 1919–1923; Smith 1934; G. Makin 1938	Empress 1901, 1913; Croupier 1902; Susan 1903, 1904, 1906; Bourke 1904; Cobar 1905, 1912–1913; Murchison 1909; Nonpareil 1908; Ukee 1909; Alice 1909; Mallara 1910; Victory 1910; Isabel 1910; Nonpareil 1912; Mary Ann 1913; Emily 1913; Pearl 1914; Florence Annie 1914; Hartley 1914; Albemarle 1914; Albion 1947–1948	Barge Nonpareil was destroyed by fire near Wilcannia 1912. She was used to transport two gigantic Humphrey pumps to Cobdogla in 1923. Decommissioned by Murray Shipping Ltd. in 1948 having stripped her of all machinery and then resold. Towed by P.S. Gem in 1948 to a permanent mooring approx. 5 km above Mannum S.A. Used out as fishermans shack by various owners until refloated for rebuilding and recommissioning in 2014.
Telegraph	62 tons, 90 ft. × 17' 6ins.	1866–1875	Lake Alexandrina Steam Navigation Company 1866–	J. Tinks 1866–1875; W. Wolter 1870; T. Johnston 1870, 1871; W. Mathews 1871	Darling 1872	Mail steamer operated Milang to Meningie (Mudie p. 84); Converted to barge 1875
Teviot	Side-wheeler 57' × 12' 20 tons	1865–	G. Smith 1865–1868; H. King 1868–	J. Smith 1865–1869; H. King 1868, 1870		Engines transferred to Princess Royal 1870.
Thistle	151 tons 105 ft. × 19 ft.	1877–	Blair & McGrouther	R. G. Lewen 1879, 1880; C. Schmedje sr. 1879	Shamrock 1880	One of the largest steamers; ousted by competition from lighter, shallow draught boats such as Emma, Nile and Mayflower
Timor				J. P. Willoughby 1890, 1891		Small steamer repaired in Renmark 1894.
Tolarno		1879–	Andrew Willcock; Gem Navigation Co. George Donaldson 1902; Donaldson, Coburn & Knox 1901; Donaldson Ltd. 1910; Knox & Downs 1916	L. Searles 1880; R. Grundy 1893, 1894, 1902,1906,1913, 1914, 1916, 1917, 1919; L. Mewett 1924; L. McLean 1924, 1925; R. Pendle 1926	Croupier 1889, 1893; Uranus 1892–1894, 1899, 1901, :1903–1909; Myee 1910–1913; Moorabin 1916–1917, :1920, 1924; Ukee 1922, 1923; Crowie 1924; Mallara 1926; Emerald 1926	light draught steamer built by Willcock and operated by him and his father, Oliver Willcock.
Trafalgar "Traf"	steel deck 105' 7" × 18' 158/228 tons	1877–	W. J & W. E. Davies 1877–1879; Davies and Son 1889	W. J. Davies 1877; D. Bower 1877–1886; W. Rowlands 1882; W. E. Davies 1888; C. Cantwell 1887–1899	Sarah Jane 1878–1882, 1885, 1886, :1889–1891; Pocahontas 1878; Nelson 1885; Eagle 1888–1890; Horace 1891; Jessie 1895; Echuca 1897; Namoi 1929	Later passenger service between Swan Hill and Mildura. Sold to a South Australian company 1917.
Trio		1872–		Shetliff 1872–		
Trix		1943–		W. H. Drage 1950–		Became 100-passenger showboat steamer out of Renmark 1943; renamed Riverina 1965.
Tyro	72 tons	1872–1926	R. N. Tolley & H. King 1872– S. Shetliff & Son 1875; R. M. Randell 1884– G. & S. Shetliff 1879	S. Shetliff 1872–1878; F. C. Hansen 1880; R. M. Randell 1897, 1899, :1904, 1909; G. A. Thamm 1914; Dubois 1915	Golconda 1873; Union 1874, 1875, 1880, 1881; Blanche 1874; Confidence 1880; Queen 1880; Loxton 1915–1916	Shuttled between Murray Bridge and Mannum from 1884 to at least 1917. Largely destroyed by boiler explosion November 1897. Randell and engineer Trounson were badly scalded. The Tyro returned to service the following year. She was destroyed by fire at Murray Bridge in 1926.
Ulonga	111'	1912–	Permewan, Wright & Co. Murray River Shipping Co. W. O. Searles 1937; R. Reed 1937–	C. Cantwell 1913; H. Kelly 1915, 1918; D. Nutchey 1930–1933; C. Haines 1935, 1936; R. Reed 1937–	Jessie 1913–1915; Namoi 1914; Echuca 1918, 1920, 1922; J.L. Roberts 1913, 1915, 1916, :1918–1921, 1923–1928	Built as barge Ulonga 1911, converted to steamer 1912. Collided with Invincible 1926. Carting firewood 1937; Burnt to the waterline 1937.
Undaunted	28 tons	1875–	J. T. Laing; F. Payne 1876; Gurney −1894; T. C. Goode 1906	Church 1875, 1876; J. Morris 1875, 1876; E. Barnes 1876; J. Fyfe 1877; D. Sinclair 1877, 1881; W. Hampson 1878, 1879, 1881; J. Laing 1879; E. W. Randell (when?)	Energetic 1876; Only Son 1876–1878; Benduck 1878–1879	Barge snagged and sunk 1879. Ended as hawking steamer on Darling, then converted to barge for City of Oxford around 1904 by T. C. Goode.
Ventura			E. Dodd 1909–1911; C. P. Allen 1911–1916	Dodd 1909–1911; W. R. F. Hanckel 1909	Walgett 1916	
Venus			G. Ritchie 1906–	G. Ritchie 1906, 1907		Excursion steamer; successor to Alexandra (see above) received unfavourable reviews,
Vesta	29 tons		T. Brakenridge; H. Williams 1879	S. Shetliff 1868–1871; B. M. Fuller 1870; W. Wolter 1870; T. Brakenridge 1871–1872; C. Elfenbein 1871–1873; J. Dodd 1872; W. Mathews 1872, 1873; W. Barber 1873; W. Stewart 1873–1875; W. Kerr 1874; Wilkes (Wilks?) 1877, 1879	Satellite 1874	
Victor	79 tons 95' × 15'	1877–	W. Barber; Barber & Kirkpatrick 1879; A. Martin & Co. 1896	W. Barber 1881; E. H. Golding 1890, 1891, 1894; A. Martin 1896; J. Frayne 1903	Laurel 1879, 1881, 1882, 1896; Venus 1902–1903	Barge Laurel destroyed by fire 1896. Hawking steamer, burnt at Murray Bridge.
Victoria	114 tons 85 ft. × 15 ft. iron framed	1864–	Murray River Steam Navigation Co. Upper Murray Steam Navigation Co. Leonard & Co. Wagga Wagga Steam Navigation Co. 1869– Wm. McCulloch & Co. 1878–1884	G. Dorward 1866–1869; Adamson 1869; J. Ritchie jr. 1870–1873; A. Peirce 1873–1875; R. G. Lewen 1876–1878; J. Burgess 1878, 1884; E. Barnes 1879; W. Pullar 1879; G. Jolly 1881; J. Hart 1885, 1886, 1888–1891; Dodd 1893; J. Wallace 1896, 1903	Wangaratta 1867; Moama 1868; Pocahontas 1869–1871; Moira 1873; Darling 1878; Tongo 1878–1879, 1904; Federation 1879; Advance 1881; McIntyre 1896; Cobar 1889, 1896, 1898, 1899, 1901; Tongo 1904; Queen 1904; Uranus 1910, 1911	
Viola		1898–	W. Wilson 1933	John Colebatch 1902		Spent most of her existence as fishing launch. or chartered by Thomas Goode.
W. F. B.			Bailey & Sons 1933	W. J. Bailey 1922, 1923, 1926, :1929, 1931; F. Weaver 1933	Annie 1922, 1923; Horace 1931	Named for W. F. Bailey; Weekly trips Morgan to Renmark in 1923; Originally Eric; later Bejo (Mudie p. 183) (for B.J.O.?)
Wagga Wagga "Wagga"	86 tons		R. Barbour 1879; G. H. Risby; James Roach & Co. 1905	T. Bynon sr. 1876, 1885; T. Bynon 1903–1905, 1912, 1916; D. Sinclair 1878, 1879; J. T. Laing 1880; G. H. Risby 1888, 1889; R. Ransom 1890	Wakool 1876; Native Companion 1978; Whaler 1885, 1892, 1904; Goulburn 1890; Namoi 1890	Became trading vessel 1878
Wahgunyah	58 tons	1866–	J. Foord 1866–1868; Hilson 1869; Permewan & Hodge 1879	F. Foord 1866–1868; J. Page 1869–1877		Collision with Cumberoona 1869; bargehand Skinner drowned. Page totally exonerated.
Waikerie	83' × 14' 6"	1911–1929	Francis & Tinks; Bailey & Sons 1926–1929	A. Francis 1911; W. Tinks 1911–1926; G. A. Thamm c. 1911; F. Weaver 1926	Pearl 1920; Merle 1920; Melbourne 1920; Horace 1921	Destroyed by fire 1929
Wakool	wood hull, 70 tons	c. 1860	F. Cadell (c. 1860–1920 )	J. Mace 1860; J. Ritchie sr. 1863	Mitta Mitta 1860	Originally barge; converted to steamer c. 1860. Sent to New Zealand 1920; wrecked at Hokitika along with the Bruce and Waipara.
Wandering Jew	72' × 14' 4" 66 tons	1891–1914	D. Berger; G. White 1910–1914	G. White 1903, 1908, 1910–1914	Sarah Frewens 1899	Trading steamer, previously named Riverina, she was gutted by fire at Bourke 1893; Destroyed by fire near Brewarrina; It is likely that her barge Sarah Frewens was the Sarah Francis renamed.
Wanera	112' × 20' 9"	1910–1985	Permewan, Wright and Co. 1910; Murray Shipping Ltd. 1918; R. J. Johnson 1933, 1936; Brennan 1938	H. Kelly 1910; L. Wagner 1983; G. Makin 1929; W. Henderson 1930; A. Haynes 1931; W. H. Drage 1935; R. Johnson 1936; L. McLean c. 1938; J. Searles 1952, 1953; E. R. Randell 1953; W. S. Carlyon (when?)	J.L. Roberts 1911, 1912, 1913, :1920, 1921, 1926, 1928, 1931; Namoi 1910, 1911; Ada 1912; Echuca 1913; Jessie 1915; Mallara 1920; Moorara 1922, 1924, 1928; Moorabin 1930, 1936	Built as barge T.P. (for Tom Permewan), converted to steamer and carried record load 450 tons 1910. Became houseboat at Renmark for Lorry and Gwen Brennan 1939 destroyed by fire January 1985
Waradgery	stern-wheeler 151 tons	1865–	H. Leonard 1876; Wilson & Glew 1886; Glew & Fulford 1889; Gem Navigation Co. 1909–	W. R. Randell; F. Foord 1868–1872; W. Sugden 1869; G. Dorward 1872, 1874; Williams 1874; J. Burgess 1874; F. Toomer 1874–1884; B. M. Fuller 1878; W. Thomson 1879; A. Glew 1887, 1888; J. Fulford 1889; A. E. Randell 1890–1892; C. Bock 1893; J. Tait 1894; W. Porter 1895; J. Randell 1907	Moama 1866; Wangaratta 1869–1871; Symmetry 1871; Waterwitch 1872, 1873; Darling 1874; Paroo 1876, 1878, 1879; Pocahontas 1878; Alice 1878–1879; Gwydir 1878–1879; Pimpampa 1887; Willandra 1889	Advertised 1876 as "Henry Leonard's new steamer". Barge Willandra sank 1889 and crewman Robert Johnstone drowned.
Wardell		1873	Public Works department (Vic. govt.); L. Godegast 1877	Henry Thorpe 1879–1884, :1888, 1892; W. Bulled 1893; Lubert 1909		Snagging steamer, probably named for W. W. Wardell of the Victorian Public Works Department. R. J. Shelley supervised operations from 1873 but it is not clear whether he commanded the boat. Her barge was later used as a boat shed.
Warrego		1864–	Oliver & Rankin 1865; Oliver & Walker 1865	C. Oliver sr.	Rendlesham 1866	replaced by Prince Alfred
Wave		1903	Donaldson, Coburn & Knox			brought merchandise to Wilcannia 1903 only.
Wentworth	110' × 23' (100' × 19' 6" in 1886) 99 tons / 123 tons	1864–	A. Kirkpatrick 1864; Harrold Brothers 1865, 1866; R. & B. Varcoe; Leonard & Symington 1869; Johnston & Murphy 1870; Geyer & Creek 1873; W. Bowring and Co. G. Johnston & Co. 1875, 1879	J. Smythe 1864–1867; B. Varcoe 1866, 1867; W. Luxon 1866–1868; G. B. Johnston 1870, 1873, 1876; J. Gillon 1870–1875; James Barclay 1872; W. Dickson 1874–1876; J. Packer 1878, 1887, 1889, 1901	Miriam 1865; Menindie 1866, 1869, 1871–1875; Unknown 1870, 1872, 1873; Mitta Mitta 1874; Waterwitch 1876; J and M 1875, 1879; Reliance 1876; Unknown 1879, 1881; Gwydir 1880; McIntyre 1881; Barwon 1881 :Three barges together!	
White Swan	85' × 22' 9"	1882	Buzza 1882	Buzza 1882		In March 1882 Buzza announced she would have engine from Emily Jane. After 20 June 1882 no further mention of White Swan is to be found in newspapers, though a week later Buzza captained a steamer named Emily Jane, so it is possible that White Swan had become the second Emily Jane.
Wilcannia	107' x 18'6"; 144 tons	1874–1915	J. Tinks 1874; W. Tinks; Anderson & Hoad; J. G. Arnold 1911– Cuttle & Co. 1924	J. Tinks 1876, 1879–1889; W. Tinks 1892; M. Anderson 1906; W. R. F. Hanckel 1911; Grundy 1911, 1912; M. Patterson 1915; G. A. Thamm 1917; S. Watson 1921; J. Nutchey 1923, 1924	Rosa 1911, 1913; Crowie 1912, 1913, 1914, 1917; Nelson 1920; Moorabin 1921; Emerald 1921	Engines originally from Telegraph; Wrecked 1915 but still running 1924.
William Davies / Wm. Davies	78 ft × 10 ft.	1894–	Permewan, Wright 1894– Donaldson, Coburn & Knox 1901; Permewan, Wright and Co. Gem Navigation Co. 1913	J. Innes 1894; Dickson 1894; P. Westergaard 1895–1902; A. Nutchey 1902, 1904–1906, :1908; Daley 1910; W. Bailey 1912; S. Rossiter 1913; B. Atkins 1913; Hart 1914; E. Orchard 1914; H. McLean 1916; N. McLean 1920; Rice 1920; C. Cantwell 1921; G. Alexander 1923; V. Byrne 1924; W. O. Searles 1924; E. Hill 1925; W. H. Drage 1926; L. McLean 1929, 1930	Nelson 1894, 1896; Horace 1894, 1896; Eagle 1894–1896, 1898; Namoi 1895, 1897; J.L. Roberts 1896, 1898, 1899, :1903, 1906–1908, 1922; Paroo 1894; Jessie 1894, 1895, 1905; Maori 1895–1897, 1903, 1909; Echuca 1896; Confidence 1898; Paragon 1899, 1901; Ada 1900; Ormond 1902; Sprite 1903; Gunbower 1906; Emily 1908; Albemarle 1910, 1912; Emerald 1910, 1912, 1913; Moorara 1910; Mallara 1912, 1917; Queen 1913; Mary Ann 1913; Hartley 1913–1914, 1923; Ukee 1914, 1916; Annie 1916; Uranus 1930	Named for Captain William J. Davies (c. 1830–1903). Bargehand Anderson fell into hold and was killed 1900; Engine exploded August 1920 but no casualties. Mate William "Gus" Haynes lost overboard 1925; Ship's cook Thomas Baird lost overboard 1921. Bargehand Alex Harris drowned 1930.
William Randell / Wm. R. Randell			Gem Navigation Co. 1909–	Hart 1907; Weston 1910; P. Sandford 1911; H. McLean 1912; R. Potter 1914, 1916; G. Knight 1935	Susan; Alice 1912; Murchison 1907, 1908, 1909, 1912, 1913; Ukee 1909, 1910; Uranus 1912; Alice 1914; Hartley 1916; Moorara 1916	Originally Pioneer (see above).

== See also ==
- Murray-Darling steamboat people
- List of Darling River distances
- List of Murray River crossings
- List of Murray River distances
- List of Murrumbidgee River distances
- Murray–Darling basin includes useful chart of tributaries

== Notes ==
1. Spelling : Information in this article has mostly been gleaned from newspaper reports. Barbour, Bower, Christie, Davies, Dickson, Hampson, Hansen, Johnston, Lindqvist, Maultby, Miers, Pickhills, Rossiter, Schmedje, Searles, Tait, Theisz, Westergaard (all prominent people) often appeared in print as Barber, Bowers, Christie, Davis, Dixon, Hampton, Hanson, Johnson, Lindquist, Maltby, Myers, Pickels, Rossitter (or Rosseter), Smidgee (or Schmedge), Searle, Tate, Theiz and Westergard. The firm of Johnson and Davies was spelled four different ways in their own advertisements. Boats were given the same treatment. The barge Tongo was often written "Tonga" and Goldsbrough often "Goldsborough". Although the owners should have known better, the vessel generally named Lady Augusta was actually registered as Lady Agusta and Leichardt was presumably (mis)named for the explorer Ludwig Leichhardt (1813 – c. 1848). The barge Rabbie Burns appears to have metamorphosed into Robbie Burns around 1880. The steamer here spelled "Ferret" may have been registered "Ferrett" – more information is needed. The town now (and here) spelled Narrandera was once mostly "Narandera", a spelling tenaciously retained by its newspaper.

2. Bracketed numbers after some boats' names are intended for clarity and have no meaning outside this article.

3. Dates of service alongside names of boats and their owners and captains are from contemporary newspaper reports, which varied greatly in depth of information supplied. They would therefore not necessarily reflect the vessel or person's full period of service. Dates refer to service on the Murray system; some craft and most skippers had earlier or later service elsewhere.

4. In the interests of simplicity, honorifics (S.S., P.S., M.V. etc.) have been omitted from boat names in the first column.

5. Vessels were frequently modified to take advantage of changing trade requirements; hence burdens, dimensions, etc. quoted may appear inconsistent. Location of the paddles in paddle-wheel boats is a major design consideration: stern-wheelers are faster than side-wheelers and can navigate a narrower passage, but are less manoeuvrable, and are less adapted to towing a barge. Stern-wheelers were not uncommon on the Murray, but unsuited to the bends of the Darling. Boats were occasionally converted from one style to the other. A single central paddle-wheel (as in Gemini) had navigation advantages at the expense of load capacity and convenience, especially in maintaining an even keel. A single rear paddle-wheel, as in Mississippi steamers, proved unpractical.

6. Ownership of vessels was not often reported in the press, which accounts for this column being largely incomplete. The major companies (Wm. McCulloch & Co., Cramsie, Bowden & Co., E. Rich & Co., etc.) as well as owning vessels, also acted as agents for private owners, who may have been their captains, or absentee investors.

7. Almost without exception, no master or vessel was employed on the river throughout the year. In non-drought years shipping activity might be expected to run (give or take a month) from around June (with the winter rains) to December (with the snow melt).

8. "Lower Lakes" here refers to Lakes Alexandrina and Albert, between Goolwa and the Lower Murray. Towns on the Lower Lakes include Milang, Wellington and Meningie

== Sources ==
- "Riverina: Its Trade and Resources No. 1". South Australian Register. Adelaide. 15 January 1879. p. 5 – via National Library of Australia. Other articles in this series are:

- "Riverina: Its Trade and Resources No. 2". South Australian Register. Adelaide. 20 January 1879. p. 6 – via National Library of Australia.
- "Riverina: Its Trade and Resources No. 3". South Australian Register. Adelaide. 25 January 1879. p. 6 – via National Library of Australia.
- "Riverina: Its Trade and Resources No. 4". South Australian Register. Adelaide. 31 January 1879. p. 5 – via National Library of Australia.
- "Riverina: Its Trade and Resources No. 6". Wagga Wagga Advertiser. NSW. 22 February 1879. p. 1 Supplement – via National Library of Australia.
- "Riverina: Its Trade and Resources No. 8". South Australian Register. Adelaide. 13 February 1879. p. 1 Supplement – via National Library of Australia.
- "Riverina: Its Trade and Resources No. 9". South Australian Register. Adelaide. 17 February 1879. p. 1 Supplement – via National Library of Australia.
- "Riverina: Its Trade and Resources No. 10". South Australian Register. Adelaide. 20 February 1879. p. 1 Supplement – via National Library of Australia.
- "Riverina: Its Trade and Resources No. 11". South Australian Register. Adelaide. 26 February 1879. p. 6 – via National Library of Australia.

- "The Trade of the Murray". South Australian Register. Adelaide. 22 December 1856. p. 2 – via National Library of Australia.
- Phillips, Peter J. Riverboat Ways: Australia's inland paddlewheelers Greenhouse Publications, Richmond, Victoria 1983 ISBN 0 909104 63 8
- Mudie, Ian Riverboats, Sun Books, Melbourne 1965

== Literature ==
- Newland, Simpson Paving the Way
- Brady, E. J. River Rovers
- Bedford, Randolph (yet to find)
