= List of Murrumbidgee River distances =

This is a table of river distances of various locations (c. 1930) along the Murrumbidgee River upstream from Hay, New South Wales. Negative values indicate distances downstream.

Note that river distances are by their nature highly imprecise, will always be greater than straight line distances, and frequently greater than road distances.

Place	Side of river	River distance
Gundagai		432 miles (700 km)
Wagga Wagga		350 miles (560 km)
Yarragundy		325 miles (520 km)
Currawarna	North	300 miles (480 km)
Yiorkibitto		275 miles (440 km)
Grong Grong		238 miles (380 km)
Narrandera	North	225 miles (360 km)
Yanco Creek	South	211 miles (340 km)
Yanco Station	North	202 miles (330 km)
Gogeldrie	North	192 miles (310 km)
Whitton	North	186 miles (300 km)
Tubbo	South	174 miles (280 km)
Cuba	North	168 miles (270 km)
Darlington Point	North	161 miles (260 km)
Benerembah	North	144 miles (230 km)
Old Bringagee	North	134 miles (220 km)
Kerarbury	South	131 miles (210 km)
Groongal Woolshed (Bringagee)	North	131 miles (210 km)
Wyvern	North	116 miles (190 km)
Toganmain	South	109 miles (180 km)
Groongal	North	103 miles (170 km)
Carrathool	North	85 miles (140 km)
Campbell's Landing	South	78 miles (130 km)
Uardry	North	71 miles (114 km)
Burrabogie	South	49 miles (79 km)
Eli Elwah	South	20 miles (32 km)
Illillawa	North	18 miles (29 km)
Hay	North	0
Mungadal	South	−5 miles (−8 km)
Benduck	North	−24 miles (−39 km)
Pevensey	South	−27.5 miles (−44 km)
Elwood (Horton's Landing)	South	−31 miles (−50 km)
Toogimbie	South	−42.5 miles (−68 km)
Canoon	North	−42.5 miles (−68 km)
Campbell's Landing	North	−53.5 miles (−86 km)
Peters Landing	South	−54 miles (−87 km)
Horton's Landing	South	−58 miles (−93 km)
Willcox's Landing	North	−61 miles (−98 km)
Jesse Jones' Landing	South	−64.5 miles (−104 km)
Maude	North	−68 miles (−109 km)
Gelam	North	−81 miles (−130 km)
Nap Nap	South	−85 miles (−140 km)
Tupra Landing	North	−98 miles (−160 km)
Waugorah Wool Shed	South	−124 miles (−200 km)
Burgess Landing	South	−127 miles (−200 km)
Glen Dee	North	−131 miles (−210 km)
Red Bank	North	−137 miles (−220 km)
Balranald	North	−205 miles (−330 km)
Yanga Wool Shed	South	−210 miles (−340 km)
Queechy Wool Scour	North	−214 miles (−340 km)
Canally Station	South	−235 miles (−380 km)
Canally Wool Shed	North	−245 miles (−390 km)
Murray River junction		−287 miles (−460 km)
Euston	North	−362 miles (−580 km)
Mildura	South	−509 miles (−820 km)
Darling junction		−341 miles (−550 km)
Renmark	West	−702 miles (−1,130 km)
Morgan	West	−856 miles (−1,380 km)
Mannum	West	−961 miles (−1,550 km)
Murray Mouth		−1,055 miles (−1,700 km)

== See also ==
- Distances along the Murrumbidgee, a list of distances between towns.
- List of Murray River distances
- List of Darling River distances
