= List of Murray River distances =

This is a table of river distances of various locations along the Murray River upstream from Echuca, Victoria and Mannum, South Australia, arguably the two most important river ports in the steamboat era. Negative values indicate distances downstream. Many of the places listed are of historic interest only.

Note that river distances are by their nature highly imprecise, will always be greater than straight line distances, and frequently greater than road distances.

Place (Side of river)	River distance from Echuca	River distance from Mannum	River distance from Goolwa	River distance from Mouth
Albury (N)	310 miles (500 km)	1,285 miles (2,070 km)		
Wodonga (S)	310 miles (500 km)	1,285 miles (2,070 km)		
Jindera Hill	298 miles (480 km)	1,273 miles (2,050 km)		
Howlong (N)	267 miles (430 km)	1,242 miles (2,000 km)		
Quat Qata	257 miles (410 km)	1,232 miles (1,980 km)		
Corowa (N)	237 miles (380 km)	1,192 miles (1,920 km)		
Wahgunyah (S)	237 miles (380 km)	1,192 miles (1,920 km)		
Collondina	203 miles (330 km)	1,178 miles (1,900 km)		
Ovens River Junction (S)	201 miles (320 km)	1,176 miles (1,890 km)		
Hells Gates	187 miles (300 km)	1,162 miles (1,870 km)		
Mulwala (N)	180 miles (290 km)	1,155 miles (1,860 km)		
Yarrawonga Weir; Lake Mulwala				1992 km
Boomanoomoona	155 miles (250 km)	1,130 miles (1,820 km)		
Barooga (N)	145 miles (230 km)	1,120 miles (1,800 km)		
Cobram (S)	145 miles (230 km)	1,120 miles (1,800 km)		
Tocumwal (N)	116 miles (190 km)	1,091 miles (1,760 km)		
Ulupna	104 miles (170 km)	1,079 miles (1,740 km)		
Wharpararanah	101 miles (160 km)	1,076 miles (1,730 km)		
Yieliema	77 miles (120 km)	1,052 miles (1,690 km)		
Edward River Junction	60 miles (97 km)	1,035 miles (1,670 km)		
Barmah	50 miles (80 km)	1,025 miles (1,650 km)		
Goulburn (N)	36 miles (58 km)	1,011 miles (1,630 km)		
Moama (N)	10 miles (16 km)	985 miles (1,590 km)		
Echuca (S)	0	975 miles (1,570 km)		
Wharparilla	−4 miles (−6.4 km)	971 miles (1,560 km)		
Dead Horse Point	−24 miles (−39 km)	951 miles (1,530 km)		
Perricoota	−38 miles (−61 km)	937 miles (1,510 km)		
Lock 26 (Torumbarry)				1638 km
Toorangabby	−56 miles (−90 km)	919 miles (1,480 km)		
Thule Creek	−90 miles (−140 km)	885 miles (1,420 km)		
Clump Bend	−117 miles (−190 km)	858 miles (1,380 km)		
Gunbower Creek Junction	−119 miles (−190 km)	856 miles (1,380 km)		
Campbell's Island	−126 miles (−200 km)	849 miles (1,370 km)		
Gunnawarra Hut	−136 miles (−220 km)	839 miles (1,350 km)		
Gunn	−142 miles (−230 km)	823 miles (1,320 km)		
Pental Island	−158 miles (−250 km)	817 miles (1,310 km)		
Melool Shed	−159 miles (−260 km)	816 miles (1,310 km)		
Funnel Shed	−169 miles (−270 km)	806 miles (1,300 km)		
Wood's Station	−172 miles (−280 km)	803 miles (1,290 km)		
Murray Downs	−190 miles (−310 km)	785 miles (1,260 km)		
Loddon River junction (S)				
Swan Hill (S)	−193 miles (−310 km)	782 miles (1,260 km)		
Tyntynder	−213 miles (−340 km)	762 miles (1,230 km)		
Nyah (S)	−223 miles (−360 km)	752 miles (1,210 km)		
Tooley	−231 miles (−370 km)	744 miles (1,200 km)		
Piangil / Pyangil (S)	−241 miles (−390 km)	734 miles (1,180 km)		
Tooleybuc (N)	−245 miles (−390 km)	730 miles (1,170 km)		
Bitch and Pups	−256 miles (−410 km)	719 miles (1,160 km)		
Wakool (N)	−267 miles (−430 km)	708 miles (1,140 km)		
Windomal	−278 miles (−450 km)	697 miles (1,120 km)		
Narung	−285 miles (−460 km)	690 miles (1,110 km)		
Riley's	−292 miles (−470 km)	683 miles (1,100 km)		
Murrumbidgee River Junction (N)	−296 miles (−480 km)	679 miles (1,090 km)		
Youngera	−321 miles (−520 km)	654 miles (1,050 km)		
Meilman	−337 miles (−540 km)	638 miles (1,030 km)		
Humbang	−358 miles (−580 km)	617 miles (990 km)		
Euston (N)	−381 miles (−610 km)	594 miles (960 km)		
Lock 15 (Euston)				1110 km
Gell's Island	−397 miles (−640 km)	578 miles (930 km)		
Ki	−413 miles (−660 km)	562 miles (900 km)		
Kulkyne	−428 miles (−690 km)	547 miles (880 km)		
Bretta	−441 miles (−710 km)	534 miles (860 km)		
Tapaulin Station	−448 miles (−720 km)	527 miles (850 km)		
Tapaulin Island	−455 miles (−730 km)	520 miles (840 km)		
Iraak (was Carwarp)	−472 miles (−760 km)	503 miles (810 km)		
Mallee Cliffs (Paringi)	−483 miles (−780 km)	492 miles (790 km)		
McFarlane's Reef (Paringi)	−489 miles (−790 km)	486 miles (780 km)		
McFarlane's Station	−497 miles (−800 km)	478 miles (770 km)		
Gol Gol Creek (Gol Gol) (N)	−512 miles (−820 km)	463 miles (750 km)		
Mildura (S)	−518 miles (−830 km)	457 miles (740 km)		
Lock 11 (Mildura)				878 km
Cowana	−538 miles (−870 km)	437 miles (700 km)		
Williams Station	−550 miles (−890 km)	425 miles (680 km)		
Wentworth (N)	−551 miles (−890 km)	424 miles (680 km)	617 miles (990 km)	
Lock 10 (Wentworth)				825 km
Neilpo			610 miles (980 km)	
Darling River Junction (N)	−560 miles (−900 km)	415 miles (670 km)		
Anabranch			598 miles (960 km)	
McLennan's			595 miles (960 km)	
Moorna	−581 miles (−940 km)	394 miles (630 km)	583 miles (940 km)	
Moothree			574 miles (920 km)	
Kulnine Station	−589 miles (−950 km)	386 miles (620 km)		
Lock 9 (Kulnine)				765 km
Crozier's Rocks			567 miles (910 km)	
Ned's Corner Station	−600 miles (−970 km)	375 miles (600 km)	554 miles (890 km)	
Whambalao Island			552 miles (890 km)	
Lock 8 (Wangumma)				726 km
Rufus Creek	−633 miles (−1,020 km)	342 miles (550 km)		
Lock 7 (Rufus River)				697 km
Watminga			506 miles (810 km)	
Devils Elbow				681 km
Warakoo Sandbar				677 km
Pollards Cutting				667 km
Gal Gal (same as Cal Lal?)			486 miles (780 km)	
Wompinni Station (old Cal Lal Police Station) (N)				659 km
River Lindsay Junction			483 miles (780 km)	
Higgins Cutting				653 km
NSW–SA Border	−664 miles (−1,070 km)	311 miles (500 km)		
Victoria–SA Border	−671 miles (−1,080 km)	304 miles (490 km)		
Old Customs House (S)				636 km
Isle of Man (N)	−694 miles (−1,120 km)	301 miles (480 km)	466 miles (750 km)	
Lock 6 (Murtho) (S)				620 km
Chowilla (N)	−689 miles (−1,110 km)	286 miles (460 km)	451 miles (730 km)	
Murtho Station; Murthoo (E)	−692 miles (−1,110 km)	283 miles (460 km)	444 miles (710 km)	
Ral Ral Creek (entrance) (W)	−699 miles (−1,120 km)	276 miles (440 km)		
Ral Ral Creek (exit) (W)	−714 miles (−1,150 km)	261 miles (420 km)		
Renmark (W)	−715 miles (−1,150 km)	260 miles (420 km)		
Paringa Station (E)	−716 miles (−1,150 km)	259 miles (420 km)	402 miles (650 km)	
Lock 5 (Renmark)				562 km
Tintara (same as Tin Tree Bend?)			400 miles (640 km)	
Tin Tree Bend	−719 miles (−1,160 km)	256 miles (410 km)		
Muckle Muk Island	−725 miles (−1,170 km)	250 miles (400 km)		
Bookmark (same as Calperum?)			382 miles (610 km)	
Calperum Station	−733 miles (−1,180 km)	242 miles (390 km)		
Lyrup (S)	−735 miles (−1,180 km)	240 miles (390 km)		
Spring Cart Gully	−742 miles (−1,190 km)	233 miles (370 km)		
Berri (N)	−742 miles (−1,190 km)	233 miles (370 km)		
Lock 4 (Bookpurnong)	−748 miles (−1,200 km)	227 miles (370 km)		516 km
Bookpurnong	−748 miles (−1,200 km)	227 miles (370 km)		
Katarapko Creek / Cragg's Creek (entrance)	−750 miles (−1,210 km)	225 miles (360 km)		
Rilli Island	−758 miles (−1,220 km)	217 miles (350 km)		
Media Island	−763 miles (−1,230 km)	212 miles (340 km)		
Loxton (S)	−765 miles (−1,230 km)	210 miles (340 km)		
Kapunda Island	−765 miles (−1,230 km)	210 miles (340 km)		
Katarapko Creek / Cragg's Creek (exit)	−770 miles (−1,240 km)	205 miles (330 km)		
Sugarloaf Hill	−770 miles (−1,240 km)	205 miles (330 km)		
Pyap Station (old)	−771 miles (−1,240 km)	204 miles (330 km)	345 miles (560 km)	
Pyap (S)				
Cobdogla Woolshed	−776 miles (−1,250 km)	199 miles (320 km)		
Pyap Hut	−779 miles (−1,250 km)	196 miles (320 km)		
New Residence (W)				
Nyne's Island	−785 miles (−1,260 km)	190 miles (310 km)		
Moorook Island	−788 miles (−1,270 km)	187 miles (300 km)		
Moorook South (W)	−788 miles (−1,270 km)	187 miles (300 km)		
Cobdogla (E)	−794 miles (−1,280 km)	181 miles (290 km)	324 miles (520 km)	
Thurk Island	−797 miles (−1,280 km)	178 miles (290 km)		
Kingston-on-Murray (W)	−798 miles (−1,280 km)	177 miles (280 km)		
Lock 3 (Overland Corner)	−802 miles (−1,290 km)	173 miles (280 km)		431 km
Ball Island	−802 miles (−1,290 km)	173 miles (280 km)		
Overland Corner (N)	−805 miles (−1,300 km)	170 miles (270 km)	311 miles (500 km)	
Parkoola Station (N)	−807 miles (−1,300 km)	168 miles (270 km)		
Wigley's Flat (S)	−810 miles (−1,300 km)	165 miles (270 km)	309 miles (500 km)	
Devlin's Pound (N)	−815 miles (−1,310 km)	160 miles (260 km)		
Poogenook			283 miles (460 km)	
Hart's Island	−824 miles (−1,330 km)	151 miles (240 km)	274 miles (440 km)	
Holder (S)				
Waikerle (S)	−831 miles (−1,340 km)	144 miles (230 km)		
Enalco			265 miles (430 km)	
Ramco (S)	−835 miles (−1,340 km)	140 miles (230 km)		
Lock 2 (Waikerie)				362 km
Murray View (W)	−839 miles (−1,350 km)	136 miles (220 km)		
Boggy Flat (N)	−843 miles (−1,360 km)	132 miles (210 km)		
Mullyris			245 miles (390 km)	
Markaranka Station (E)	−853 miles (−1,370 km)	122 miles (200 km)		
Weston Flat (N)	−858 miles (−1,380 km)	117 miles (190 km)		
Dutton's	−859 miles (−1,380 km)	116 miles (190 km)		
North-West Bend (N)	−866 miles (−1,390 km)	109 miles (180 km)	229 miles (370 km)	
Cadell (S)				
New Era (S)	−867 miles (−1,400 km)	108 miles (170 km)		
Bryant Creek	−867 miles (−1,400 km)	108 miles (170 km)		
Morgan (W)	−870 miles (−1,400 km)	105 miles (170 km)		
Brenda Station (W)	−877 miles (−1,410 km)	98 miles (160 km)		
Murbko Station (E)	−883 miles (−1,420 km)	92 miles (150 km)	209 miles (340 km)	
Wood's Flat	−885 miles (−1,420 km)	90 miles (140 km)		
Glenforstan Station (E)	−895 miles (−1,440 km)	80 miles (130 km)		
Lock 1 (Blanchetown)	−899 miles (−1,450 km)	76 miles (120 km)		274 km
Blanchetown (E)	−899 miles (−1,450 km)	76 miles (120 km)	196 miles (320 km)	
Portee (W)	−905 miles (−1,460 km)	70 miles (110 km)		
Moorundee			189 miles (300 km)	
Swan Reach (E)	−916 miles (−1,470 km)	59 miles (95 km)		
Punyelroo / Punyeroo	−920 miles (−1,480 km)	55 miles (89 km)		
Big Bend	−923 miles (−1,490 km)	52 miles (84 km)		
Luscombe's			169 miles (270 km)	
Nildottie (E)	−932 miles (−1,500 km)	43 miles (69 km)		
Forster	−936 miles (−1,510 km)	39 miles (63 km)		
Walker Flat	−941 miles (−1,510 km)	34 miles (55 km)		
Purnong	−950 miles (−1,530 km)	25 miles (40 km)		
Bowhill	−953 miles (−1,530 km)	22 miles (35 km)		
Smith's			131 miles (210 km)	
Teal Flat	−960 miles (−1,540 km)	15 miles (24 km)		
Taylor's			109 miles (180 km)	
Schuetz's Landing / Schuetze's Landing (E/S)	−965 miles (−1,550 km)	10 miles (16 km)		
Mannum (W)	−975 miles (−1,570 km)	0	95 miles (150 km)	
Cowirra (E)	−976 miles (−1,570 km)	−1 mile (−1.6 km)		
Dumas			93 miles (150 km)	
Caloote (W)	−980 miles (−1,580 km)	−5 miles (−8.0 km)		
Wall			88 miles (140 km)	
Pompoota (E)	−986 miles (−1,590 km)	−11 miles (−18 km)		
Mypolonga (W)	−990 miles (−1,590 km)	−15 miles (−24 km)		
Murray Bridge (W)	−999 miles (−1,610 km)	−24 miles (−39 km)	65 miles (100 km)	
Swanport (W)	−1,002 miles (−1,610 km)	−27 miles (−43 km)		
Thompson's Rocks			63 miles (100 km)	
Mason's Rock			56 miles (90 km)	
Tailem Bend (E)	−1,014 miles (−1,630 km)	−39 miles (−63 km)		
Cooke's			43 miles (70 km)	
Wellington (W)	−1,021 miles (−1,640 km)	−46 miles (−74 km)	41 miles (70 km)	
End of Lake Alexandrina (S)	−1,024 miles (−1,650 km)	−49 miles (−80 km)		
Point Pomond			35 miles (60 km)	
Milang			21 miles (30 km)	
Point McLeay / Raukkan	−1,042 miles (−1,680 km)	−67 miles (−110 km)		
Point Sturt			14 miles (20 km)	
Entrance to Lake Alexandrina	−1,050 miles (−1,690 km)	−75 miles (−120 km)		
Rankine's Farm; Rankine's Ferry			7 miles (10 km)	
Goolwa	−1,062 miles (−1,710 km)	−87 miles (−140 km)	0	
Murray Mouth	−1,069 miles (−1,720 km)	−94 miles (−150 km)		0

== See also ==
- List of Darling River distances
- List of Murray River crossings
- List of Murrumbidgee River distances
- Murray-Darling basin includes useful chart of tributaries
