= Uardry =

Pastoral lease in New South Wales, Australia

Coordinates: 34.4174°S 145.3033°E

Location in New South Wales

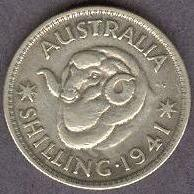
1941 Australian shilling coin. The champion ram depicted was Uardry 0.1 bred at Uardry Stud

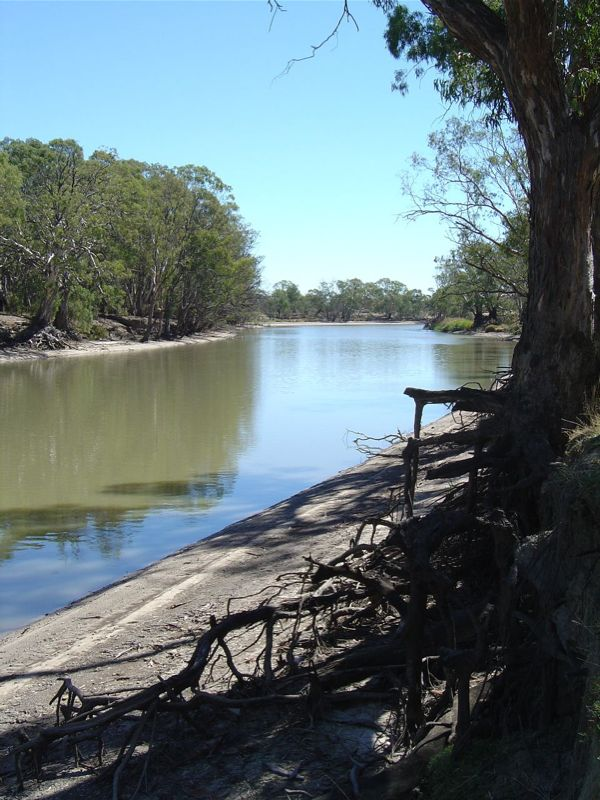
Murrumbidgee River near Hay

Uardry Station, most commonly known as Uardry, is a pastoral lease that has operated as both a sheep station and a cattle station in outback New South Wales.

It is situated about 40 kilometres (25 mi) east of Hay and south west of Griffith and has 32 kilometres (20 mi) frontage to the Murrumbidgee River. The country is composed of flat plains predominantly covered in saltbush.

Uardry was initially established in 1840 by John Rochfort Rae, with his partner Henry Angel arriving in 1844. The property was originally known as Wardry. Like most inland properties of the time it operated as a cattle station and Angel remained at the property until the 1860s.

In 1864 the property was acquired by Thomas and William Wragge along with John and James Hearne for £1,000; they converted Uardry into a sheep station. The partnership remained at the property for 11 years. The name was also changed from Wardry to Uardry on the advice from a surveyor that Wardry was the name of another station further north. Uardry is an Aboriginal word meaning yellow box tree.

In 1875, the property was acquired by Charles Mills, Andrew Neilson and William Smith. At the time the property had an area of 70,000 acres (28,328 ha). Shortly afterwards Mills was fortunate enough to acquire a small flock of pure Peppin Merinos, which he carefully bred to avoid outside blood to produce an excellent merino flock with "a bold combing wool of medium to strong quality". By the 1880s Mills was exhibiting at the Hay agricultural show, in which they won 104 champions and 60 second prizes. As his partners died Mills acquired their shares of the enterprise and eventually was the sole owner of Uardry. By 1900 Mills passed on the running of the property to his oldest son, Ainslie, and later his third son, Nelson, took control. In 1937 the property was regarded as one of the most highly improved and best irrigated, with 38 ground tanks, 11 wells and 17 sub-artesian bores equipped with windmills and troughs to supply water to stock.

The Black family held the property from 1973 to 2012, building the property into one of the most prestigious merino studs in Australia., expanding from one stud in 1973 to four in 2010. By the time it was sold Uardry had an annual turnover of A$5 million with 350 active clients. The property was stocked with 25,000 sheep and 1,000 cattle.

In 2012 Uardry was acquired by Tom Brinkworth, who paid A$30 million for the 35,000 hectares (86,487 acres) for the property. Brinkworth intended to use the water rights that Uardry held on the Murrumbidgee to use the property for cropping, to grow corn and silage, and to drought proof the rest of his livestock holdings. The merino flock including all of the stud merino was to be sold from the property.

In 2013 Brinkworth purchased 18,000 head of cattle for A$ million from drought affected properties on the Barkly Tableland owned by the Australian Agricultural Company. Brinkworth then had the cattle moved by droving them a distance of 1,500 kilometres (932 mi) to Uardry using old stock routes. Many were agisted at Uradry with the remainder of the herd being dispersed through Brinkworth properties in New South Wales and Victoria.

== See also ==
- List of ranches and stations
