= List of Darling River distances =

List of distances between landmarks in New South Wales

This is a table of river distances of various locations along the Murray, Darling and Namoi Rivers upstream from Hay, New South Wales.

Note that river distances are by their nature imprecise, will always be greater than straight line distances, and frequently greater than road distances. Note the discrepancy between two independent lists, highlighting the variability of conditions on the meandering river from season to season. The course chosen by the captain depends critically on the vessel's draught, the river's depth, and navigability of anabranches.

Place	Side of river	River distance from Wentworth	River distance from Mannum	River distance from Wentworth
Murray junction		−0.5 miles (−0.80 km)	415 miles (670 km)	
Wentworth		0	415 miles (670 km)	0
Tapio	East	30 miles (48 km)	445 miles (720 km)	40 miles (60 km)
Avoca stn.				42 miles (70 km)
Para		68 miles (109 km)	483 miles (780 km)	93 miles (150 km)
Burtundy	South			109 miles (180 km)
Middle Yards				118 miles (190 km)
Mallara / Malara	East	137 miles (220 km)	552 miles (890 km)	188 miles (300 km)
Tarcoola		138 miles (220 km)	553 miles (890 km)	191 miles (310 km)
Pooncarie	East	144 miles (230 km)	559 miles (900 km)	200 miles (320 km)
Polia	West	174 miles (280 km)	589 miles (950 km)	240 miles (390 km)
Moorara	East	187 miles (300 km)	602 miles (970 km)	257 miles (410 km)
Cuthero & anabranch entrance	West	225 miles (360 km)	640 miles (1,030 km)	309 miles (500 km)
Tolarno	East	260 miles (420 km)	675 miles (1,090 km)	360 miles (580 km)
Netley	West	266 miles (430 km)	681 miles (1,100 km)	365 miles (590 km)
Potingie / Bothinga		294 miles (470 km)	709 miles (1,140 km)	411 miles (660 km)
Kinchega	West	305 miles (490 km)	720 miles (1,160 km)	419 miles (670 km)
Menindee		320 miles (510 km)	735 miles (1,180 km)	439 miles (710 km)
Pamamaroo / Pamamara	North	342 miles (550 km)	757 miles (1,220 km)	469 miles (750 km)
Albermarle				481 miles (770 km)
Weinteriga		400 miles (640 km)	815 miles (1,310 km)	547 miles (880 km)
Tintinallogy				564 miles (910 km)
Bililla / Billilla				624 miles (1,000 km)
Culpaulla / Culpaulin				644 miles (1,040 km)
Wilcannia		513 miles (830 km)	928 miles (1,490 km)	694 miles (1,120 km)
Mount Murchison HS	North	522 miles (840 km)		703 miles (1,130 km)
Murtee				721 miles (1,160 km)
Cultowa	South			826 miles (1,330 km)
Nelyambo				865 miles (1,390 km)
Walloo				868 miles (1,400 km)
Marra				894 miles (1,440 km)
Tankarooka				899 miles (1,450 km)
Buckambie / Buckanbee				918 miles (1,480 km)
Tilpa / Tilpah, Killara / Kallarra	North			944 miles (1,520 km)
Murray’s				979 miles (1,580 km)
Combadore				984 miles (1,580 km)
Winbar	South			1,032 miles (1,660 km)
Dunlop	North			1,044 miles (1,680 km)
Louth	East			1,064 miles (1,710 km)
Warrego Junction				1,109 miles (1,780 km)
Toorale	South			1,113 miles (1,790 km)
Gundabooka				1,130 miles (1,820 km)
Fort Bourke				1,163 miles (1,870 km)
Yanda	South			1,166 miles (1,880 km)
Nulta				1,185 miles (1,910 km)
Jandra	South			1,204 miles (1,940 km)
O’Shanassy				1,216 miles (1,960 km)
Bourke	South	883 miles (1,420 km)	1,298 miles (2,090 km)	1,227 miles (1,970 km)
Warraweena	North			1,242 miles (2,000 km)
Culgoa River junction	North			1,277 miles (2,060 km)
Bogan River junction	South			1,251 miles (2,010 km)
Bemery / Beemery	South			1,307 miles (2,100 km)
Bunnawannah				1,309 miles (2,110 km)
Brewarrina				1,377 miles (2,220 km)
Walgett		1,183 miles (1,900 km)	1,598 miles (2,570 km)	1,547 miles (2,490 km)
Namoi—Barwon junction				

== See also ==
- List of Murray River crossings
- List of Murray River distances
- List of Murrumbidgee River distances
- Murray–Darling basin includes useful chart of tributaries
