= Arthur Harris =

Marshal of the Royal Air Force (1892–1984)

Sir Arthur Harris Bt GCB OBE AFC
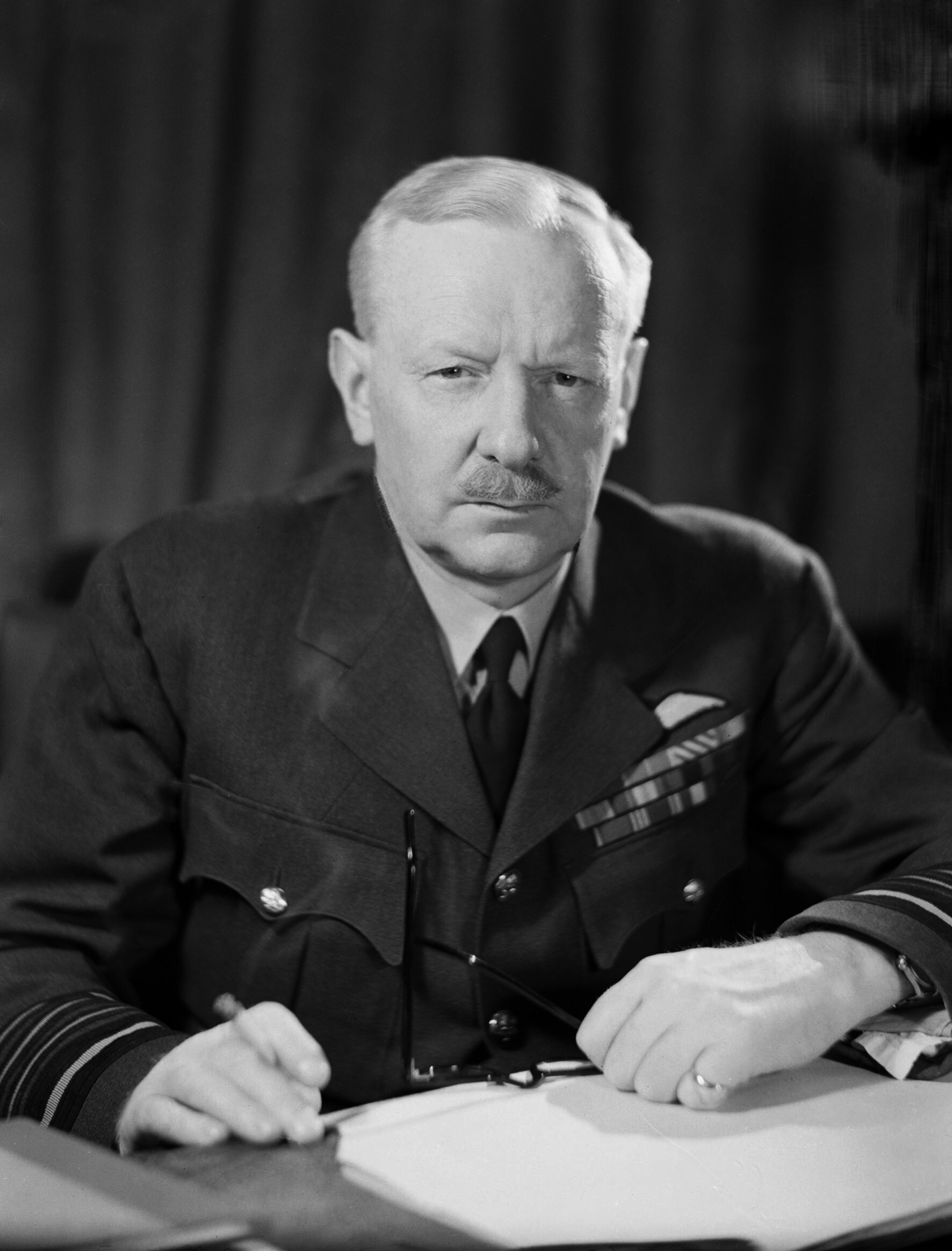
- Air Chief Marshal Sir Arthur Travers Harris, 24 April 1944
- Born: Arthur Travers Harris; 13 April 1892; Cheltenham, Gloucestershire, England
- Died: 5 April 1984 (aged 91); Goring-on-Thames, Oxfordshire, England
- Military career
- Allegiance: United Kingdom
- Branch: British Army; Rhodesia Regiment
- Service years: 1914–1946
- Rank: Marshal of the Royal Air Force
- Nickname: Bomber Harris
- Unit: Royal Air Force
- Commands: Bomber Command (1942–45); No. 5 Group (1939–40); RAF Palestine and Transjordan (1938–39); No. 4 Group (1937–38); RAF Pembroke Dock (1933); No. 210 Squadron (1933); No. 58 Squadron (1925–27); No. 45 Squadron (1922–24); No. 31 Squadron (1921–22); No. 50 Squadron (1918–19); No. 44 Squadron (1918); No. 191 Squadron (1918)
- Conflicts: First World War; Arab revolt in Palestine; Second World War
- Awards: Knight Grand Cross of the Order of the Bath; Officer of the Order of the British Empire; Air Force Cross; Mentioned in Despatches (2); Order of Suvorov, 1st Class (USSR); Distinguished Service Medal (United States); Chief Commander of the Legion of Merit (United States); Grand Cross of the Order of Polonia Restituta (Poland); Grand Cross of the Order of the Southern Cross (Brazil); Grand Officer of the Legion of Honour (France); Croix de guerre (France)
- Other work: Manager of the South African Marine Corporation

Marshal of the Royal Air Force Sir Arthur Travers Harris, 1st Baronet, GCB, OBE, AFC (13 April 1892 – 5 April 1984), commonly known as "Bomber" Harris by the press and often within the RAF as "Butcher" or "Butch" Harris, was a British-Rhodesian Air Officer Commanding-in-Chief (AOC-in-C) RAF Bomber Command during the height of the Anglo-American strategic bombing campaign against Nazi Germany in the Second World War. (Note: The RAF aircrew's nickname for Harris, "Butcher" or "Butch", was not bestowed as a comment on the morality of his bombing policy. It referred to his seeming indifference to the losses his aircrew were suffering. The losses were staggering: a crew member on a British bomber had a shorter life expectancy than an infantryman in the trenches of the First World War.)

Born in Gloucestershire, Harris emigrated to Rhodesia in 1910, aged 17. He joined the 1st Rhodesia Regiment at the outbreak of the First World War and saw action in South Africa and South West Africa. In 1915, Harris returned to England to fight in the European theatre of the war. He joined the Royal Flying Corps, with which he remained until the formation of the Royal Air Force in 1918. Harris remained in the Air Force through the 1920s and 1930s, serving in India, Mesopotamia, Persia, Egypt, Palestine, and elsewhere.

At the outbreak of the Second World War in 1939, Harris took command of No. 5 Group RAF in England, and in February 1942 was appointed head of Bomber Command. He retained that position for the rest of the war. In the same year, the British Cabinet agreed to the "area bombing" of German cities. Harris was given the task of implementing Churchill's policy and supported the development of tactics and technology to perform the task more effectively. Harris assisted British Chief of the Air Staff Marshal of the Royal Air Force Charles Portal in carrying out the United Kingdom's most devastating attacks against the German infrastructure and population, including the bombing of Dresden. Harris's orders from the war cabinet to focus on area bombing rather than precision targeting remained controversial owing to the large number of civilian casualties, destruction of civilian infrastructure and cultural landmarks the strategy caused in continental Europe.

After the war Harris moved to South Africa, where he managed the South African Marine Corporation. He was created a baronet in 1953. He died in England in 1984.

== Early life ==
Harris was born on 13 April 1892, at Cheltenham, Gloucestershire, where his parents were staying while his father George Steel Travers Harris, a government engineer in India, was on home leave. With his father in India most of the time, Harris grew up without a sense of solid roots and belonging; he spent much of his later childhood with the family of a Kent rector, the Reverend C E Graham-Jones, whom he later recalled fondly. Harris was educated at Allhallows School in Devon, while his two elder brothers were educated at the more prestigious Sherborne and Eton, respectively; according to biographer Henry Probert, this was because Sherborne and Eton were expensive and "there was not much money left for number three".

A former Allhallows student, the actor Arthur Chudleigh, often visited the school and gave the boys free tickets to his shows. Harris received such a ticket in 1909, and went to see the play during his summer holidays. The lead character in the show was a Rhodesian farmer who returned to England to marry, but ultimately fell out with his pompous fiancée and married the more practical housemaid instead. The idea of a country where one was judged on ability rather than class was very inspiring to the adventurous Harris, who promptly told his father (who had just retired and returned to England) that he intended to emigrate to Southern Rhodesia instead of going back to Allhallows for the new term. Harris's father was disappointed, having had in mind a military or civil service career for his son, but reluctantly agreed.

In early 1910, Harris senior paid his son's passage on the SS Inanda to Beira in Mozambique, from where he travelled by rail to Umtali in Manicaland. Harris earned his living over the next few years mining, coach-driving and farming. He received a more permanent position in November 1913, when he was taken on by Crofton Townsend, a man from near Cork in Ireland who had moved to Rhodesia and founded Lowdale Farm near Mazoe in Mashonaland in 1903. Harris quickly gained his employer's trust, and was made farm manager at Lowdale when Townsend went to visit England for a year in early 1914. Having acquired the skills necessary to ranch successfully in Rhodesia, Harris decided that he would start his own farm in the country as soon as Townsend returned. According to Probert, Harris by now regarded himself "primarily as a Rhodesian", a self-identification he retained for the rest of his life.

== Military career ==
=== First World War ===
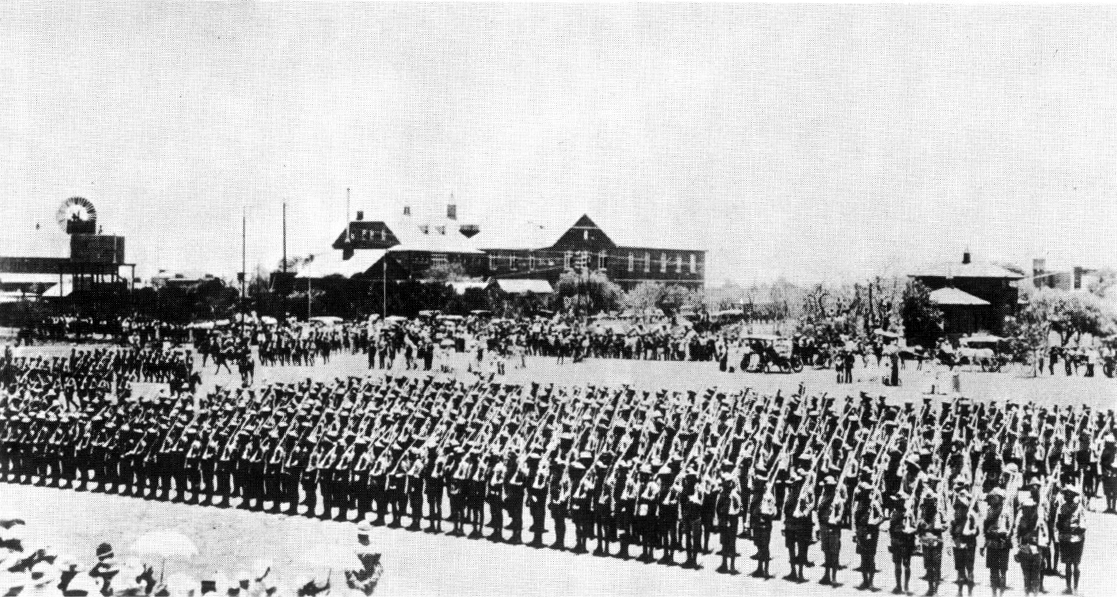
The 1st Rhodesia Regiment parades in Bulawayo on its way to South Africa in November 1914. Harris was with the unit as a bugler.

When the First World War broke out in August 1914, Harris did not learn of it for nearly a month, being out in the bush at the time. Despite his previous reluctance to follow the path his father had had in mind for him in the army, and his desire to set up his own ranch in Rhodesia, Harris felt patriotically compelled to join the war effort. He quickly attempted to join the 1st Rhodesia Regiment, which had been raised by the British South Africa Company administration to help put down the Maritz Rebellion in South Africa, but he found that only two positions were available: as a machine-gunner or as a bugler. Having learnt to bugle at Allhallows, he successfully applied to be a bugler and was sworn in on 20 October 1914.

The 1st Rhodesia Regiment briefly garrisoned Bloemfontein, then served alongside the South African forces in South-West Africa during the first half of 1915. The campaign made a strong impression on Harris, particularly the long desert marches; three decades later, he wrote that "to this day I never walk a step if I can get any sort of vehicle to carry me". South-West Africa also provided Harris with his first experience of aerial bombing: the sole German aircraft in South-West Africa attempted to drop artillery shells on his unit, but failed to do any damage.

When the South-West African Campaign ended in July 1915, the 1st Rhodesia Regiment was withdrawn to Cape Town, where it was disbanded; Harris was formally discharged on 31 July. He felt initially that he had done his part for the Empire, and went back to Rhodesia to resume work at Lowdale, but he and many of his former comrades soon reconsidered when it became clear that the war in Europe was going to last much longer than they had expected. They were reluctant to join the 2nd Rhodesia Regiment, which was being raised to serve in East Africa, perceiving the "bush whacking" of the war's African theatre as less important than the "real war" in Europe. Harris sailed for England from Beira at the Company administration's expense in August, a member of a 300-man party of white Southern Rhodesian war volunteers. He arrived in October 1915, moved in with his parents in London and, after unsuccessfully attempting to find a position in first the cavalry, then the Royal Artillery, joined the Royal Flying Corps as a second lieutenant on probation on 6 November 1915.

Harris learned to fly at Brooklands in late 1915 and, having been confirmed in his rank, then went on to serve with distinction on the home front and in France during 1917 as a flight commander and ultimately CO of No. 45 Squadron, flying the Sopwith 1½ Strutter and Sopwith Camel. Before he returned to Britain to command No. 44 Squadron on Home Defence duties, Harris claimed five enemy aircraft destroyed and was awarded the Air Force Cross (AFC) on 2 November 1918. Intending to return to Rhodesia one day, Harris wore a "rhodesia" shoulder flash on his uniform. He finished the war a major.

=== Inter-war years ===
Harris remained in the newly formed Royal Air Force (RAF) following the end of the First World War, choosing an air force career over a return to Rhodesia because he and his first wife Barbara had just had their first child, and he did not think Barbara would enjoy being a Rhodesian farmer's wife. In April 1920 Squadron Leader Harris was jointly appointed station commander of RAF Digby and commander of No. 3 Flying Training School RAF. He later served in different capacities in India, Mesopotamia and Persia. He said of his service in India that he first became involved in bombing during the usual annual North West Frontier tribesmen trouble. His squadron was equipped with poorly maintained Bristol F.2 Fighter aircraft. In Mesopotamia (Iraq) he commanded a Vickers Vernon transport squadron. Harris later wrote of his time there that "We cut a hole in the nose and rigged up our own bomb racks and I turned those machines into the heaviest and best bombers in the command." The squadron, No.45, carried out raids, including night raids, against both Turkish invading forces and local Arab rebel groups. Harris once remarked that "the only thing the Arab understands is the heavy hand." He also said of the bombing raids in Iraq that "within 45 minutes a full sized village can be practically wiped out and a third of its inhabitants killed or injured... no effective means of escape."

During the 1920s Harris occasionally doubted his decision to remain with the RAF rather than going back to Rhodesia; he submitted his resignation in May 1922, but was persuaded to stay. After his return from Iraq to the UK in October 1924, and a staff training course, he was posted to command the first postwar heavy bomber squadron (No. 58, equipped with the Vickers Virginia), in May 1925. His commander in Iraq had been the future Chief of the Air Staff Sir John Salmond, who was also one of his commanders back in Britain. Together they developed "night training for night operations". He was appointed an Officer of the Order of the British Empire on 3 June 1927 and promoted to wing commander on 1 July 1927.

From 1927 to 1929, Harris attended the Army Staff College at Camberley, where he discovered that at the college the Army kept 200 horses for the officers' fox hunting. At a time when all services were very short of equipment, the Army high command—which was still dominated by cavalry officers—clearly had a different set of priorities from technocrats like Harris, who quipped that the army commanders would only be happy with the tank if someone developed one that "ate hay and thereafter made noises like a horse". He also had a low opinion of the Navy; he commented that there were three things which should never be allowed on a well-run yacht, "a wheelbarrow, an umbrella and a naval officer". Bernard Montgomery was one of the few army officers he met while at the college whom he liked, possibly because they shared certain underlying personality characteristics.

His next command was of a flying-boat squadron, where he continued to develop night flying techniques. He was promoted to group captain on 30 June 1933. From 1934 to 1937 he was the Deputy Director of Plans in the Air Ministry. He was posted to the Middle East Command in Egypt, as a senior Air Staff Officer. In 1936 Harris commented on the Palestinian Arab revolt that "one 250 lb. or 500 lb. bomb in each village that speaks out of turn" would satisfactorily solve the problem. The same year he visited Southern Rhodesia in a professional capacity to help the Southern Rhodesian government set up its own air force.

On 2 July 1937 Harris was promoted to air commodore and in 1938 he was put in command of No. 4 (Bomber) Group. After a purchasing mission to the United States he was posted to Palestine and Trans-Jordan, where he became Officer Commanding the RAF contingent in that area with promotion to air vice-marshal on 1 July 1939.

In this period Harris, and others, pressured senior staff for large strategic bombers, which could bomb German targets from England. This resulted in specifications from the Air Staff which led to the Avro Manchester, Handley Page Halifax and Short Stirling. Later, after severe shortcomings were displayed on operations, the Manchester was redesigned to become the very effective Avro Lancaster.

=== Second World War ===
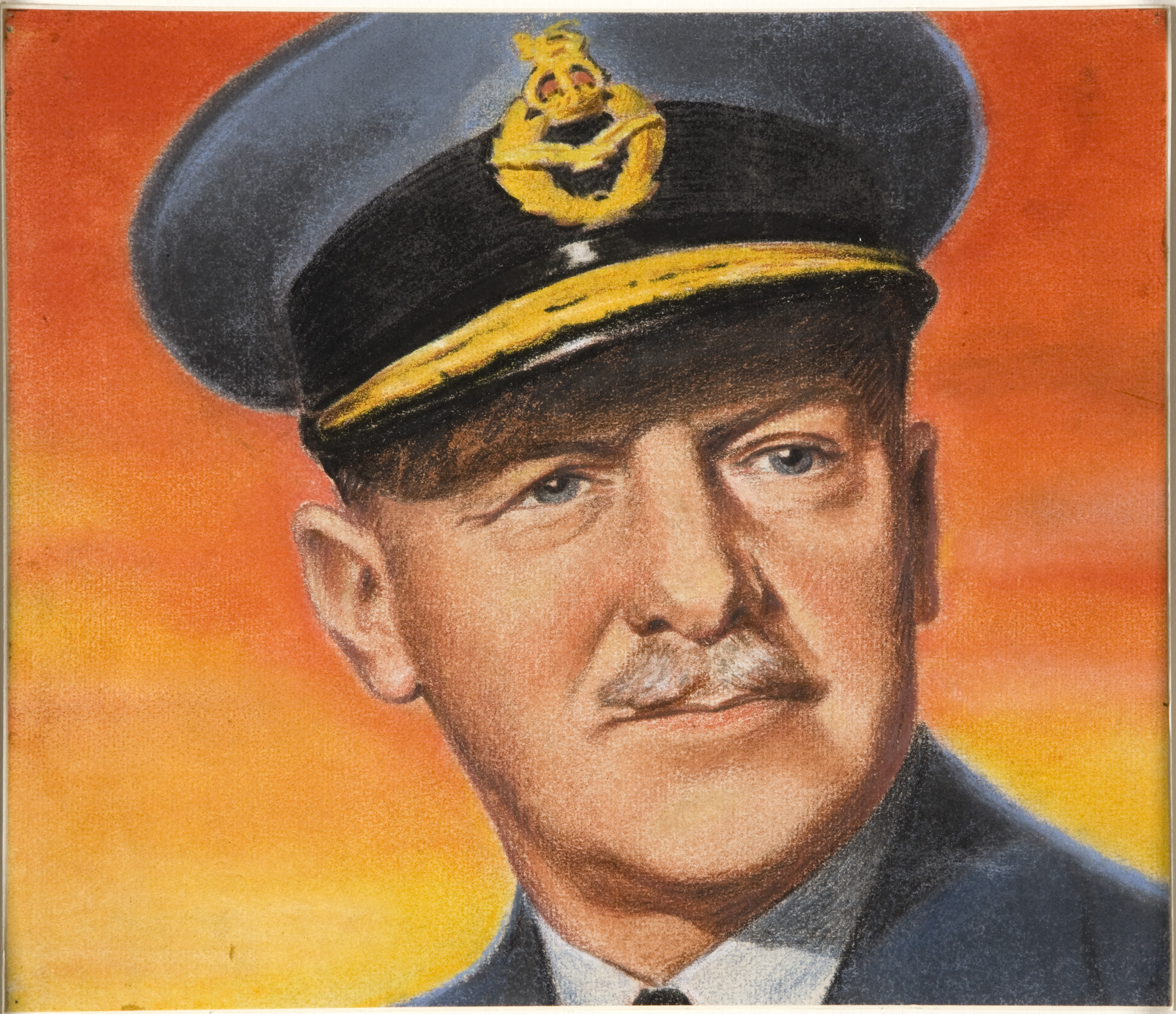
Harris, c. 1943 by William Timym

Harris returned to Britain in September 1939 to take command of No. 5 Group. Appointed a Companion of the Order of the Bath on 11 July 1940 he was made Deputy Chief of the Air Staff in November 1940 and promoted to the acting rank of air marshal on 1 June 1941.

The Butt Report, circulated in August 1941, found that in 1940 and 1941 only one in three attacking aircraft got within five miles (eight kilometres) of their target.

Harris was appointed Commander-in-Chief of Bomber Command in February 1942, replacing Air Marshal Sir Richard Pierse, who became in charge of Air Forces in Southeast Asia.

Harris was advanced to Knight Commander of the Order of the Bath on 11 June 1942.

In 1942, Professor Frederick Lindemann, having been appointed the British government's leading scientific adviser by his friend, Prime Minister Winston Churchill, presented a seminal paper to Cabinet advocating the area bombing of German cities in a strategic bombing campaign. It was accepted by Cabinet and Harris was directed to carry out the Area bombing directive. It became an important part of the total war waged against Germany. At first the effects were limited because of the small numbers of aircraft used and the lack of navigational aids, resulting in scattered, inaccurate bombing. As production of better aircraft and electronic aids increased, Harris pressed for raids on a much larger scale, each to use 1,000 aeroplanes. In Operation Millennium Harris launched the first RAF "thousand bomber raid" against Cologne (Köln) on the night of 30/31 May 1942. This operation included the first use of a bomber stream, which was a tactical innovation designed to overwhelm the German night-fighters of the Kammhuber Line. Harris was promoted to temporary air marshal on 1 December 1942 and acting air chief marshal on 18 March 1943.

Harris was just one of an influential group of high-ranking Allied air commanders who continued to believe that massive and sustained area bombing alone would force Germany to surrender. On a number of occasions he wrote to his superiors claiming the war would be over in a matter of months, first in August 1943 following the tremendous success of the Battle of Hamburg (codenamed Operation Gomorrah), when he assured the Chief of the Air Staff, Sir Charles Portal, that his force would be able "to produce in Germany by April 1st 1944 a state of devastation in which surrender is inevitable" and then again in January 1944. Winston Churchill continued to regard the area bombing strategy with distaste and official public statements maintained that Bomber Command was attacking only specific industrial and economic targets, with any civilian casualties or property damage being unintentional but unavoidable. In October 1943, emboldened by his success in Hamburg and increasingly irritated with Churchill's hesitance to endorse his tactics wholeheartedly, Harris urged the government to be honest with the public regarding the purpose of the bombing campaign,

The aim of the Combined Bomber Offensive ... should be unambiguously stated [as] the destruction of German cities, the killing of German workers, and the disruption of civilised life throughout Germany ... the destruction of houses, public utilities, transport and lives, the creation of a refugee problem on an unprecedented scale, and the breakdown of morale both at home and at the battle fronts by fear of extended and intensified bombing, are accepted and intended aims of our bombing policy. They are not by-products of attempts to hit factories.

Many senior Allied air commanders still thought area bombing was less effective. In November 1943 Bomber Command began what became known as the Battle of Berlin that lasted until March 1944. Harris sought to duplicate the victory at Hamburg but Berlin proved to be a far more difficult target. Although severe general damage was inflicted, the city was much better prepared than Hamburg and no firestorms were ignited. Anti-aircraft defences were also extremely effective and bomber losses were high; the British lost 1,047 bombers, with a further 1,682 damaged, culminating in the disastrous raid on Nuremberg on 30 March 1944, when 94 bombers were shot down and 71 damaged, out of 795 aircraft.

Harris was promoted to the substantive rank of air marshal on 1 January 1944 and awarded the Russian Order of Suvorov, First Class on 29 February 1944. After the Southern Rhodesian Prime Minister, Sir Godfrey Huggins, visited Harris in May 1944, Southern Rhodesia asked the UK government to appoint Harris as Governor at the end of the year, Huggins being keen to install a self-identifying Rhodesian in that office rather than a high-ranking British figure. Though keen to take the position, Harris felt he could not leave the war at this key stage, an opinion shared by Churchill, who turned down the Southern Rhodesian request.

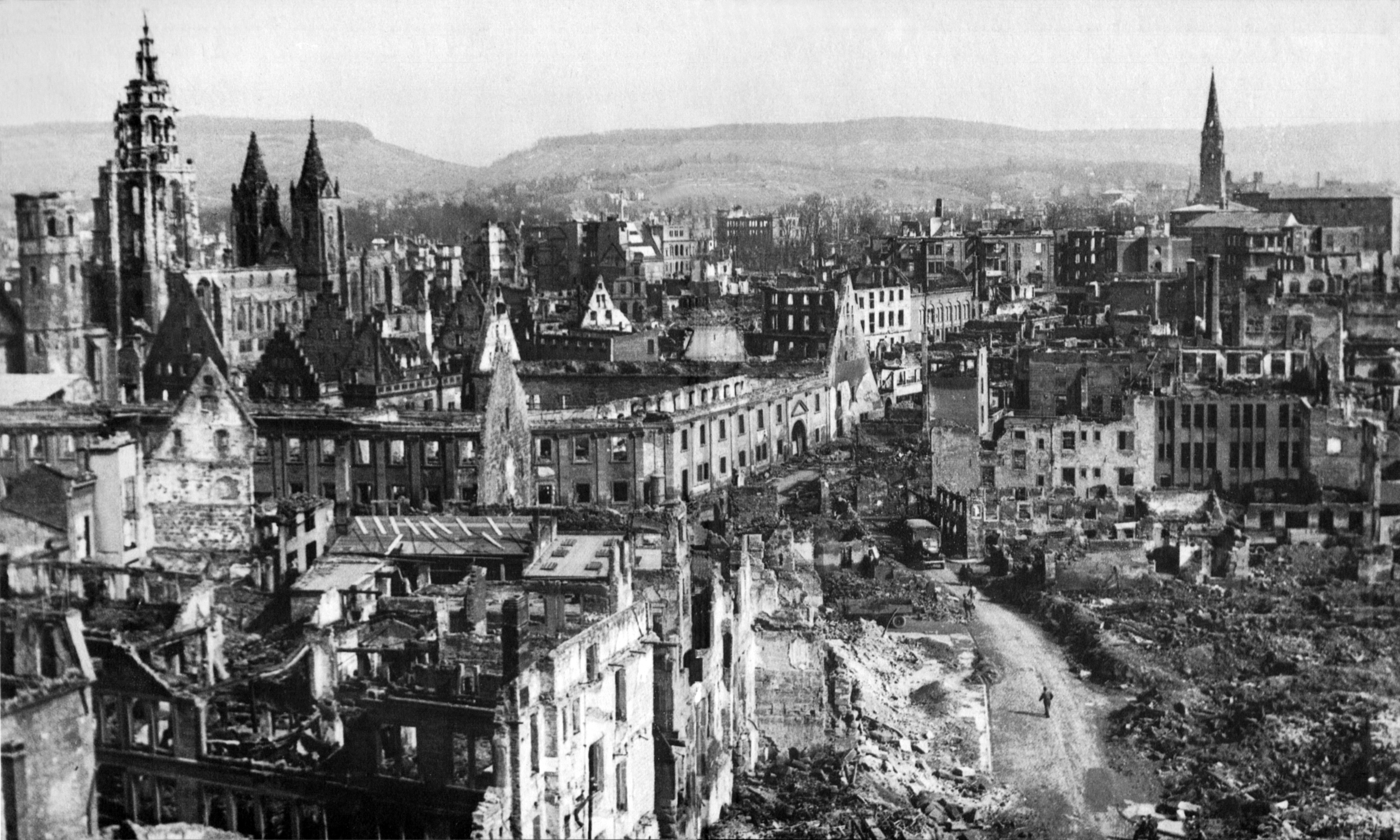
Heilbronn in 1945

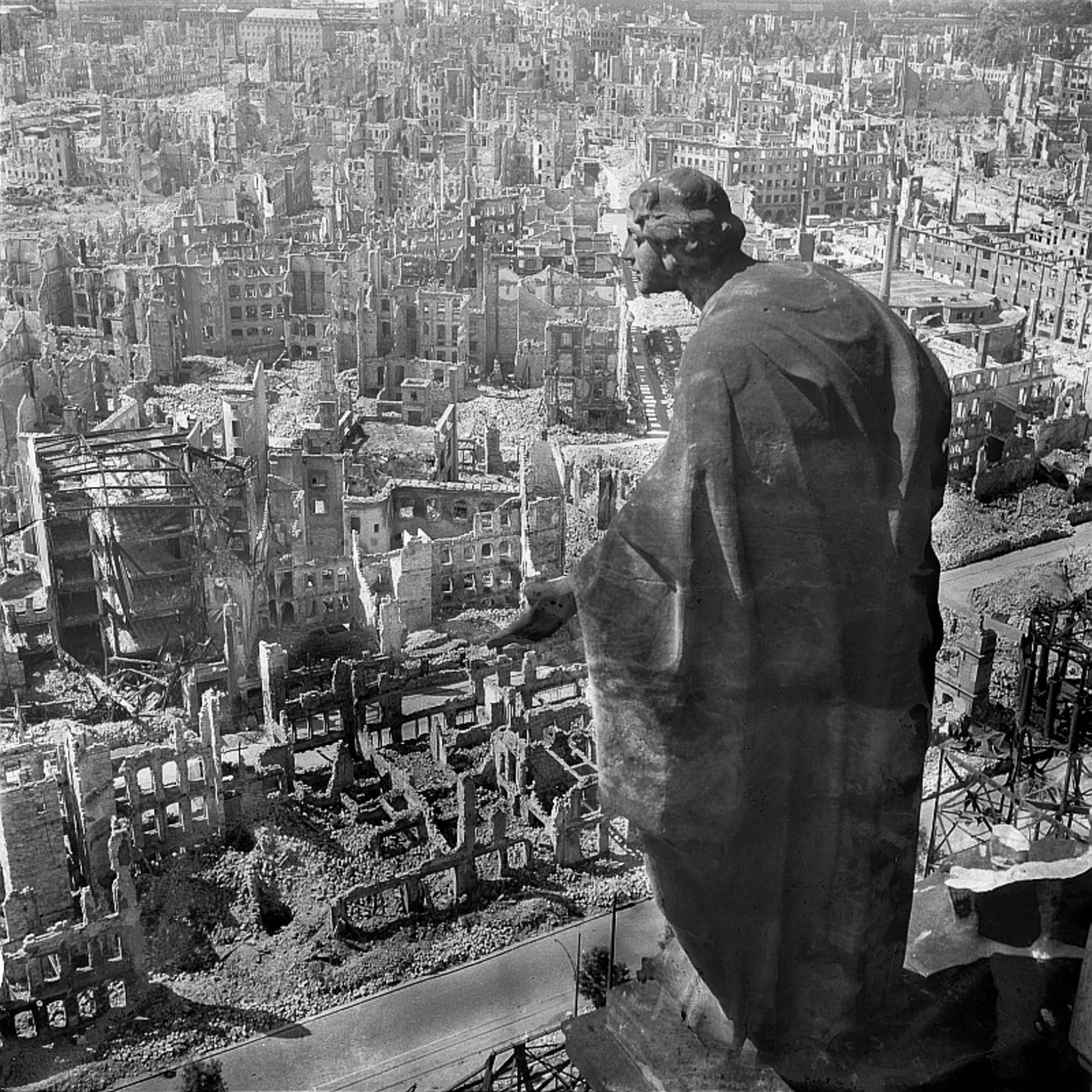
Dresden in 1945

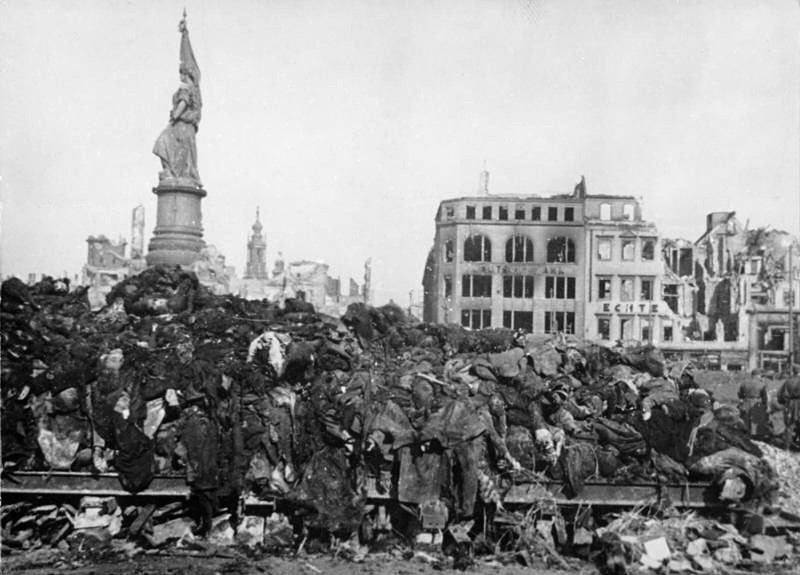
A pile of bodies in Dresden awaiting cremation, February 1945

Before the D-Day invasion on 6 June 1944, Harris was ordered to switch targets for the French railway network under the Transport Plan; this was a switch he protested against because he felt it compromised the pressure being applied to German industry and using Bomber Command for a purpose it was not designed or suited for. By September the Allied forces were well inland; at the Quebec Conference it was agreed that the Chief of the Air Staff, Royal Air Force (Portal), and the Commanding General, U.S. Army Air Forces (Arnold), should exercise control of all strategic bomber forces in Europe. Harris received a new directive to ensure continuation of a broad strategic bombing programme as well as adequate bomber support for General Eisenhower's ground operations. The mission of the strategic air forces remained "the progressive destruction and dislocation of the German military, industrial and economic systems and the direct support of Land and Naval forces".

After D-Day, with the resumption of the strategic bomber campaign over Germany, Harris remained wedded to area bombardment. The historian Frederick Taylor argues that, because Harris lacked the necessary security clearance to know about Ultra, he had been given some information gleaned from Enigma but not informed of the source. According to Taylor, this directly affected Harris's attitude concerning the effectiveness of the post-D-Day 1944 directives (orders) to target oil installations, as Harris did not know the Allied High Command was using high-level German sources to assess exactly how much Allied operations were impairing the German war effort. Harris tended to see the directives to bomb specific oil and munitions targets as a high level command "panacea" (his word) and a distraction from the real task of making the rubble bounce in every large German city. Harris was promoted to the substantive rank of air chief marshal on 16 August 1944.

The historian Bernard Wasserstein notes that the official history of British strategic bombing says, in what Wasserstein describes as 'an unusually sharp personal observation', that "Harris made a habit of seeing only one side of a question and then of exaggerating it. He had a tendency to confuse advice with interference, criticism with sabotage and evidence with propaganda". Alfred C. Mierzejewski argues that area bombing and attacks against fuel plants were ineffective against Germany's coal- and rail-based economy and that the bombing campaign only took a decisive turn in late 1944, when the allies switched to attacking railway-marshalling yards for the coal gateways of the Ruhr. His summation is rejected by Sebastian Cox, head of the Air Historical Branch (AHB). Cox notes that half of the oil was produced by Benzol plants located in the Ruhr. These areas were the primary target of Bomber Command in 1943 and the autumn of 1944. Cox concludes that the targets were highly vulnerable to area attacks and suffered accordingly. The American official history notes that Harris was ordered to cease attacks on oil in November 1944, as the combined bombing had been so effective that none of the synthetic plants were operating effectively. The American history also includes information from Albert Speer, in which he points out that Bomber Command's night attacks were the most effective. Harris was very encouraging of innovation but he resisted the creation of the Pathfinder Force and the development of precision strikes which had proven so effective in the Dambusters' raid.

Harris was awarded the American Legion of Merit on 30 January 1945. The most controversial raid of the war took place in the late evening of 13 February 1945. The bombing of Dresden by the RAF and USAAF resulting in a lethal firestorm which killed a large number of civilians. Estimates vary but the city authorities at the time estimated no more than 25,000 victims, a figure which subsequent investigations, including one commissioned by the city council in 2010, support. Raids such as that on Pforzheim late in the war as Germany was falling have been criticised for causing high civilian casualties for little apparent military value. The culmination of Bomber Command's offensive occurred in March 1945 when the RAF dropped the highest monthly weight of ordnance in the entire war. The last raid on Berlin took place on the night of 21/22 April, just before the Soviets entered the city centre. After that, most of the rest of the attacks made by the RAF were tactical missions. The last big strategic raid was the destruction of the oil refinery in Tønsberg in southern Norway by a large group of Lancasters on the night of 25/26 April.

In his postwar memoirs Harris wrote, "In spite of all that happened at Hamburg, bombing proved a relatively humane method". His wartime views were expressed in an internal secret memo to the Air Ministry after the Dresden raid in February 1945

I ... assume that the view under consideration is something like this: no doubt in the past we were justified in attacking German cities. But to do so was always repugnant and now that the Germans are beaten anyway we can properly abstain from proceeding with these attacks. This is a doctrine to which I could never subscribe. Attacks on cities like any other act of war are intolerable unless they are strategically justified. But they are strategically justified in so far as they tend to shorten the war and preserve the lives of Allied soldiers. To my mind we have absolutely no right to give them up unless it is certain that they will not have this effect. I do not personally regard the whole of the remaining cities of Germany as worth the bones of one British Grenadier. (Note: The phrase "worth the bones of one British grenadier" was a deliberate echo of a famous sentence used by German Chancellor Bismarck "The whole of the Balkans is not worth the bones of a single Pomeranian grenadier".)

Whenever the bombing campaign of World War II is considered it must be appreciated that the war was an "integrated process". As an example, quoting Albert Speer from his book Inside The Third Reich, "ten thousand [88mm] anti-aircraft guns ... could well have been employed in Russia against tanks and other ground targets". The Soviet commanders clearly recognized Harris's efforts, as shown by the 29 February 1944 award of the Russian Order of Suvorov First Class to the air marshal.

=== Post-war era ===
At the war's conclusion, Harris was given various decorations. He was awarded the Polish Order of Polonia Restituta First Class on 12 June 1945, advanced to Knight Grand Cross of the Order of the Bath on 14 June 1945 and appointed a Knight Grand Cross of the Order of the Southern Cross of Brazil on 13 November 1945. He was also awarded the Distinguished Service Medal by the United States on 14 June 1946 and promoted to Marshal of the Royal Air Force on 1 January 1946.

Within the postwar British government there was some disquiet about the level of destruction that had been created by the area-bombing of German cities towards the end of the war. Harris retired on 15 September 1946 and wrote his story of Bomber Command's achievements in Bomber Offensive. In this book he wrote, concerning Dresden, "I know that the destruction of so large and splendid a city at this late stage of the war was considered unnecessary even by a good many people who admit that our earlier attacks were as fully justified as any other operation of war. Here I will only say that the attack on Dresden was at the time considered a military necessity by much more important people than myself." Bomber Command's crews were denied a separate campaign medal - as they were already eligible for both the Air Crew Europe Star and France and Germany Star - and, in protest at this perceived establishment snub to his men, Harris refused a peerage in 1946; he was the sole commander-in-chief not to become a peer.

Disappointed to have missed the opportunity to return to Southern Rhodesia as governor because of the war, Harris wrote to Huggins in June 1945 that he would like to be considered if the office were ever open again, and that he would be interested in other Southern Rhodesian government appointments relating to aviation or perhaps entering politics there. "If I have deserved anything of my country—Rhodesia—it would delight me to have opportunity to serve her further," he wrote. Huggins replied that he was sympathetic, but that none of these ideas was practical: Harris would be too old by the time a new Governor was needed; it might take years for Harris to enter Southern Rhodesian politics as he would first need to meet residency requirements, then cultivate support in a constituency; and Huggins felt he could not make promises about aviation posts with a general election coming up the following year. Harris finally dropped his dream of a return to Rhodesia, deeming it unworkable, and in 1948 moved instead to South Africa, where he managed the South African Marine Corporation (Safmarine) from 1946 to 1953.

In February 1953 Winston Churchill, now prime minister again, insisted that Harris accept a baronetcy and he became baronet. In the same year he returned to the UK, and lived his remaining years in the Ferry House in Goring-on-Thames, located directly adjacent to the River Thames.

In 1974 Harris appeared in the acclaimed documentary series The World At War produced by Thames Television and shown on ITV. In the 12th episode entitled "Whirlwind: Bombing Germany (September 1939 – April 1944)", narrated by Laurence Olivier, Harris discusses at length the area-bombing strategy that he had developed while AOC-in-C of Bomber Command.

=== Awards ===
- Order of the Bath (Knight/Dame Grand Cross) (GCB) (Great Britain) (Note: Awarded 14 June 1945)
- Order of the British Empire (Officer) (OBE) (Great Britain) (Note: Awarded 1927 Birthday Honours)
- Air Force Cross (United Kingdom) (AFC) (Great Britain) (Note: Awarded 2 November 1918)
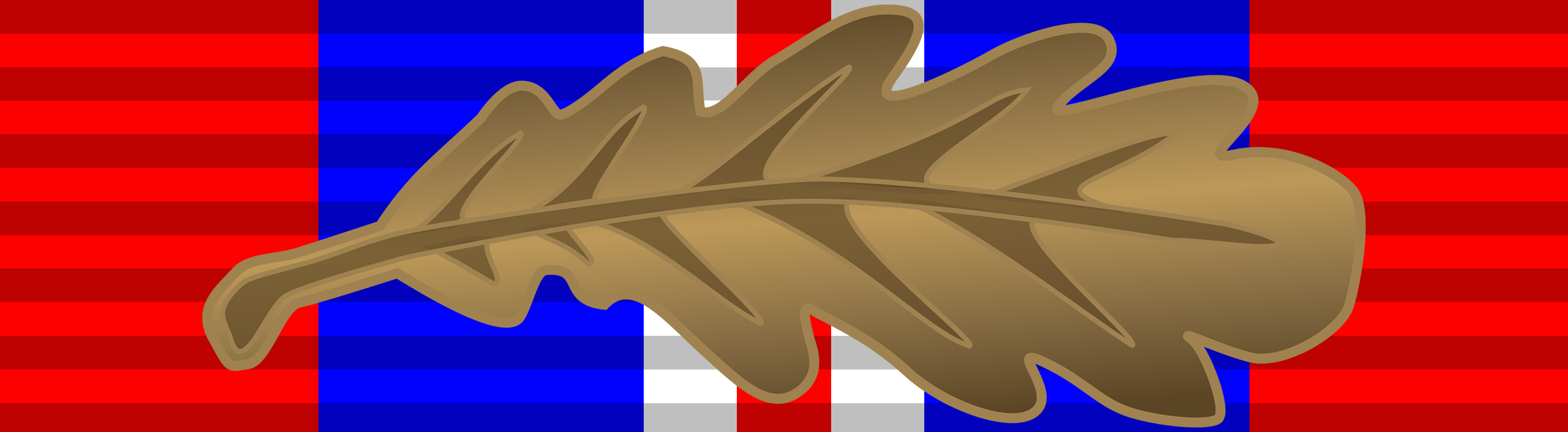
- War Medal 1939 – 1945 (Mentioned in Dispatches) (MID) (South Africa) x 2
- Order of Suvorov, 1st Class (USSR) (Note: Awarded 29 February 1944)
- Distinguished Service Medal (DSM) (US Army type) (Note: Awarded 14 June 1946)
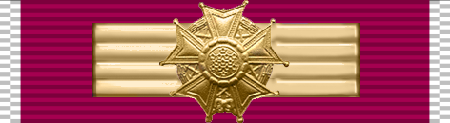
- Legion of Merit (Chief Commander) (LOM) (USA) (Note: Awarded 30 January 1945)
- Grand Cross of the Order of Polonia Restituta (Poland) (Note: Awarded 12 June 1945)
- National Order of the Southern Cross (Grand Cross) (Note: Portuguese: Ordem Nacional do Cruzeiro do Sul – Grã-Cruz) (Brazil) (Note: Awarded 13 November 1945)
- Legion of Honour (Grand Officer) (Note: French: Légion d'honneur - Grand-officier) (France) (Note: Awarded 1945)
- Croix de guerre 1939–1945 (Étoile en bronze - Bronze star) (France) (Note: Awarded 1945)

== Family ==
Harris married Barbara Daisy Kyrle Money, daughter of Lieutenant Ernle William K. Money, and his wife Alexandra Gruinard Battye, in August 1916. The marriage produced three children: Anthony, Marigold and Rosemary. Harris divorced his first wife in 1935 and subsequently met Therese ('Jillie') Hearne, then twenty, through a mutual friend, and they married in 1938. Their daughter Jacqueline Jill was born in 1939; Harris is said to have "adored" her. She later married the Hon. Nicholas Assheton, CVO, treasurer to Queen Elizabeth The Queen Mother from 1998 to her death in 2002, younger son of Ralph Assheton, 1st Baron Clitheroe.

== Legacy ==
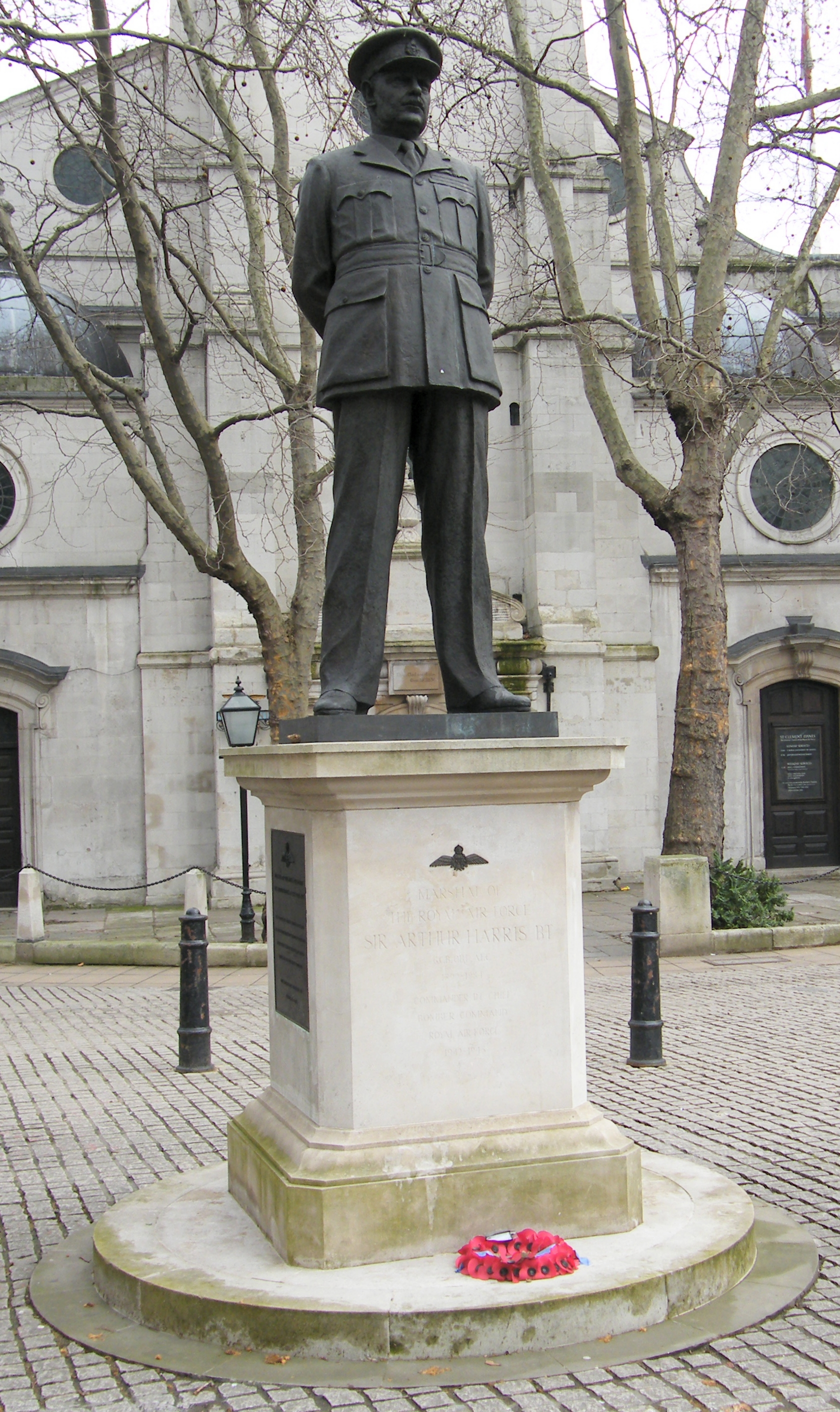
Statue of Harris outside St. Clement Danes

Harris died on 5 April 1984, at his home in Goring. He is buried in Burntwood Cemetery at Goring.

In 1989, five years after Harris's death, a one-off feature-length drama about Harris's tenure as AOC-in-C of Bomber Command was broadcast under the title Bomber Harris on BBC Television, with John Thaw in the title role.

Despite protests from public personalities within Germany, with the mayor of Dresden visiting the British embassy to state his opposition, the Bomber Harris Trust, an RAF veterans' organisation formed to defend the reputation of their former commander, erected a statue of him outside the RAF Church of St Clement Danes, London, in 1992. It was unveiled by Queen Elizabeth The Queen Mother, who looked surprised when she was jeered at by protesters, one of whom shouted, "Harris was a war criminal." No member of the cabinet attended the unveiling.

An inscription on the statue reads: "The Nation owes them all an immense debt." Many ex-Bomber Command aircrew were present, including Leonard Cheshire who attended against the advice of his doctors, saying "I would have gone even if I had to be carried on a stretcher", and died two months later. The statue had to be kept under 24-hour guard for a period of months as it was often vandalised.

== General references ==
- Bamford, Joe (1996). The Salford Lancaster. Pen & Sword Books. ISBN 978-0850525199.
- Bishop, Patrick (2007). Bomber Boys: Fighting Back 1940–1945. Harper Perennial. ISBN 978-0007192151.
- Corum, James S.; Johnson, Wray R. (2003). Airpower in Small Wars: Fighting Insurgents and Terrorists (Modern War Studies). University Press of Kansas. ISBN 978-0700612406.
- Cross, Robin (1995). Fallen Eagle. London: John Wiley and Sons Inc. ISBN 0-471-62079-3.
- Denson, John V (1999). The Costs of War: America's Pyrrhic Victories. Piscataway, New Jersey: Transaction Publishers. ISBN 0-7658-0487-5.
- Garret, Stephen A (1993). Ethics and Air Power in World War II: The British Bombing of German Cities. London: Palgrave Macmillan. ISBN 0-312-08683-0.
- Grayling, A. C. (2006). Among the Dead Cities: The History and Moral Legacy of the WWII Bombing of Civilians in Germany and Japan. New York: Walker Publishing Company Inc. ISBN 0-8027-1471-4.
- Grey, Peter (2003). The Last Word? Essays on Official History in the United States and British Commonwealth. Praeger, London. ISBN 0-313-31083-1.
- Harris, Sir Arthur (2005). Bomber Offensive. London: Greenhill Books. ISBN 1-84415-210-3.
- Hastings, Max (1979). Bomber Command. Dial Press/J. Wade. ISBN 978-0-8037-0154-0.
- Havers, Robin (2003). The Second World War: Europe, 1939–1943, Volume 4. Abingdon, Oxford, UK: Routledge. ISBN 978-0-415-96846-1.
- Longmate, Norman (1983). The Bombers: The RAF offensive against Germany 1939–1945. London: Hutchinson. ISBN 0-09-151580-7.
- McInnis, Edgar (1946). The War, The Sixth Year. Oxford University Press.
- Mierzejewski, Alfred C (1988). The Collapse of the German War Economy, 1944–1945: Allied Air Power and the German National Railway. Chapel Hill, NC: University of North Carolina Press. ISBN 0-8078-1792-9.
- Neutzner, Matthias (2003). Dresden 1944/45: Leben im Bombenkrieg. Verlag Der Kunst. ISBN 978-3865300300.
- Omissi, David E. (1990). Air power and colonial control : the Royal Air Force, 1919-1939. Manchester: Manchester University Press. ISBN 0719029600.
- Overy, Richard (2013). The Bombing War: Europe 1939–1945. London: Allen Lane. ISBN 978-0713995619. (Published in the United States as The Bombers and the Bombed: Allied Air War Over Europe, 1940–1945. New York: Viking. 2014. ISBN 978-0670025152.)
- Peden, Murray (2003). A Thousand Shall Fall: The True Story of a Canadian Bomber Pilot in World War Two. Dundurn Group. ISBN 978-1550024548.
- Pogue, Forrest C. (1954). United States Army in World War II European Theater of Operations The Supreme Command. Washington, D.C.: Office of the Chief of Military History, Department of the United States Army.
- Probert, Henry (2006). Bomber Harris: His Life and Times. London: Greenhill Books. ISBN 1-85367-555-5.
- Saward, Dudley (1990). Bomber Harris: The Authorized Biography. New York: Time-Warner Paperbacks. ISBN 978-0-72217-658-0.
- Shores, Christopher (1990). Above the Trenches: A Complete Record of the Fighter Aces and Units of the British Empire Air Forces, 1915–1920. London: Grub Street. ISBN 0-948817-19-4.
- Sokolski, Henry D. (2004). Getting MAD: Nuclear Mutual Assured Destruction, Its Origins and Practice. Carlisle, Pennsylvania: Strategic Studies Institute, U.S. Army War College. ISBN 1-58487-172-5.
- Speer, Albert (2009). Inside The Third Reich. Phoenix. ISBN 978-1842127353.
- Taylor, Fredrick (2004). Dresden: Tuesday 13 February 1945. New York: HarperCollins. ISBN 0-06-000676-5.

Military offices
Preceded by Pierre van Ryneveld	Officer Commanding No. 45 Squadron (acting); 18–24 August 1917	Succeeded by Awdry Vaucour
Unknown	Officer Commanding No. 45 Squadron; 1922–1924	Succeeded by Roderic Hill
Unknown	Officer Commanding No. 58 Squadron; 1925–1927	Succeeded by Ernest Norton
Preceded by Robert Leckie	Officer Commanding No. 210 Squadron; 1933	Succeeded by R H Kershaw
Preceded by Robert Leckie	Officer Commanding RAF Pembroke Dock; 1933	Succeeded by R H Kershaw
Preceded by Charles Portal	RAF Deputy Director of Plans; 1934–1937	Succeeded by John Slessor
Vacant Title last held by Charles Samson; In 1919	Air Officer Commanding No. 4 Group; 1937–1938	Succeeded by Charles Blount
Preceded by Roderic Hill	Air Officer Commanding RAF Palestine and Transjordan; 1938–1939	Succeeded by John D'Albiac
Preceded by William Bertram Callaway	Air Officer Commanding No. 5 Group; 1939–1940	Succeeded by Norman Bottomley
Preceded by Sholto Douglas	Deputy Chief of the Air Staff; 1940–1941	Succeeded by Norman Bottomley
Preceded by Jack Baldwin	Commander-in-Chief Bomber Command; 1942–1945	Succeeded by Sir Norman Bottomley
Baronetage of the United Kingdom
New title	Baronet (of Chipping Wycombe in the County of Buckingham); 1953–1984	Succeeded by Anthony Harris
