= King Edward's School, Bath =

Location
- North Road; Bath, Somerset, BA2 6HU; England; 51.3863°N 2.3436°W

Information
- Type: Private day school
- Motto: Dieu et mon droit (God and my right) Ministrare, non ministrari (To serve, not to be served)
- Established: 1552; 474 years ago
- Founder: King Edward VI
- Department for Education URN: 109374 Tables
- Chairman of the Governors: Winifred Thomson
- Headmaster: Martin Boden
- Staff: 70–90
- Gender: Coeducational
- Age: 3 to 18
- Enrolment: 1016
- Colours: Maroon and navy blue
- Publication: The Edwardian
- Former pupils: Old Edwardians
- Website: http://www.kesbath.com/

King Edward's School (KES), in Bath, Somerset, England, is a private co-educational day school providing education for 1,134 pupils aged 3 to 18. The school is a member of The Headmasters' and Headmistresses' Conference.

The school was established in the 16th century in a city centre site, founded in 1552. In the 1960s it moved to the outskirts onto a multi building site. In addition to the academic curriculum the schools includes drama, music, sport and a combined cadet force.

King Edward's School Bath was judged as "excellent" in every category in the school's 2015 Independent Schools Inspectorate (ISI) report. The report noted that "The school's extra-curricular provision is outstanding", "Achievements outside the curriculum are both numerous and outstanding" and "The quality of the pupils' achievements and learning is excellent".

The school was ranked as one of the top four independent schools in the south west by The Sunday Times Schools Guide Parent Power Survey, based upon 2016 academic results.

== History ==
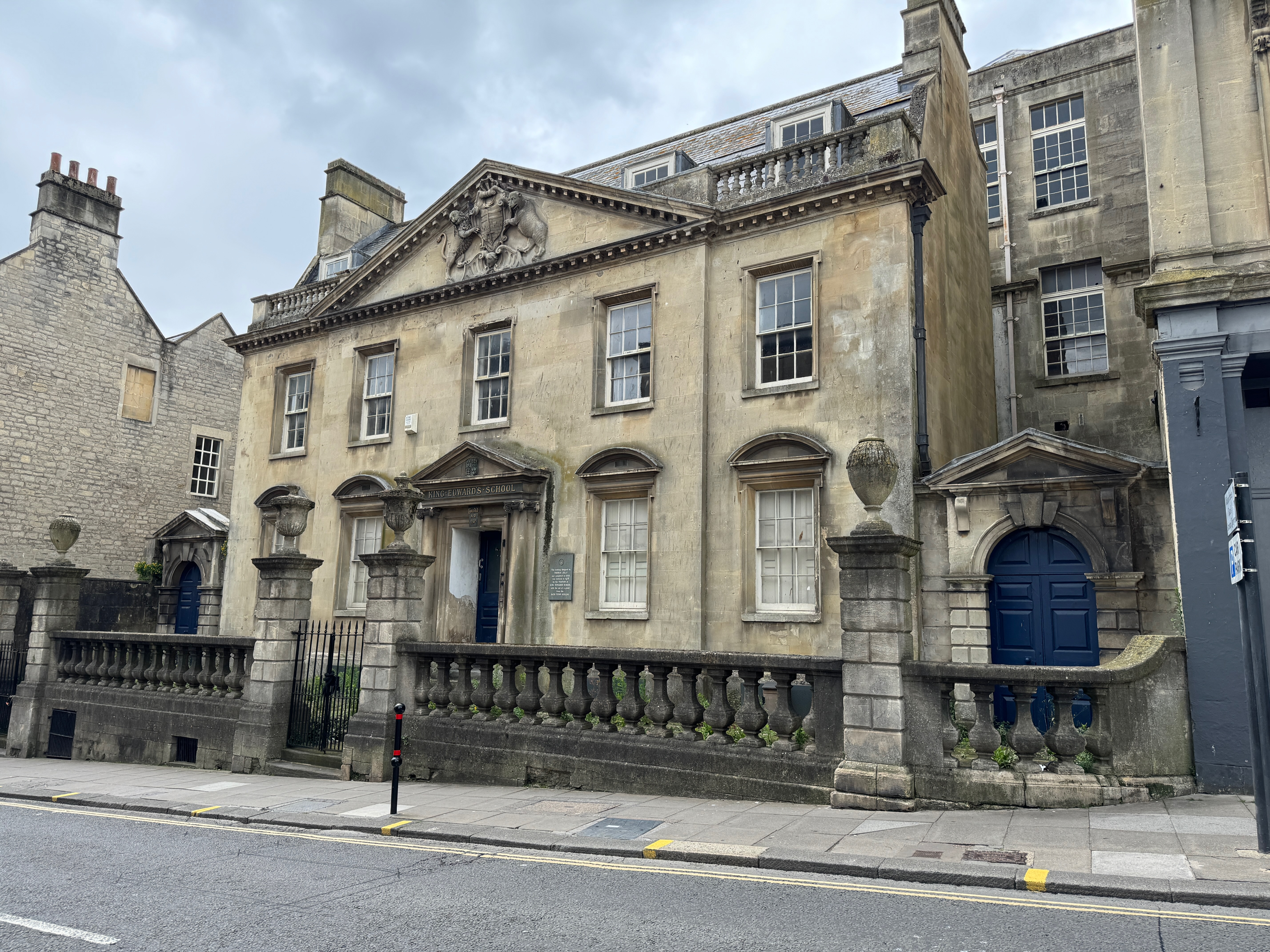
The school's Broad Street building

The school was founded in 1552 under laws set out in the Dissolution of Colleges Act 1545, which had been passed by Henry VIII to use funds from the dissolution of the monasteries to replace monastic grammar schools such as that run by Bath Abbey. The Mayor of Bath and one of the members of parliament for Bath, Edward Ludwell, petitioned Edward VI for land previously owned by the priory, to establish the school, initially in Frog Lane (present-day New Bond St) then outside the city walls, to support ten poor people, which also prevented the crown from selling off the land previously held by the priory. In 1583 the school moved to the disused Church of St Mary by the north gate of the city just within the city walls. The city corporation misappropriated the considerable funds from the land granted under Letters Patent, failing to maintain or improve the school until it was exposed in the Court of Chancery in 1734. John Stuckey, in his Complete History of Somersetshire (1742), reports that ajoining the City wall to the north side of the town is lately raised a neat stone building for a school-house.

In 1754, a new building was erected for the school in Broad Street (see Old King Edward's School).

The secondary school relocated from its site at Broad Street in central Bath in the 1960s to a 14-acre (57,000 m^{2}) site at North Road in the southeastern edge of the city, previously occupied by St Christopher's Preparatory School. The junior school (7- to 11-year-olds) remained on the Broad Street site until the summer of 1990 (often mis-quoted as 1986, possibly due to errors originally made in an architectural report from the early 2000s and repeated by the local Planning Office) when it transferred to a new building in the North Road school grounds.

In the 1990s, while Peter Winter was Headmaster the school took the steps towards full co-education. In 2005 there were plans to move the 'pre-preparatory' school, located in Weston, Bath, on to the North Road site. However, for a range of reasons it never materialised. In 2008 the school achieved the best examination results of Bath schools for A level and GCSE examination results.

== Site ==
The senior and junior school is on a 19-acre campus. The main block is used for English, maths, music, physics and chemistry, and incorporates the Wroughton Theatre. Nethersole House, which was built in the 19th century, houses the religious and philosophical studies department, classics, history, business studies, economics and learning support. The sixth form is in the Holbeche Centre, as are art and design and technology classrooms. The Wessex Building holds the Porter Library, Willet dining hall and a conference suite. The school has a drama centre, the Rose.And most recently The Thompson Building with language and geography classrooms

== Drama and music ==
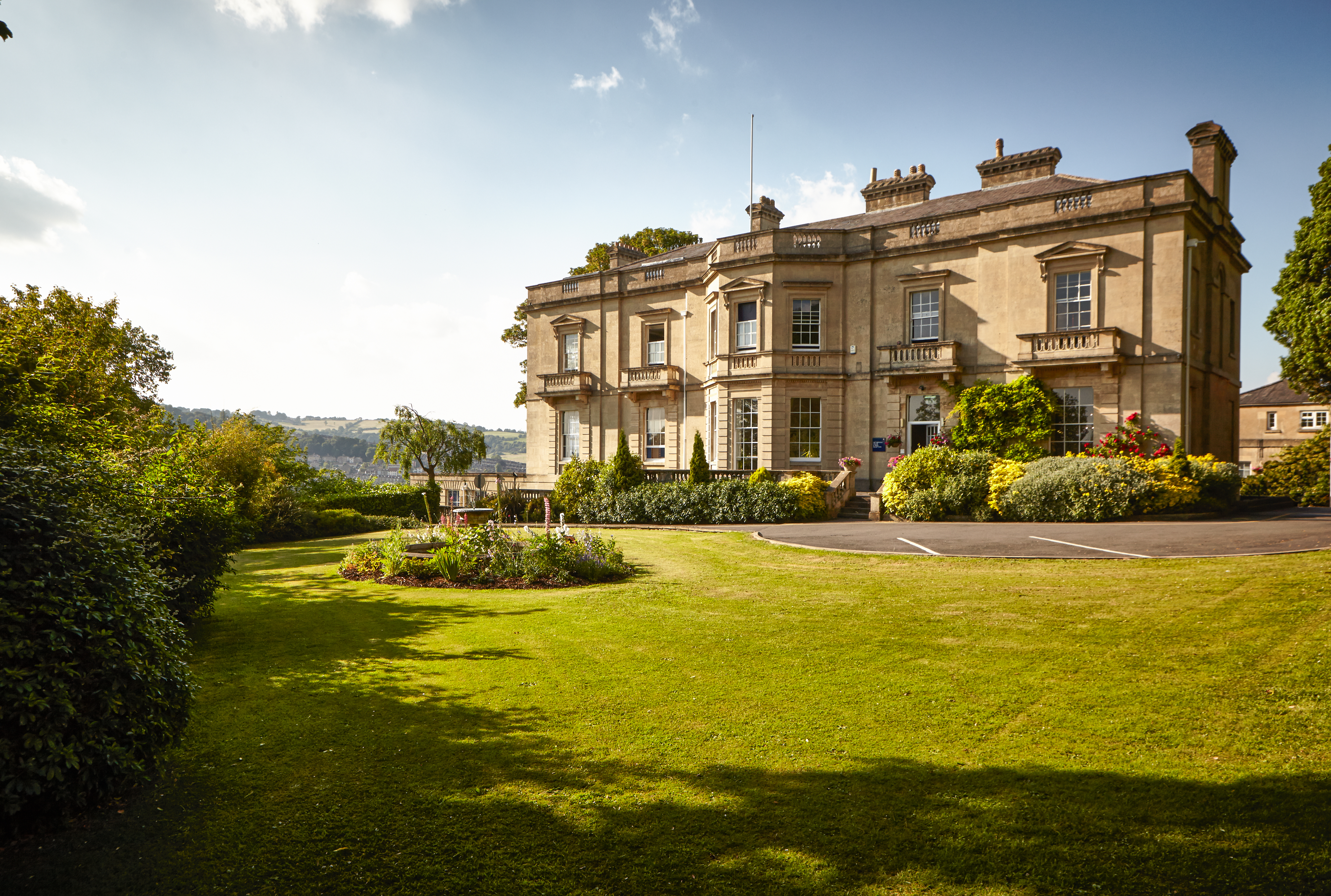
Nethersole House

The drama department puts on a school play each year. There is also a lower school play which is aimed for pupils in years 7 to 9. The school has also recently introduced LAMDA exams and taken a show to the Edinburgh Fringe.

The Senior Orchestra was the overall winner for orchestral music in the Mid Somerset Festival in 2006, 2007, 2009, 2010, 2011 2012 and 2024.

== Sport ==
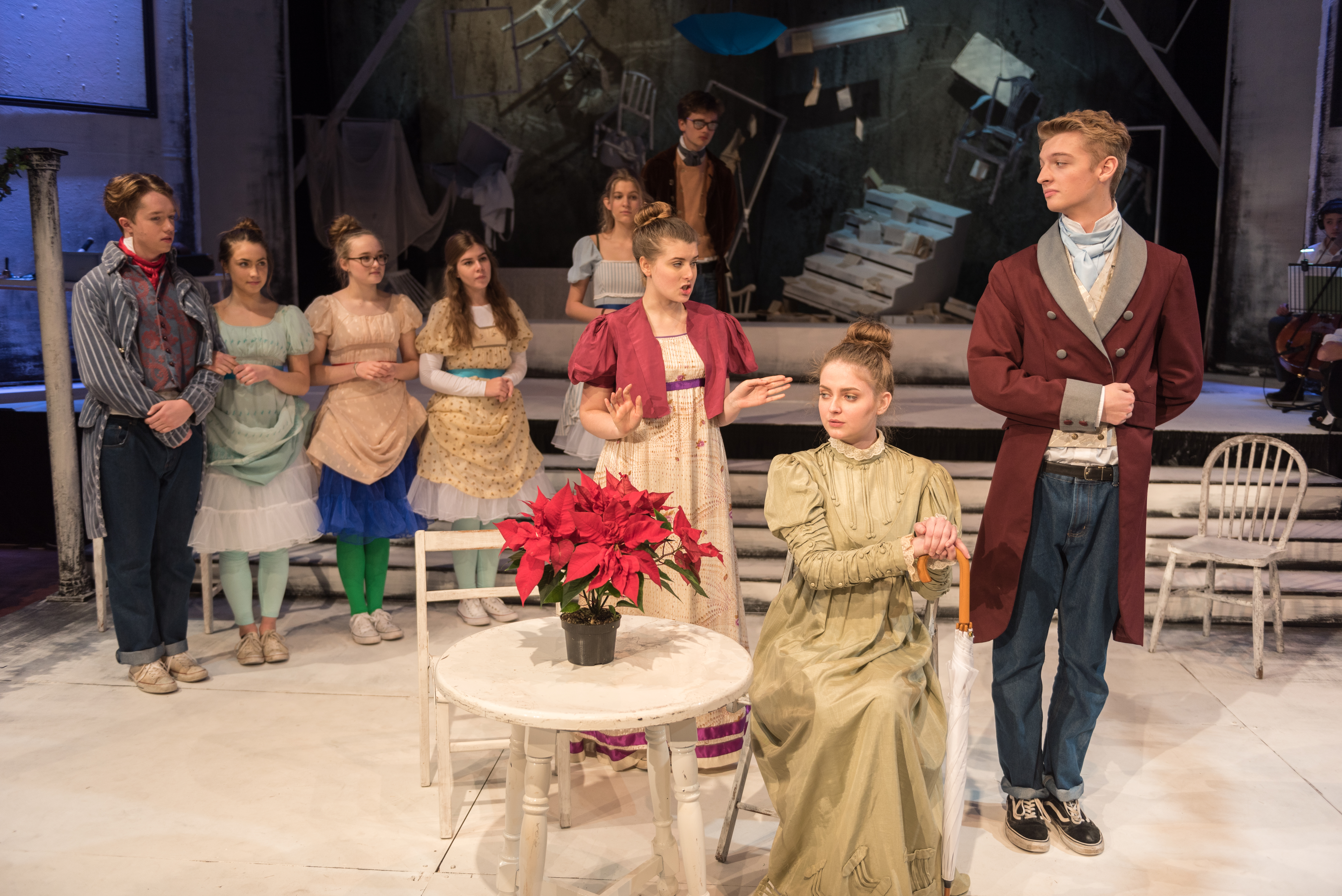
KES Pride and Prejudice

The school has a further 17-acre site at nearby Bathampton, which is home to the school's playing fields and sports pavilion. The major games are rugby, hockey, cricket and netball. Minor sports include athletics, cross-country, tennis, football, rounders, badminton, dance, gymnastics and table tennis. Former England rugby coach Andy Robinson used to teach rugby, physical education and mathematics at the school while he was playing (amateur rugby) for Bath Rugby Club.

In previous years the school had competitive netball squads over a range of school years. In particular, the under 19 squad came third at the national finals in both 2009 and 2010. Alternative sports such as judo and squash are also played.

== Combined Cadet Force ==
The school also has a Combined Cadet Force (CCF) which was formerly affiliated with the Light Infantry and is now affiliated to the King's Royal Hussars (Royal Armoured Corps). Having been founded in 1900, King Edward's CCF is one of the oldest CCF contingents in the country. Pupils, both girls and boys, may join the CCF from year 9 onwards. In 2019 the CCF formed a Corps of Drums, and since then has been taking cadets on ACF and CCF-run music training camps.

== International links ==
King Edward's School and Wagwer School in Kenya are global development partnership schools, part of the Department for International Development (DFID) initiative, which seeks to encourage an understanding and knowledge of the world though exchange visits and joint curricular work. Under the scheme which is sponsored by the British Government teachers from Kenya are able to visit KES and teachers from KES are able to visit Wagwer.

The school also runs exchange programmes with schools in Aix-en-Provence (France), Braunschweig (Germany) and Pamplona (Spain).

The school also produced two Olympians who represented Great Britain for the 2012 London Olympic Games.

== Controversy ==
In 2001, the school made national headlines after 26 pupils were taught the wrong Shakespeare play (Hamlet) in preparation for an A-level examination. The mistake was only realised after the pupils had entered the examination hall. The OCR exam board decided to award their marks according to previous papers and coursework.

In 2002, a 14-year-old girl had to be taken to hospital with alcohol poisoning during a trip to France.

In 2015, former teacher Timothy Snowdon, was jailed for four years for sexual assaults against a pupil that took place in the 1990s.

== Notable alumni ==
See also Category:People educated at King Edward's School, Bath

Former pupils of the school are called Old Edwardians and include:

- Bill Bailey – comedian, musician and actor
- Peter Chilvers – musician, software designer and Brian Eno collaborator
- Sebastian Cox – Military Historian
- General Sir Jack Deverell – Former Commander-in-Chief Northern Europe
- Adrian Flook – former Conservative MP for Taunton
- John Glen – Conservative MP for Salisbury
- Jonathan Green – science fiction and fantasy writer
- Ross Lowis Mangles – Recipient of the Victoria Cross
- Max Ojomoh – rugby player
- Sir William Edward Parry – Rear-admiral and Arctic explorer
- Tom Payne – Actor
- Norman Pounds – Geographer and historian
- Sir Ian Prosser – Deputy Chairman of BP
- Thomas de Quincey – Author and intellectual
- Chris Rapley – Director of the Science Museum
- Harold Sleigh – Founder of H.C.Sleigh Shipping Company, & Golden Fleece Petroleum Company, Melbourne, Australia.
- Henry Thomas (rugby union) – International rugby player
- Thomas Rosewell – Nonconformist minister accused of high treason
- Andrew Wakefield – Former surgeon and medical researcher famous for the MMR vaccine controversy
