= Mallett Antiques =

UK and US furniture and art dealer

Mallett is furniture and works of art agent and dealer based in London and New York. For most of the second half of the 20th century and the first decade of the 21st century, it occupied a position at the forefront of the English furniture trade, profiting from the growth in interest in the style of British and European 18th and 19th century furniture and works of art.

Founded in 1865, Mallett & Son Antiques was one of England's oldest dealers of fine furniture and works of art. They specialized in English and Continental furniture and decor. In 2017 Mallett was officially wound up by its last owner, Stanley Gibbons Ltd. It was purchased in 2018 by Gurr Johns, the international art advisory, brokerage and appraisals company with offices in London and New York. In 2023, Mallett was relaunched as part of the Gurr Johns Group, led by Rufus Bird, former Surveyor of the Queen's Works of Art and Christie's furniture specialist.

== History ==
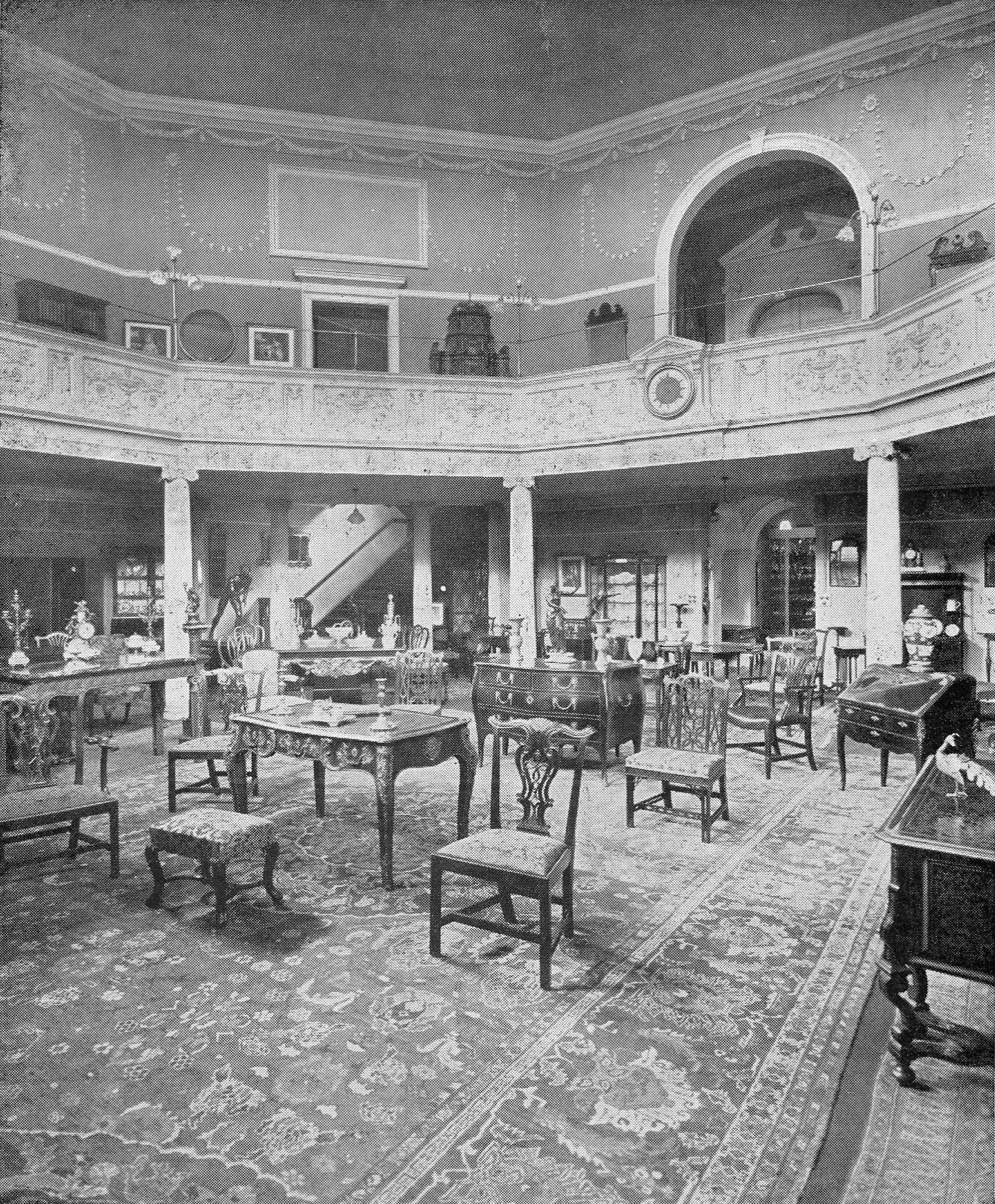
A rare photograph of the Mallett Showrooms at the Octagon Chapel, Bath, circa 1900

The company was founded in 1865 by John Mallett (a jeweller and silversmith) at 36 Milsom Street, Bath, Somerset, England. His son, Walter Ellis Mallett, who had joined his father's business in 1874, quickly assumed complete control, and today he is acknowledged by Mallett as the real founder of the firm. It was he who expanded the stock to include old silver and furniture and who arranged for the purchase of the lease of the Octagon Chapel. This building had originally, in 1767, been designed as a church by the architect Thomas Lightholder, whose brief was to produce a structure which would be warm, comfortable and well lit. The Octagon fulfilled all of these requirements, and it became the most fashionable church in Bath. Eminent and distinguished visitors made a point of engaging a pew for as long as they stayed in the city, hiring it at the same time as they hired their lodgings. The most expensive of these were like small rooms, each with its own fireplace and easy chairs. Between service and sermon, an interval was allowed during which footmen poked the fires and saw that their master and mistress were comfortable. The vaults of this building were let out to a wine merchant, which gave rise to the verses by Christopher Anstey:

Spirits above and spirits below,
Spirits of Bliss and spirits of woe,
The spirits above are spirits Divine,
The spirits below are spirits of wine.

Since the building was leasehold, it was never consecrated, so when it fell into disuse in the 1890s Mallett's took it over. New showrooms were built on each side of the church, with workshops and storage in the basement. A gas engine was installed to drive the polishing lathes, work the lift, make the electric light and, by means of a fan, circulate air through every part of the building. With the improvement in communications, express trains serviced the West Country to and from London and facilitated attendance at the spa, bringing much added interest and business to Mallett's at the Octagon.

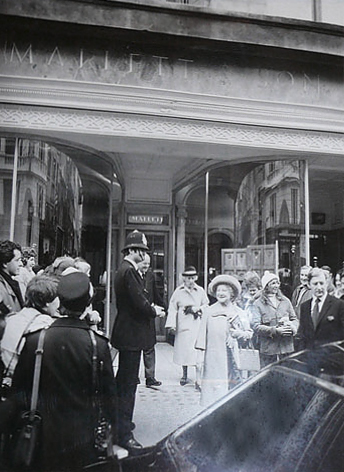
The Queen Mother visiting Mallett at 40 New Bond Street, 1981

In 1908 the Franco-British Exhibition (1908) was held at Earls Court in London, and the firm took a stand there. This was such a successful venture that Walter Mallett decided to open a permanent shop in London, and he took a lease of premises at 40 New Bond Street, which contained showrooms on two floors displaying stock of furniture including mirrors, pictures and objects, each room arranged to re-create the atmosphere of a private house.

On his death in 1930, the business passed to a consortium of six of his employees, who in 1937 decided to close the Octagon premises and move the whole business to London. Francis Mallett became chairman. On his death he left a large part of his collection to the Ashmolean Museum at Oxford. After the Second World War, under the chairmanship of Francis Egerton, Mallett's began to evolve into a dealership of international stature.

Mallett's have an association with museums and private collections all over the world including the Victoria and Albert Museum.

In 1983 Francis Egerton retired and in 1987, under the new management, Mallett became a public company. Lanto Synge assumed the role of chief executive until his retirement in 2009. Lanto Synge has had a number of books published on antiques and on antique needlework, a particular specialty of his, including Art of Embroidery – A history of Style and Technique, produced in conjunction with the Royal School of Needlework. In 1999 he published Mallett Millennium, illustrated throughout with photographs from the extensive Mallett archives.

In 1991, the Bond Street business moved to new enlarged premises at 141 New Bond Street with twelve showrooms.

In 2012 Mallett moved its premises to Ely House, 37 Dover Street. This classical townhouse was built as the London palace for the Bishop of Ely. It is, like Mallett's first gallery in Bath, an architectural masterpiece and a Grade I listed building, designed by the neo-classical architect Robert Taylor in 1772 for Robert Keene, the Bishop of Ely. From 1894 until recently it was occupied by the Albemarle Club, whose members included artists and authors such as Oscar Wilde.

== Mallett at Bourdon House, 1962–2007 ==
Mallett's second business was established in 1962 at Bourdon House, in Mayfair, until 1953 the London house of the 2nd Duke of Westminster. Built for William Burdon Esq in the years 1723–25, during the reign of George I, the house stood amidst fields and market gardens between the then emerging Berkeley and Hanover Squares. Mallett sold Bourdon House in 2007.

== Mallett Inc, New York ==
In 2003, Mallett opened a New York Gallery at 929 Madison Avenue and East 74th Street. Mallett completely renovated the New York Brownstone building and offered stock sent over from the London showrooms.

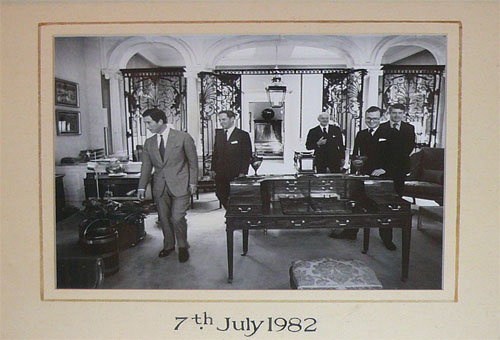
The Prince of Wales visiting Mallett in 1982 with Lanto Synge, Francis Egerton, Peter Maitland and Peter Dixon

== Expansion since 2006 ==
Since 2006, Mallett expanded further and established three new and distinct companies, James Harvey British Art, Meta and Hatfields Restoration.

=== James Harvey British Art ===
Operated for several years from 2006 from 15 Langton Street, Chelsea, SW10. The gallery is dedicated to promoting British Artists from the 17th century to the present day. With an emphasis on the less established names of the eighteenth and nineteenth centuries, the gallery will also promote traditional figurative contemporary art.

=== Meta ===
Meta has commissioned designers, including Asymptote Architecture, Hani Rashid and Lise Anne Couture, Edward Barber & Jay Osgerby, Tord Boontje, Matali Crasset and Wales & Wales to create contemporary objects and furniture.

=== Hatfields Restoration ===
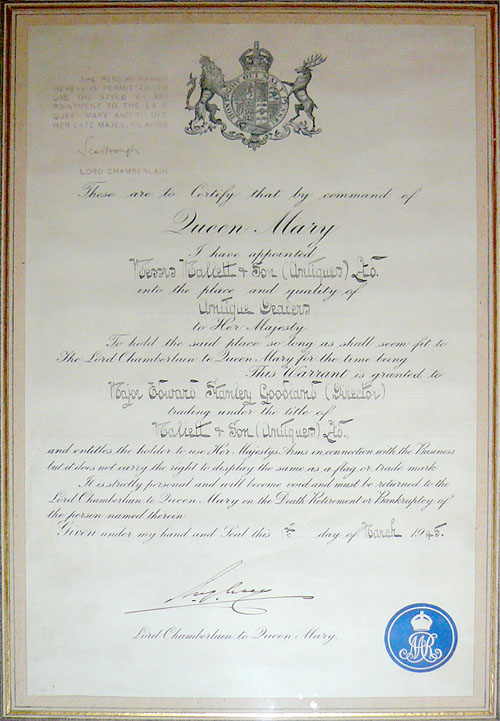
Mallett enjoyed Royal Patronage for many years; this is one such Warrant from Queen Mary, dated 1945

In 2007 Mallett merged with Hatfields and took over premises in London on Clapham High Street. Scholars House is a late 18th-century building from which the company is developing a range of restoration services. Hatfields has a history which dates back to 1834 when the original Hatfield family established the firm. Initially founded to produce miniature frames, the company expanded to include furniture workshops, restoring and conserving furniture and works of art for Royalty, private and museum collections throughout the world. In the 1930s the company noted on its letterhead that it had warrants from Queen Victoria, The Prince of Wales & King Edward VII. They worked extensively at Buckingham Palace for Queen Mary, adding gilt bronze plinths to the base of Sevres vases, so that the relatively small scale of the vases would appear more substantial in the setting of the State Rooms.
