= Ian Prosser =

British businessman

Sir Ian Maurice Gray Prosser (born 5 July 1943) is a British businessman.

Prosser was born in Bath, England and educated at King Edward's School, Bath, Watford Grammar School for Boys and Birmingham University.

He retired in 2021 from positions of Chairman BP Pension Trustees, Chairman Navy Army & Airforce Institute and Chairman of GamCare. He was Chairman & CEO of Bass Brewery and latterly Chairman of IHG Hotels & Resorts until his retirement in 2003. He is a former non-executive Deputy Chairman of BP, having joined as a non-executive Director in 1997 and retired on 15 April 2010. He was formerly senior independent director of GlaxoSmithkline, a non-executive director of Boots, of Lloyds TSB. Hillshire Brands (formerly Sara Lee) Chairman of the Aviva Staff Pension Scheme and Chairman of Navy, Army & Air Force Institute.

Prosser received his knighthood in the 1995 New Year Honours list. Prosser was awarded an honorary DUniv by the University of Birmingham in 2001.
