= Milsom Street =

Historic site in Bath, Somerset, England

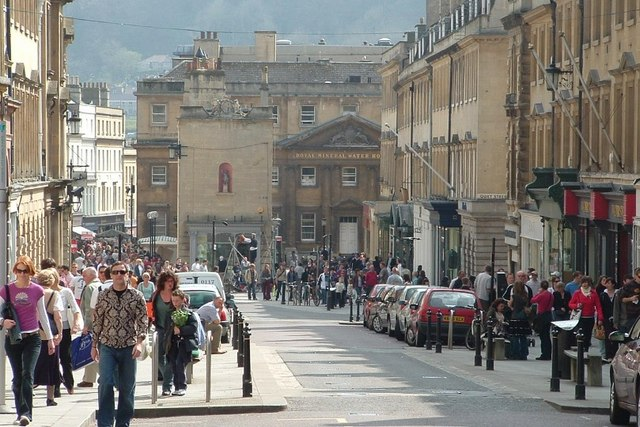

- Location within Somerset
- 51°23′02″N 2°21′41″W
- Location: Bath, Somerset, England

History
- Built: 1762

Site notes
- Architect: Thomas Lightholder

Listed Building – Grade II*
- Official name: Numbers 37 to 42
- Designated: 14 July 1955
- Reference no.: 1395987

Listed Building – Grade II*
- Official name: Octagon Chapel
- Designated: 14 July 1955
- Reference no.: 1396027

Listed Building – Grade II
- Official name: Numbers 2 to 22
- Designated: 12 June 1950
- Reference no.: 443087

Listed Building – Grade II
- Official name: No 24 (National Westminster Bank)
- Designated: 5 August 1975
- Reference no.: 446686

Listed Building – Grade II
- Official name: Numbers 25 to 36
- Designated: 12 June 1950
- Reference no.: 443088

Listed Building – Grade II
- Official name: Numbers 43 to 47
- Designated: 12 June 1950
- Reference no.: 443090

Milsom Street in Bath, Somerset, England, was built in 1762 by Thomas Lightholder. The buildings were originally grand townhouses, but most are now used as shops, offices and banks. Most have three storeys with mansard roofs and Corinthian columns.

Numbers 2 to 22 are Grade II listed. The bank at number 24 was built by Wilson and Willcox and includes baroque detail not seen on the other buildings. Numbers 25 to 36 continue the architectural theme from numbers 2 to 22.

Numbers 37 to 42, which are known as Somersetshire Buildings, have been designated as Grade II* listed buildings.

The Octagon Chapel was a place of worship, then a furniture shop by Mallett Antiques. It opened briefly as a restaurant, which has subsequently closed. It is accessed beside number 46.

As a fashionable Georgian thoroughfare, Milsom Street is quoted in several of the works of Jane Austen, including Northanger Abbey and Persuasion.

In the 2010, Google Street View's Best Streets Awards, Milsom Street was voted "Britain's Best Fashion Street" by the 11,000 participants.

== See also ==
- List of Grade I listed buildings in Bath and North East Somerset
- Thomas Jelly, architect of much of Milsom Street
