= Henry Probert =

British military historian (1926–2007)

Air Commodore Henry Austin Probert MBE (R.A.F.), M.A. (23 December 1926 – 25 December 2007) was a Royal Air Force officer and historian, who was the Royal Air Force's Director of Education from 1976 to 1978.

== Early life ==
Henry Austin Probert was born on 23 December 1926, and spent his childhood in Cheadle, Cheshire. He received his formal education at Cheadle Hulme School, and read Modern History at Sidney Sussex College, Cambridge, where he developed a life-long passion for rowing, before joining the Royal Air Force, initially as a conscript under the terms of the United Kingdom's National Service Act 1948, being granted a temporary commission as a pilot officer in the Education Branch on 4 November 1948.

== Royal Air Force career ==
During his career Probert served as an R.A.F. Education officer at RAF Ballykelly in Ulster, in West Germany, at the RAF Technical College, at RAF Changi, at the Air Ministry in London, at the Headquarters of Bomber Command (where whilst carrying out his duties he developed a scholastic interest in the controversial conduct of Marshal of the Royal Air Force Sir Arthur Harris's command of the arm in World War II), and at the R.A.F. Staff College.

Whilst in the R.A.F. he coached its sports rowing crews, and later became the President of the service's Rowing Association.

In 1976 Probert was appointment to the office of the Royal Air Force's Director of Education, which he held until his retirement from the R.A.F. in 1978.

== Air Historical Branch ==
On retiring from the R.A.F. he was appointed to the post of Head of the Air Historical Branch in the Air Ministry, which he held from 1978 to 1989, during which time he oversaw the writing of the official narrative of the Royal Air Force in the Falklands War.

== Historian ==
In 1986 Probert helped to found the 'Royal Air Force Historical Society'. In retirement Probert wrote several books on Royal Air Force history, most notably: Bomber Harris: His Life and Times, an apologia work detailing the career of Marshal of the Royal Air Force, Sir Arthur "Bomber" Harris, which challenged the shadow that lay over his reputation for his command of the air attacks by R.A.F. Bomber Command upon German cities during World War II, with their consequentially high civilian casualty rates. During the research for this book Probert was granted access by Harris' family to Harris' private papers, and his resulting conclusions were published in 2001. He also continued to lecture at the R.A.F. Staff as well as other military colleges.

In 2002 he was awarded the Air League's Gold Medal in recognition of his work in the field of the study of the Royal Air Force's history.

== Death ==
Probert died on Christmas Day 2007 in his 82nd year.

Posthumously the R.A.F Historical Society created a bursary in Probert's memory, awarded to facilitate academic studies in the field of R.A.F. history.

== Personal life ==
Probert married in 1955, the marriage producing a son and a daughter.

== Publications ==
- The Battle Re-thought: A Symposium on the Battle of Britain (1991) [Editor].
- Mission Improbable: A Salute to Royal Air Force Women in the Special Operations Executive in Wartime France (1991) [Foreword only].
- High Commanders of the R.A.F (1991).
- The Forgotten Air Force: A History of the Royal Air Force in the War against Japan 1941–1945 (1995).
- Bomber Harris, His Life & Times (2001).
- 128: The Story of the Royal Air Force Club (2004).
- The Rock & the Royal Air Force (2005).
- The History of Changi (2006).

Government offices
Preceded by E B Haslam	Head of the Air Historical Branch; 1978 – 1989	Succeeded by I Madelin
