= Harold Sleigh =

Australian merchant and ship-owner

Harold Crofton Sleigh (SLEE; 19 May 1867 – 24 April 1933) was an Australian businessman, founder of H. C. Sleigh and Company, involved in shipping and petroleum distribution, best known for its Golden Fleece products and service stations.

== History ==
Sleigh was born in Westbury-on-Trym, Bristol, England to Hamilton Norman Sleigh and Anna Elizabeth Sleigh, née Ward, whose residence in 1881, was Belmont House, Bitton. He was educated at Bath Grammar School and worked for several businesses before gaining employment with the Union Bank of London which was chiefly concerned with overseas clients, so gained some knowledge of international shipping practice. He left for Australia in 1888 and became involved in barge traffic on the Murray and Darling rivers.

=== Shipping ===
Sleigh owned the steamers Emu from 1891 and Ethel Jackson from 1892 or earlier. Both operated on the Darling River out of Bourke.

Around 1893 he began working for Harrold Brothers, ship brokers and owners of Melbourne, and while with that company he privately tendered for a contract in which his employers were interested. His resignation was accepted and well advertised. He won the contract, which was to carry coal from Newcastle for the Western Australian Government Railways for two years.

He took a six-month charter of SS Eskdale and two sister ships Tangier and Asphodel, which were more than capable of filling the contract, plus general cargo and passengers in steerage, for which there was a strong demand, especially to the goldfields. William Cave of Adelaide acted as agent, then in August 1896 Howard Smith's recently (1890) formed Intercolonial Steamship Company took over the contract.

Around the same time he ordered two cargo steamers, Cape Leeuwin and Cape Otway, from Russell & Company of Glasgow, but no sooner had they been launched, than Sleigh's Australian Transport Company sold them to the Australasian United Steam Navigation Company (AUSNC)

In 1898 he chartered the AUSNC steamer Victoria to carry kauri logs from Kaipara, New Zealand, to Port Phillip and pioneered the commercial shipping of horses by the steamer Ashley, and in 1899 opened the live sheep and cattle export trade to Southern Africa when 500 bullocks and 1,000 sheep were sent by the China Mutual Company's steamer Ningchow from Brisbane to Laurenco Marques.

By the end of the century his trade with South Africa had increased immensely, notably by steamers Inchmona, Henley, Florence Pile, Glanton, Beira, Moel Eilian and George Pyman. His "Blue Star Line" included steamers Baron Eldon and Venetia. In 1902 he floated in London the Colonial Steamship Company to carry freight between Melbourne, Durban and New Zealand, and was granted a subsidy of £30,000 by the New Zealand Government. In 1909 he won a contract for a fortnightly shipping service between Melbourne and Fiji.

Sleigh was also a successful ship broker, finding Japanese buyers for the collier Alabama in 1924, Chinese buyers for Corio in 1926, Moorabool and four NZ ships in 1928 and Mawatta in 1937.

In 1925 Sleigh won the Coastal Shipping Service contract to service the many Northern Territory coastal and island communities from Darwin, using the steamer Kinchela. In 1926 he purchased the 500-ton German steamer Mars, (Note: Twin-screw steamer built at Bremerhaven in 1906, converted to oil-burning in 1926) renamed Marion Sleigh, as a replacement. The contract was terminated within a year and the ship was put into weekly service Sydney–Newcastle. In 1932, after a few years lying idle in Sydney Harbour, she was sold and renamed Port Whangarei.

=== Petroleum ===
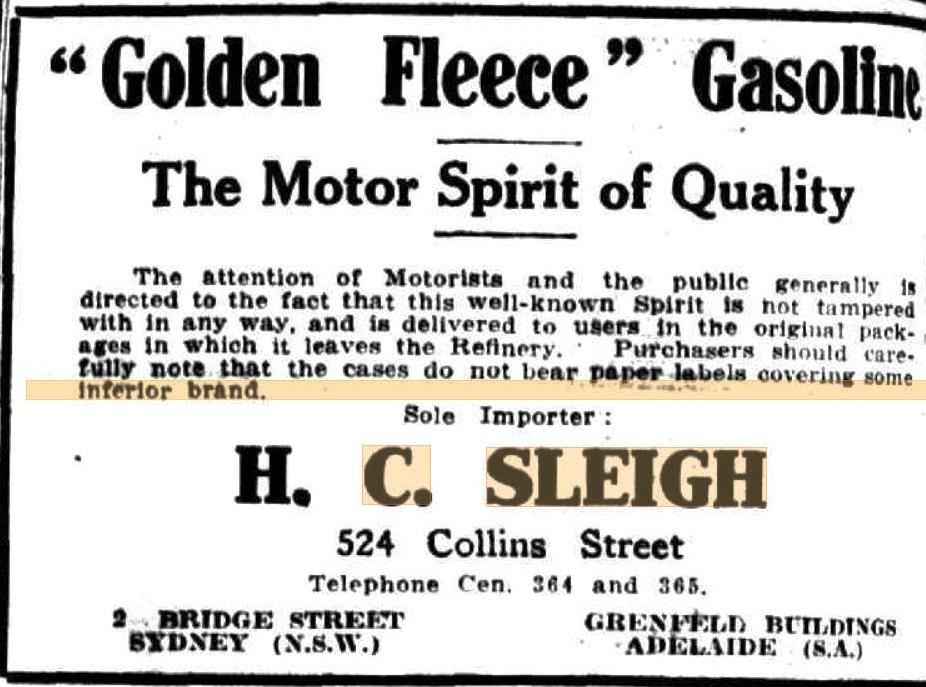
1919 advertisement

According to one account, Sleigh started in the petroleum trade in 1913, when a customer was unable to pay freight on a shipment of petrol, and the company took possession of the consignment.

In 1917 he registered the trade name "Golden Fleece" for "illuminating, heating and lubricating oils, including petrol, benzine and kerosene", and the following year was clearly marketing "benzine" (Note: Not to be confused with the chemical now known as benzine, as distinct from benzene, a probable constituent of "motor spirit".) as a fuel for motorcycles.

He orhanised a Californian oil company to supply four-gallon (US five-gallon) cans of petrol, branded Golden Fleece to his order. Petrol was in those days shipped, and sold, in four-gallon (18 litre) cans, roughly cubic in shape, two to the wooden case. By 1923, shipments of petrol were arriving monthly; the March consignment of 13,000 cases (104,000 imperial gallons (470,000 L; 125,000 US gal)) arrived on Vinita. By June 1926 Golden Fleece fuel was also shipped in 44-gallon (Note: 44.0 imperial gallons (200 L; 52.8 US gal)) drums and dispensed at the garage or service station from a kerbside "bowser". (Note: Essentially a large graduated glass vessel on a pedestal, perhaps teo metres in height. The fuel was pumped into the vessel to the desired volume, then released into the customer's fuel tank or container via a flexible hose.) In 1930 Sleigh began shipping bulk petrol by the tanker Mexico.

==== Promotion ====
The company's advertising was initially directed at motorcycle enthusiasts; around 1915 Sleigh became personally interested in motor-cycling, and began sponsoring trophies for the Victorian Motorcycle Club. In 1923 he sponsored a record-breaking motorcycle ride, Adelaide to Sydney (1,280 miles (2,060 km)) in 40 hours 9 min. He supported automobile club events to a similar extent, but was greatly overspent by the likes of Dunlop and the motor car retailers.

==== Premises ====
In 1919 the company had an outlet at 2 Bridge Street, Sydney, selling Summit lubricating oils and Golden Fleece gasoline. By 1923 it had premises at 228–230 Pirie Street, Adelaide and a bulk storage depot at Albert Park. The facility was destroyed in 1929 by fire.

=== Other commodities ===
In 1921 Sleigh, with A. Coombs and J. T. Caldwell, secured a lease on Solomon Islands timber. He had one of the few licences to ship Australian sandalwood to China from the Port Pirie – Port Augusta region of South Australia.

== Personal ==
Sleigh married Marion Elizabeth Chapple (1869 – 20 June 1941) on 5 June 1895 at St John's Church, Melbourne. She was daughter of John William Chapple and Marion Chapple, née Dowsett. Their only son Hamilton Morton Howard Sleigh (20 March 1896 – 24 November 1979) became partner, and on his father's death took over the company as chairman and chief executive.

Sleigh was appointed Honorary Finnish Vice-Consul for Victoria in 1922.

In 1926 he travelled to London, partly on business, but notably to consult specialists regarding a mysterious affliction affecting his foot. No treatment helped, and the leg was amputated.

Sleigh became seriously ill in December 1932 and died aged 65 at his home "Laradoc", 111 Walsh Street, South Yarra and was buried at the Box Hill Cemetery.

== Recognition ==
A 13,000-ton tanker, launched 1953, was named Harold Sleigh in his honour.
