= Old King Edward's School =

King Edward's School
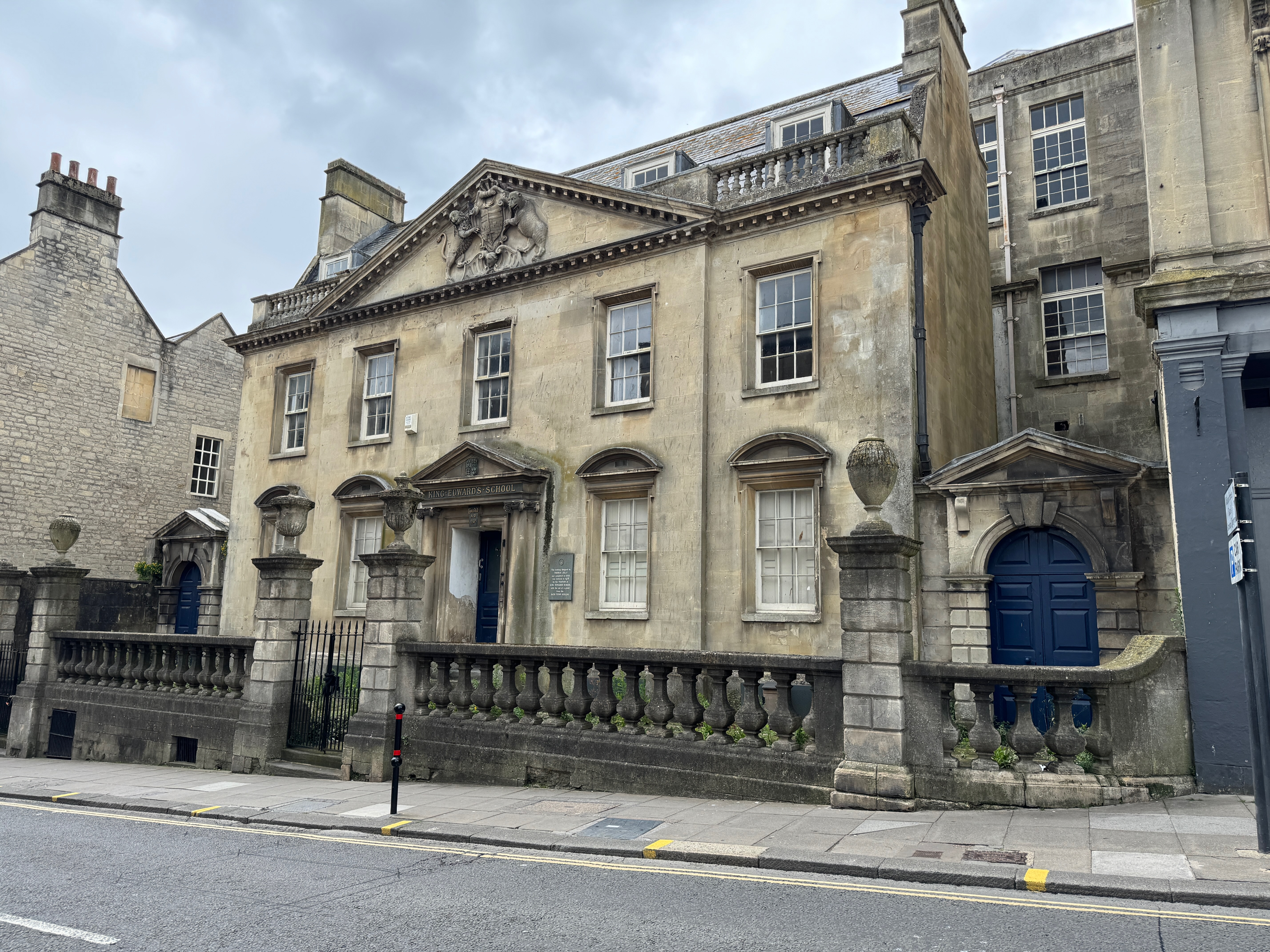
- The building in 2024

Location
- Broad Street; Bath, Somerset, BA1 1RS; England; 51.384273°N 2.360444°W

Information
- Motto: Dieu et mon droit (God and my right) Ministrare, non ministrari (To serve, not to be served)
- Established: 1754 (272 years ago)
- Founder: King Edward VI
- Closed: 1990 (36 years ago)
- Former pupils: Old Edwardians

Old King Edward's School is a former school building in Bath, Somerset, England. Standing on Broad Street, opposite Saracen Street, which was created in the 1970s, the building was completed in 1754, almost 200 years after the school was established, the work of Thomas Jelly. It is now a Grade II* listed building, having been registered in 1950.

== History ==
The city's grammar school had since 1589 been housed in the disused St Mary's within the Walls. The Bath Corporation asked John Wood the Elder to prepare plans for a new school building in 1742. Following a disagreement with Wood over the location, the Corporation bought the Broad Street site in 1744 and appointed Thomas Jelly. The balustrade is a more recent addition.

It was King Edward's School from 1752 to 1990, after the school moved from the nave of the disused Church of St Mary's Northgate, where it had been for almost 200 years. In 1990, after just under 250 years, the junior school followed the secondary school's relocation to a new site on North Road at the southeastern edge of the city around 25 years earlier.

In 1997, an application to turn the building into a public house by Samuel Smith Old Brewery was refused, although it still owns the property. A scheme for use as a hotel has also been withdrawn.

The building remains on the Heritage at Risk Register. Proposals to use it as a temporary shelter for the homeless were rejected in 2018 by the brewery, claiming that work would be "commencing very soon". As of 2025, it remains vacant and increasingly derelict.

== Architecture ==
The building, which stands on the former site of the Black Swann Inn, is two storeys with four dormers and five sash windows. It has a central pediment with a coat of arms and a central doorway with a pediment on Ionic half columns.
