= Octagon Chapel, Bath =

Octagon Chapel
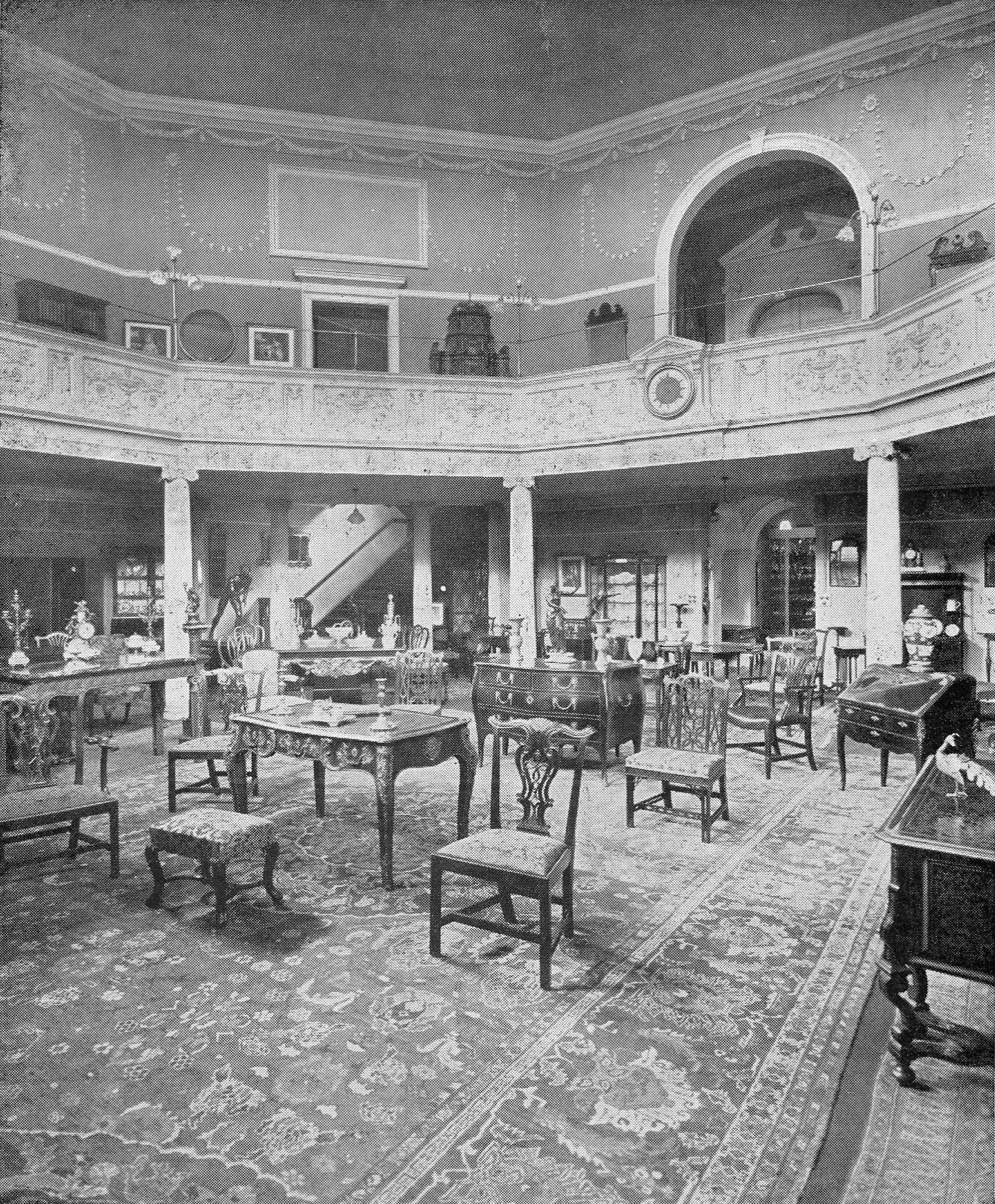
- A photograph of the Mallett Showrooms at the Octagon Chapel, circa 1900.

- Location within Somerset
- 51°23′02″N 2°21′41″W
- Location: 39 Milsom Street, Bath, Somerset BA1 1DS, England

History
- Built: 1767

Site notes
- Architect: Timothy Lightholder

Listed Building – Grade II*
- Designated: 14 July 1955
- Reference no.: 1396027

The Octagon Chapel in Milsom Street, Bath, Somerset, England was built in 1767 and has been designated as a Grade II* listed building.

== History ==
The building was designed as a church by the architect Timothy Lightholder (or Lightoler), whose specific brief was to produce a structure which would be warm, comfortable and well lit. The Octagon fulfilled all of these requirements, and it became a fashionable church. Eminent and distinguished visitors, including Jane Austen, made a point of engaging a pew for as long as they stayed in the city, hiring it at the same time as they hired their lodgings. The most expensive of these were like small rooms, each with its own fireplace and easy chairs. Between service and sermon, an interval was allowed during which footmen poked the fires and saw that their master and mistress were comfortable. The church, as a popular venue to "see and be seen", was not popular with The 'Enthusiastics', later known as Methodists.

William Herschel was appointed as the organist in 1766 and gave his introductory concert on 1 January 1767. As the organ was still incomplete he performed his own compositions including a violin concerto, an oboe concerto and a harpsichord sonata. The organ was completed in October 1767. The organ was built by John Snetzler. Part of the keyboards and pipes have survived and are on display at the Herschel Museum of Astronomy.

In 1858 William Connor Magee published a book of sermons he had given at the chapel.

The vaults of this building were let out to a wine merchant, which gave rise to the verses by Christopher Anstey:

Spirits above and spirits below,
Spirits of Bliss and spirits of woe,
The spirits above are spirits Divine,
The spirits below are spirits of wine.

Since the building was leasehold, it was never consecrated, so when it fell into disuse in the 1890s Mallett Antiques took it over. New showrooms were linked into each side of the church, with workshops and storage in the basement. A gas engine was installed to drive the polishing lathes, work the lift, make the electric light and, by means of a fan, circulate air through every part of the building.

Mallets was described in Drapers Record, 26 December 1908, as "the most sumptuous shop in Europe, the wares of which include practically priceless curios and treasures of historic association. Probably not under one roof may be found more millionaires in the course of a year than at Mallett's, in Bath, in the whole of the Kingdom."

In World War II it was used as a food office and after the war was restored, opening as an art exhibition space for the Bath Festival of 1951.

It later served as the headquarters of the Royal Photographic Society.

In 2004 the local authority, Bath and North East Somerset announced a deal with the L and R Group to convert much of the site to retail and restaurant use but ensure the Grade II* listed building was maintained and improved. In 2008 to 2009 the old showrooms were converted for retail and restaurant use but the original Octagon Chapel remained unfurnished and with no permanent tenant for some years and was used frequently for exhibitions, art shows, retail, catering, events and festivals. In 2015 the former chapel became a Burger & Lobster restaurant. However this closed in January 2017.

As of March 2019, the Octagon Chapel is leased as a bar and restaurant to The Botanist.

== See also ==
- 18th-century Western domes
