= Thomas Jelly =

18th century English architect

- Born: c. 1720
- Died: 1781
- Occupation: Architect

Thomas Jelly (c. 1720–1781) was an English architect, prominent in the second half of the 18th century.

== Career ==
After undertaking an apprenticeship with carpenter Methusalem Hutchins, Jelly worked closely with Henry Fisher, Bath's principal builder of the time.

He became master of architect John Palmer in the 1770s.

== Selected works ==
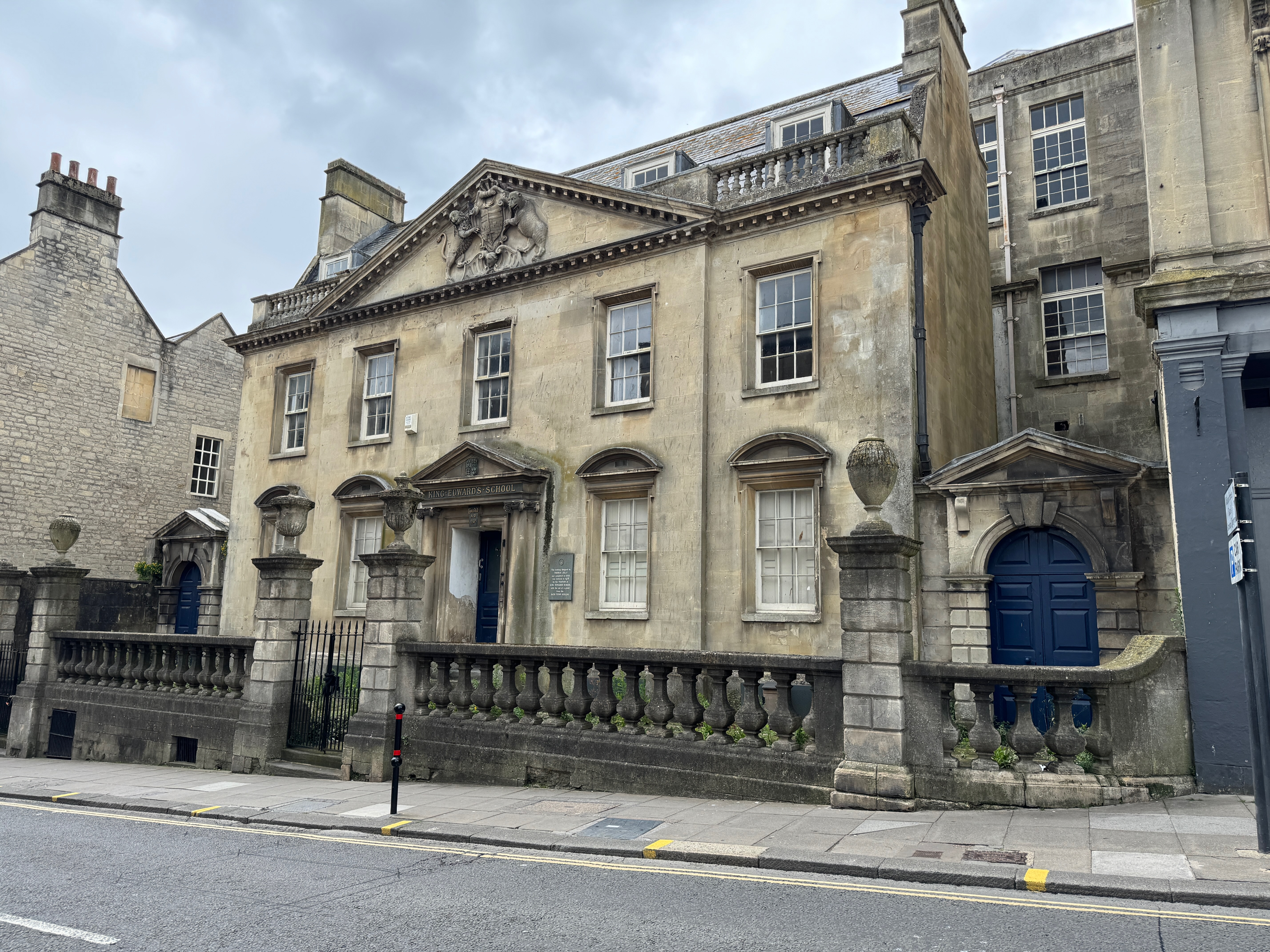
Old King Edward's School

- Old Orchard Street Theatre, Bath (1750) – now a Grade II listed building
- Old King Edward's School, Bath (1752) – now a Grade II* listed building
- Kingston Baths, Bath
- Development of Milsom Street, Bath
- St James Parish Church, Bath

== Personal life ==
Jelly was made a freeman of Bath in 1741.
