= Sebastian Cox =

Sebastian Cox OBE (born in 1956), was the Head of the Air Historical Branch (AHB) of the Royal Air Force, a specialist archive and history unit based at RAF Northolt, Middlesex, which seeks to maintain and preserve the historical memory of the RAF and to develop and encourage "an informed understanding of RAF and air power history by providing accurate and timely advice to Ministers, the RAF, other government departments and the general public". He has worked at the AHB since 1984 and been its Head since May 1996.

== Life ==
Cox attended the King Edward School in Bath. He is a graduate of Warwick University and King's College London. He was curator of documents at the Royal Air Force Museum, Hendon, before joining the Air Historical Branch as a researcher in 1984. He is the first civilian to serve as its Head. He was made OBE on the 2017 Queen's Birthday Honours List for services to the Royal Air Force and aviation heritage.
