= Golden Fleece Company =

Former Australian retail fuel chain

- Type: Public (1947–1981)
- Industry: Oil and gas
- Founded: Melbourne, Australia (1893)
- Defunct: 1981 (merged into Caltex Australia)
- Headquarters: Australia
- Key people: Harold Sleigh and John McIlwraith
- Products: Petrochemical products and retail service stations
- Parent: HC Sleigh & Co 1893–1981; Caltex Australia 1981–2020; Ampol 2020–present

Golden Fleece was an Australian brand of petroleum products and service stations operated by Harold Sleigh and Company, a business founded in Melbourne, Australia in 1893 by shipowner and merchant Harold Crofton Sleigh (1867–1933) and manufacturer and shipowner John McIlwraith (1828–1902).

According to one account, Sleigh started in the petroleum trade in 1913, when a customer was unable to pay freight on a shipment of motor spirit, and the company took possession of the consignment. He later sold the tins of "motor spirit" at a significant profit, leading to the idea for reselling fuel.

In 1917, Sleigh registered the trade name "Golden Fleece" for "illuminating, heating and lubricating oils, including petrol, benzine and kerosene", and the following year was clearly marketing "benzine" (Note: Not to be confused with the chemical now known as benzine, as distinct from benzene, a probable constituent of "motor spirit".) as a fuel for motorcycles.

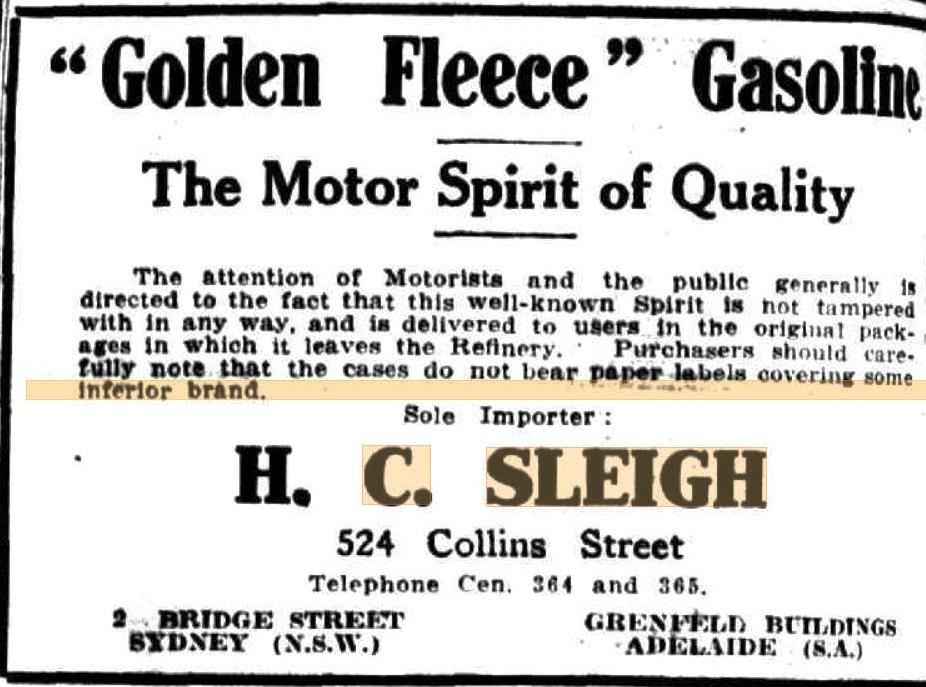
Advertisement placed in the Melbourne Herald of 20 October 1919

Initially, the company sold motor spirit in drums only—the first Golden Fleece pump being installed in 1920.

Golden Fleece was a pioneer of single-branded service stations (as opposed to the more common multi-brand offerings of the era), and its distinctive "golden merino" trademark was soon a common sight for Australian motorists.

The post-war era saw a massive expansion of Australia's motor industry and car ownership soared. The company was made public in 1947. Purr Pull was a brand marketed by Independent Oil Industries of Sydney. They also sold Purr Star and Resis Oil. The company was bought out by Smith Wylie (Aust) Pty Ltd in Queensland who ran the company as Purr Pull Industries and then in June 1954, H.C. Sleigh merged with Purr Pull Industries, with the Purr Pull and Star brands dropped and all operations rebranded as Golden Fleece.

The 1950s and 1960s were boom times for the Golden Fleece brand and expansion and acquisitions were the trend. H.C. Sleigh Limited acquired Hardie Rubber in January 1960 (a producer of tyres and Coolite expanded polystyrene foam), and the fledgling Kangaroo and Phillips 66 brands in 1962 and 1967 respectively. During these years, many (if not most) Golden Fleece service stations became roadhouse-style outlets with restaurants and bold signage.

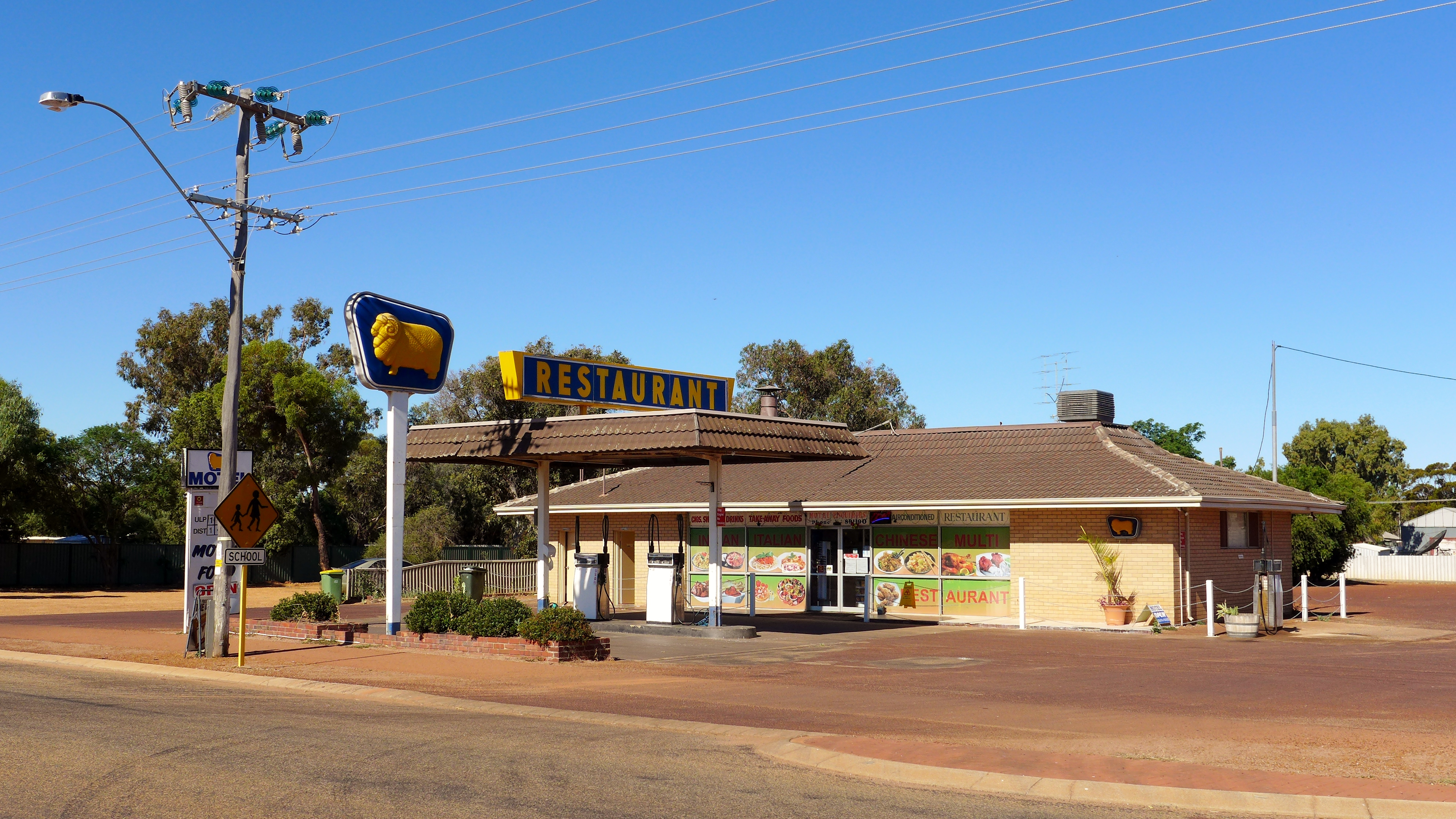
A Golden Fleece roadhouse in Kondinin, Western Australia in 2014

At its peak, Golden Fleece had about 5,000 service stations, roadhouses and distributors nationwide, and was also the operator of Australia's largest restaurant chain. In some towns, the Golden Fleece roadhouse was the only restaurant; local residents would go there for dinner.

Some time during the 1960s or 1970s Golden Fleece gained a major contract by the, then small, major trucking company Linfox, that is still held by Ampol today, due to a friendship between Regional Manager for Victoria Max Collins and Lindsay Fox.

The company never had its own oil refinery and depended on Caltex to facilitate the importation and refining of crude oils at Kurnell Refinery in Sydney on its behalf. In the late 1970s the industry started to mature and rationalise due to soaring crude oil prices, and Federal Government oversight of petrol and diesel prices which was a subtle form of price control. Inevitably Golden Fleece was itself acquired by Caltex in 1981 and no longer trades under that name, though its unique livery can still be seen on some older roadhouses in rural Australia. A particular treasure for collectors are the globes (in the shape of the Golden Fleece ram) that sat atop the company's pumps until the 1970s, when the pumps were standardised.

As of 2024, the Golden Fleece brand was owned by Ampol (corporate successor to Caltex Australia). According to an Ampol spokesman, "Golden Fleece holds iconic status as a brand and forms an important part of Ampol's storied history. Ampol always has ongoing conversations about its brands and their role in its wider portfolio."

== Executive ==
- Harold Sleigh, co-founder and chairman
- John McIlwraith, 1893–1902, co-founder
- Hamilton Moreton Sleigh, 1933–1975, chairman and CEO
- Peter Sleigh, 1975–1981, chairman and CEO

== See also ==
- List of automotive fuel retailers
- List of convenience stores
