= Norman Longmate =

English author, social and military historian (1925–2016)

Norman Longmate (15 December 1925 - 4 June 2016) was an English author and social and military historian.

He was educated at Christ's Hospital and Worcester College, Oxford, where he read Modern History. Author of 31 books, and of various radio documentaries, he often worked as a historical adviser on TV programmes, including the BAFTA-award-winning How We Used to Live. He was made a Fellow of the Royal Historical Society in 1981. Longmate died in June 2016 at the age of 90. He was married to and separated from Elizabeth (née Taylor), who was a deputy head teacher. She died in 2011. His daughter, Jill, was a teacher, writer and historian who died in 2023 aged 63.

== Works by Norman Longmate ==
=== Miscellaneous ===
- A Socialist Anthology (Phoenix House) 1953
- Oxford Triumphant (Phoenix House) 1954
- Writing for the BBC (BBC Publications) 1966 (1st edition) to 1988 (8th edition)

=== Detective Stories ===
- Death Won't Wash (Cassell) 1957
- A Head for Death (Cassell) 1958
- Strip Death Naked (Cassell) 1959, Garland Publishing, New York, 1989
- Vote for Death (Cassell) 1960
- Death in Office (Robert Hale) 1961

=== Careers Books ===
- Keith in Electricity (Chatto & Windus) 1961
- Electricity Supply (Sunday Times) 1961
- Electricity as a Career (Batsford) 1964

=== General Social History ===
- King Cholera: the Biography of a Disease (Hamish Hamilton) 1966
- The Waterdrinkers: a History of Temperance (Hamish Hamilton) 1968
- Alive and Well: Medicine and Public Health 1830 to the Present Day (Penguin Education) 1970
- The Workhouse (Temple Smith) 1974, (Pimlico) 2003
- Milestones in Working Class History (BBC Publications) 1975
- The Hungry Mills: the Story of the Lancashire Cotton Famine 1861-5 (Temple Smith) 1974
- The Breadstealers: the Fight Against the Corn Laws 1838-46 (Temple Smith) 1984 (St Martin's Press, New York) 1984

=== History of the Second World War ===
- How We Lived Then: a History of Everyday Life during the Second World War (Hutchinson) 1971, (Arrow Books) 1973, (Pimlico) 2002
- If Britain Had Fallen (BBC Publications and Hutchinson) 1972; (Stein and Day, New York) 1974, (Arrow Books) 1975, (Greenhill Books, London & Stackpole Books, Mechanicsburg, Philadelphia) 2004
- The Real Dad's Army: the Story of the Home Guard (Hutchinson) 1974, (Arrow Books) 1974, (Amberley) 2010
- The GIs: the Americans in Britain 1942-1945 (Hutchinson) 1975
- Air Raid: the Bombing of Coventry, 1940 (Hutchinson) 1976, (Arrow Books) 1978, (David McKay, New York) 1978
- When We Won the War: the Story of Victory in Europe, 1945 (Hutchinson) 1977
- The Doodlebugs: the Story of the Flying Bombs (Hutchinson) 1981, (Arrow Books) 1986
- Hitler's Rockets: the Story of the V2s (Hutchinson) 1982, (Pen & Sword Books) 2009
- The Bombers: the RAF Offensive Against Germany (Hutchinson) 1983, (Arrow Books) 1988
- The Home Front: an Anthology of Personal Experience 1938-1945. Edited with a Preface. (Chatto & Windus) 1986

=== General Military History ===
- Defending the Island: From Caesar to the Armada (Hutchinson) 1989, (Grafton Books) 1990, (Pimlico) 2001
- Island Fortress: the Defence of Great Britain 1603-1945 (Hutchinson) 1991, (Grafton Books) 1993, (Pimlico) 2001

=== Autobiography ===
- The Shaping Season: an Author's Autobiography - Childhood and Schooldays (Fairford Press) 2000 & 2001
