= Air Historical Branch =

The Air Historical Branch (AHB) is the historical archive and records service of the Royal Air Force.

First established in 1919, the AHB was responsible for creating the Official History of British Air Operations in the First World War.

The branch moved from RAF Bentley Priory to RAF Northolt in 2008 after the closure of the former. The Air Historical Branch is tasked with the maintenance and preservation of the history of the RAF. It is part of the Royal Air Force Centre for Air Power Studies and is headed by Dr Sebastian Ritchie.

== Heads of the Air Historical Branch ==
Date commenced	Date ended	Head	Notes
1918	1920	Captain C Fairbairn RAF	
1920	1923	H A Jones	
1923	1933	Captain J Morris	
1933	1936	H A Jones	
Air Historical Branch disestablished from 1936 to 1941
1941	1958	J C Nerney	
1958	1971	Louis Jackets	
1971	1978	Group Captain Edward Haslam	
1978	1989	Air Commodore Henry Probert	
1989	1996	Group Captain Ian Madelin	
1996	2025	Sebastian Cox	First civilian Head
2025		Dr Sebastian Ritchie	
