= General Arbuthnot =

General Arbuthnot may refer to:

- Bingham Arbuthnot (1803–1867), British East India Company major general
- Charles George Arbuthnot (1824–1899), British Army lieutenant general
- Charles George James Arbuthnot (1801–1870), British Army general
- Dalrymple Arbuthnot (1867–1941), British Army brigadier general
- Hugh Arbuthnot (British Army officer) (1780–1868), British Army general
- Keith Arbuthnott, 15th Viscount of Arbuthnott (1897–1966), British Army major general
- Robert Arbuthnot (British Army officer) (1773–1853), British Army lieutenant general
- Thomas Arbuthnot (1776–1849), British Army lieutenant general
