= George Arbuthnot =

George Arbuthnot may refer to:

- George Arbuthnot (civil servant) (1802–1865), British civil servant
- George Arbuthnot (politician) (1836–1912), British politician
- George Gough Arbuthnot (1848–1929), businessman and civil leader in British India
- George Bingham Arbuthnot (1803–1867), major-general in the Honourable East India Company
- George Arbuthnot (priest) (1846–1922), Archdeacon of Coventry

== See also ==
- Charles George Arbuthnot (1824–1899), British Army officer
- Charles George James Arbuthnot (1801–1870), British general
- Arbuthnot (disambiguation)
