= Thomas Arbuthnot =

British Army general (1776–1984)

Lieutenant-General Sir Thomas Arbuthnot KCB
- Born: 11 September 1776; Rockfleet Castle, County Mayo, Kingdom of Ireland
- Died: 26 January 1849 (aged 72); Salford, England, United Kingdom
- Military career
- Allegiance: (United Kingdom of Great Britain and Ireland) United Kingdom
- Branch: British Army
- Rank: Lieutenant-General
- Commands: Northern District
- Awards: Knight Commander of the Order of the Bath

Lieutenant-General Sir Thomas Arbuthnot, KCB (11 September 1776 – 26 January 1849) was a British Army officer. He served in the Peninsular War and later commanded the Northern and Midland Districts in England.

== Military career ==
He was born in Rockfleet Castle, County Mayo, Ireland, the sixth son of John Arbuthnot, Sr of Rockfleet. He entered the British Army as an ensign in the 29th Regiment of Foot in November 1795. He was promoted to lieutenant in the 40th Regiment of Foot in May 1796 and to captain in the 8th West India Regiment in June 1798. He then joined the Quarter-master General's department and served under Sir John Moore on the Peninsula from May 1803.

Arbuthnot was promoted to major in the 5th West India Regiment in the West Indies in April 1808 before being appointed assistant adjutant-general in General Picton's division for the greater part of the Peninsular War. He was twice wounded, once in the West Indies and again in one of the actions in the Peninsula. Promoted to lieutenant-colonel, he became deputy quartermaster general at the Cape of Good Hope in May 1810. He was appointed an aide-de-camp to the Prince Regent in February 1812, promoted to brevet colonel in June 1814 and appointed a Knight of the Order of the Bath in 1815.

Promoted to major-general in May 1825, Arbuthnot was sent next year to Portugal in command of a brigade. He afterwards commanded a district in Ireland, and having attained the rank of lieutenant-general in June 1838, was appointed, in 1842, to the command of the Northern and Midland Districts in England, which command he retained until his death.

He also served as colonel in turn of the 99th (Lanarkshire) Regiment of Foot from August 1836, of the 52nd Foot from December 1839, of the 9th Regiment of Foot from December 1844 and of the 71st Highlanders from February 1848.

He died unmarried at his residence in The Crescent, Salford.

== Family ==
He was brother of General Sir Robert Arbuthnot, KCB and Charles Arbuthnot and bishop Alexander Arbuthnot. He was uncle of Sir Alexander John Arbuthnot, Major General George Bingham Arbuthnot and Lieutenant General Sir Charles George Arbuthnot.

Military offices
| Preceded by William Gomm | GOC Northern District; 1842–1849 | Succeeded by Lord Cathcart |
| Preceded by Sir Thomas Reynell, 6th Baronet | Colonel of the 71st (Highland) Regiment of Foot; 1848–1849 | Succeeded by Sir James Macdonell |
| Preceded by Sir John Cameron | Colonel of the 9th (East Norfolk) Regiment of Foot; 1844–1848 | Succeeded by Sir James Archibald Hope |
| Preceded by Sir George Walker, 1st Baronet | Colonel of the 52nd (Oxfordshire) Regiment of Foot; 1839–1844 | Succeeded by Sir Edward Gibbs |
| Preceded by Sir Colin Campbell | Colonel of the 99th (Lanarkshire) Regiment of Foot; 1836–1839 | Succeeded by Hugh Gough, 1st Viscount Gough |
