= Fort Scratchley =

Museum and former coastal defence site in Newcastle, New South Wales

- Newcastle East, New South Wales
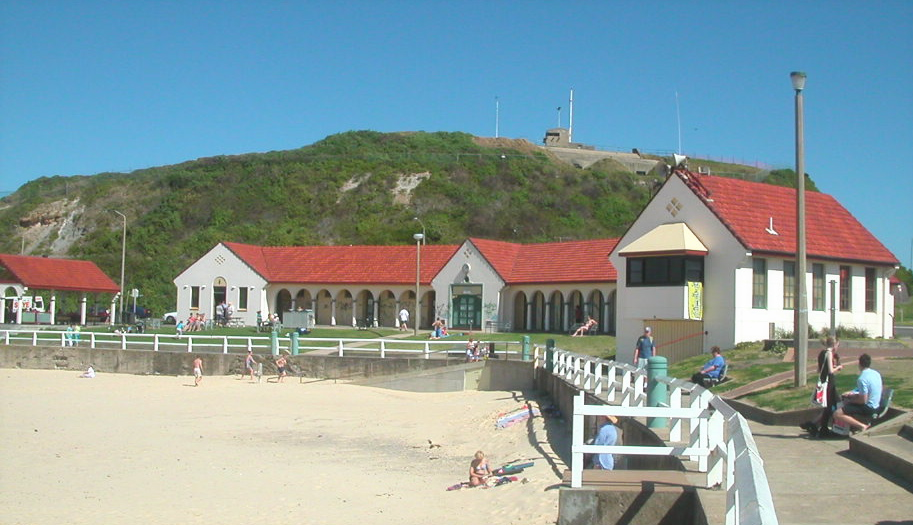
- Fort Scratchley (on hilltop) viewed from Nobbys Beach

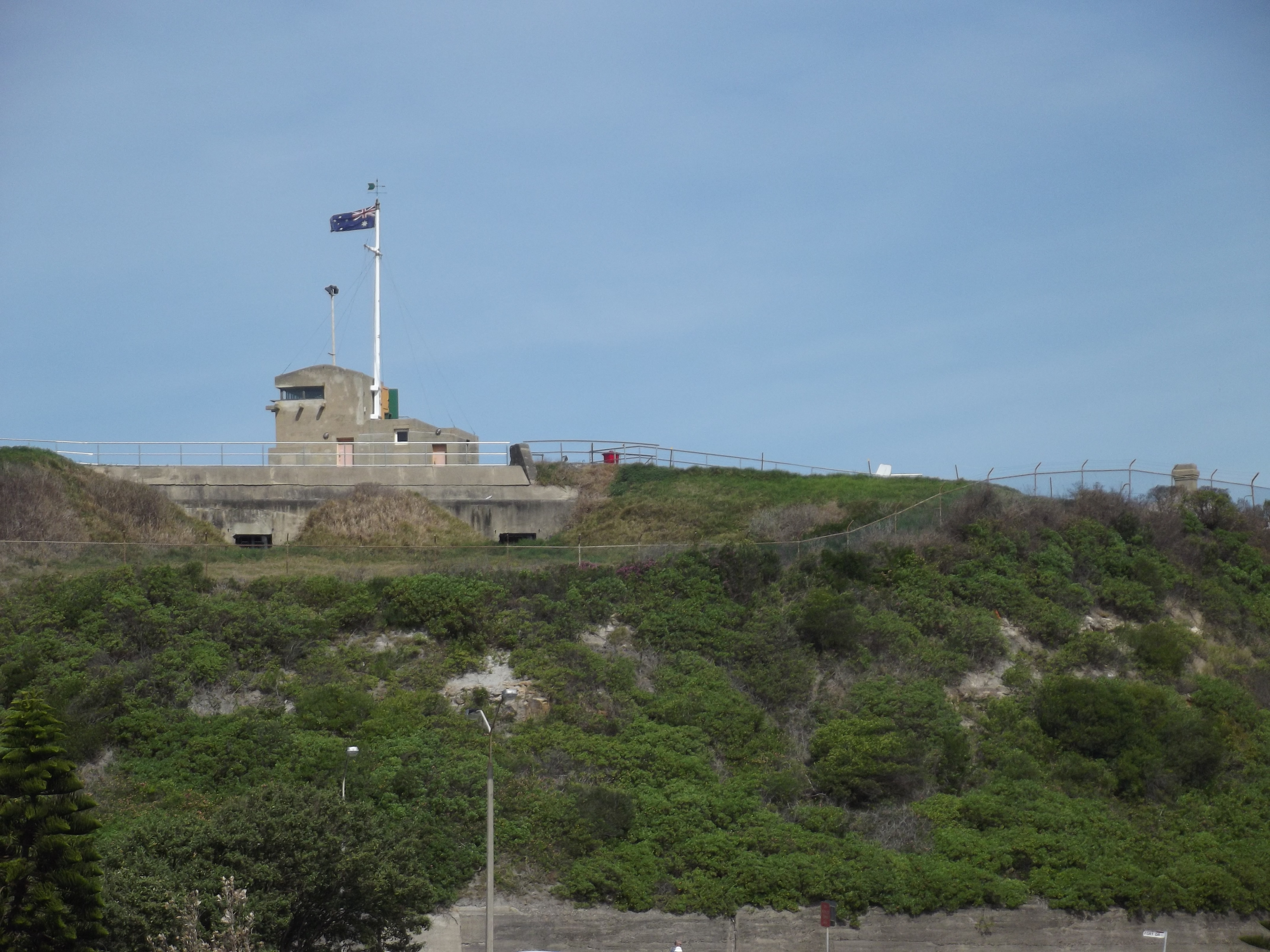
- Fort Scratchley in 2011.

Site information
- Type: Coastal defence installation
- Owner: Newcastle City Council
- Controlled by: Australia
- Open to the public: Wednesday - Monday (closed Tuesday) (10am - 4pm)
- Condition: Restored

Location
- Location within New South Wales
- Coordinates: 32.92768°S 151.79045°E
- Height: 30 m (98 ft)

Site history
- Built: 1882
- In use: 1882–1972
- Battles/wars: Shelling of Newcastle 1942

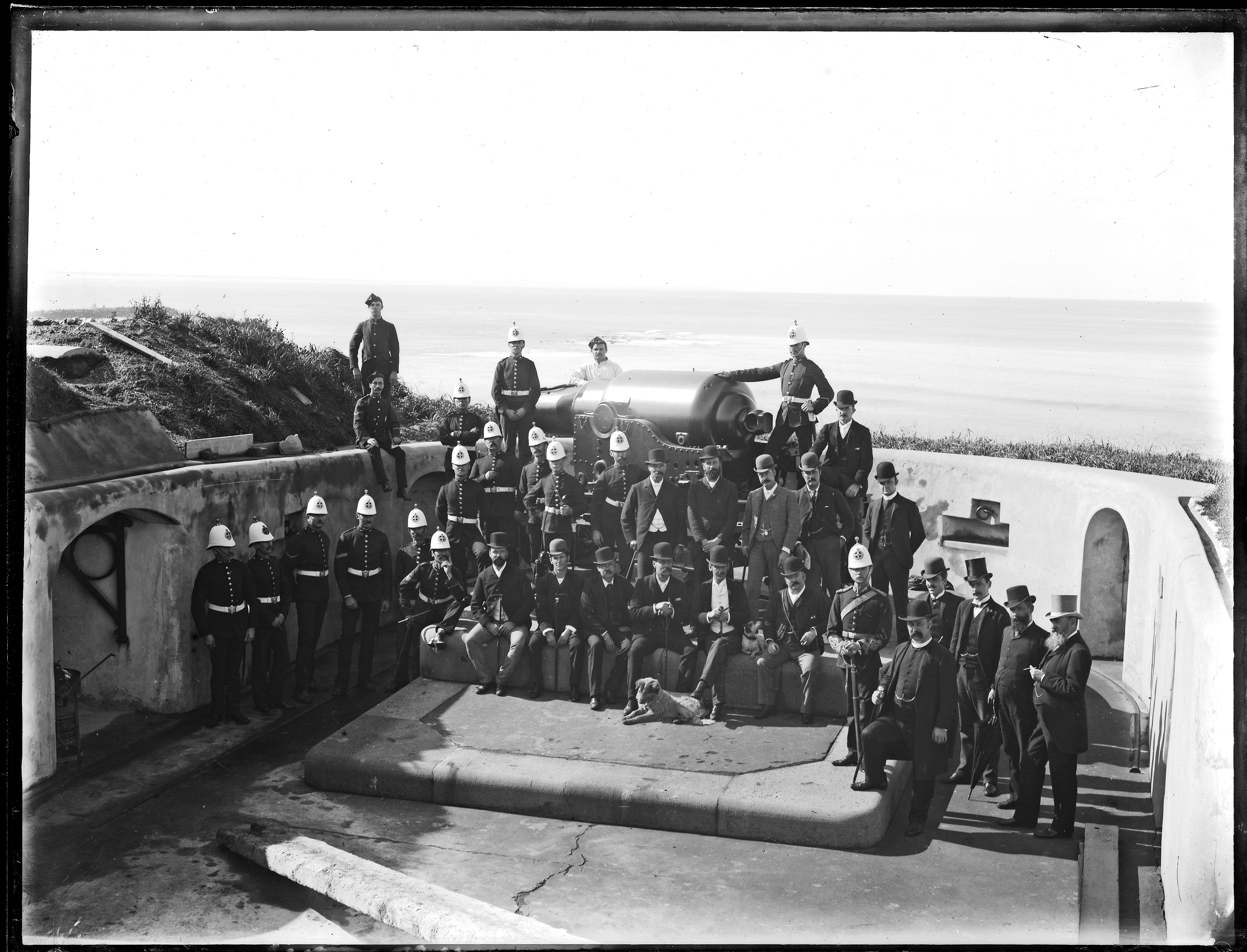
Fort Scratchley, 1890 (photographer Ralph Snowball)

Fort Scratchley, a former coastal defence installation, is now a museum. It is located in Newcastle East, a suburb of Newcastle, New South Wales in Australia. It was built in 1882 to defend the city against a possible Russian attack. However, its guns were not fired in anger until 8 June 1942, during the shelling of Newcastle. The Australian Army left the site in 1972.

== Background ==
Fort Scratchley is situated atop Flagstaff Hill, overlooking the Tasman Sea and the Hunter River, less than 1 km (0.6 mi) from the Newcastle central business district. It is accessed from Nobbys Road, and is directly between Newcastle and Nobbys beaches. Originally built as a coastal defence fort, it is located in a commanding position, guarding the Hunter River estuary.

In 2004 the site was closed for renovation which the city hoped would make the fort a major tourist attraction. Unfortunately, as costs rose due to vandalism and an increase in necessary decontamination to the site, progress stalled. The Australian Government funded the project after reaching an agreement with Newcastle City Council in 2004, and decided to increase its funding from an estimated A$5.5 million to almost $10 million after reaching a second agreement in 2007. The government wanted to ensure that the site was repaired correctly as it sees it as a special place in Australia's military history. The site re-opened in June 2008; a museum on the site was operational by 2009.

== History ==
=== Founding ===
Flagstaff Hill is where coal was discovered in the late 18th century. Lieutenant John Shortland had come upon the land while looking for rogue criminals, but his pursuits were unsuccessful and instead he found fragments of coal at the base of the hill. Flagstaff Hill continued to be the home of coal exportation throughout the early 19th century, until the army claimed the land in 1843. Plans for a complete fort were not made until after 1870, when the threat of an attack by Russia began spreading throughout Newcastle due to the increased hostility between England and Russia. The fort was finally finished in 1882, the Russians were no longer a threat, the Japanese had become the new enemy.

=== Beginnings ===
A battery of two 32 pounder SB cannons were placed upon Allans Hill in 1866, two 68 pounders replaced them in 1874. On 1 April 1878, preparations began for the installation of a battery of four 80 pounder guns upon Allans Hill, it was completed on 19 April.

=== Design ===
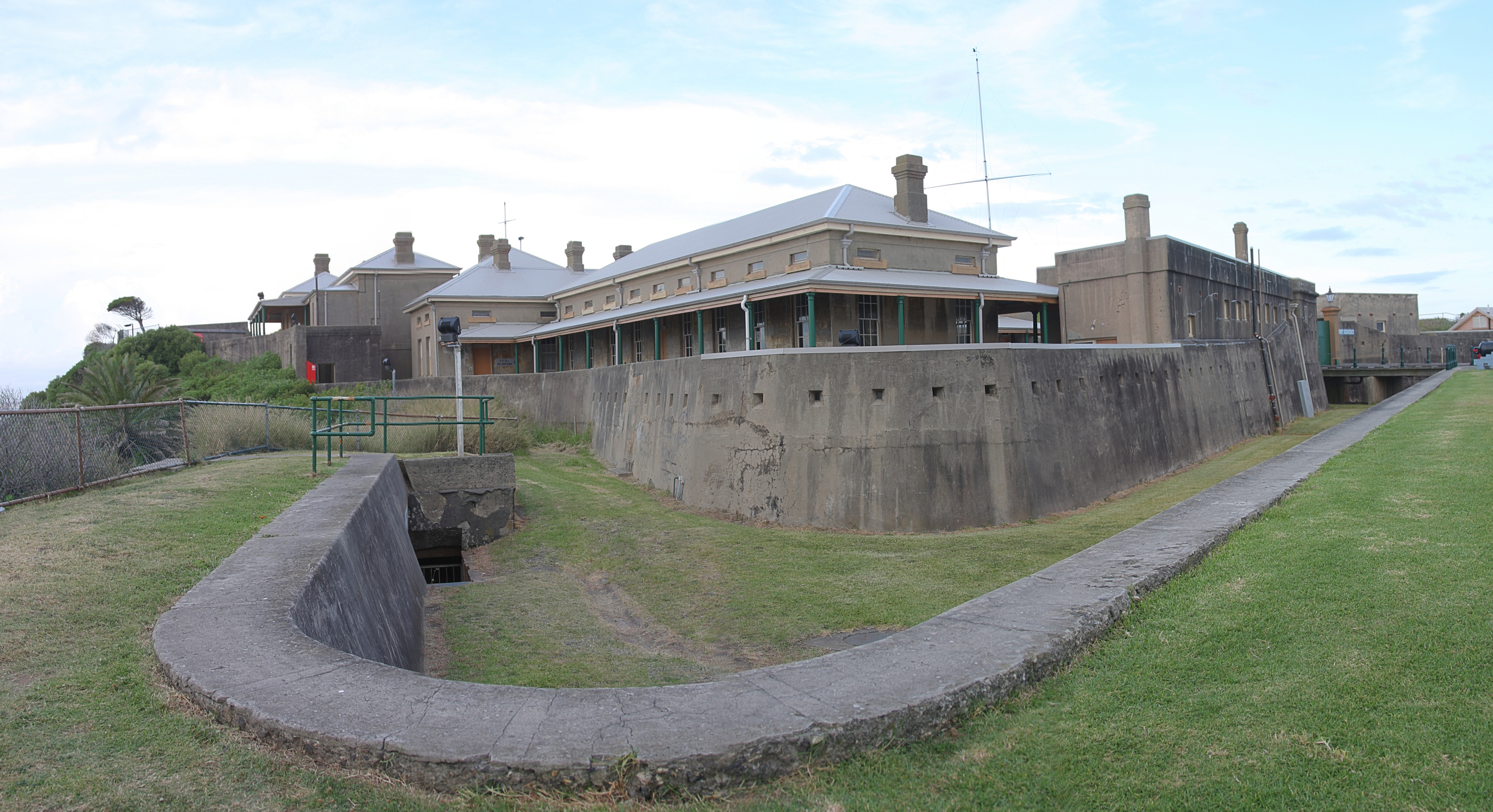
Fort Scratchley, showing the dry moat that surrounds part of the structure

The fort was completed on 2 April 1882. It was designed by Lieutenant-Colonel Peter Scratchley, after whom the fort was named and included three 9-in Rifle Muzzle Loader (RML) guns and a casemated battery of four 80 pounders. In 1889 three 6-inch BL and one 8-in BL disappearing gun were installed.

The 80 pounders were replaced by quick-firing Nordenfelt machine guns in 1898. Two 6-in BL Mark VIIs replaced the four disappearing guns in 1911.

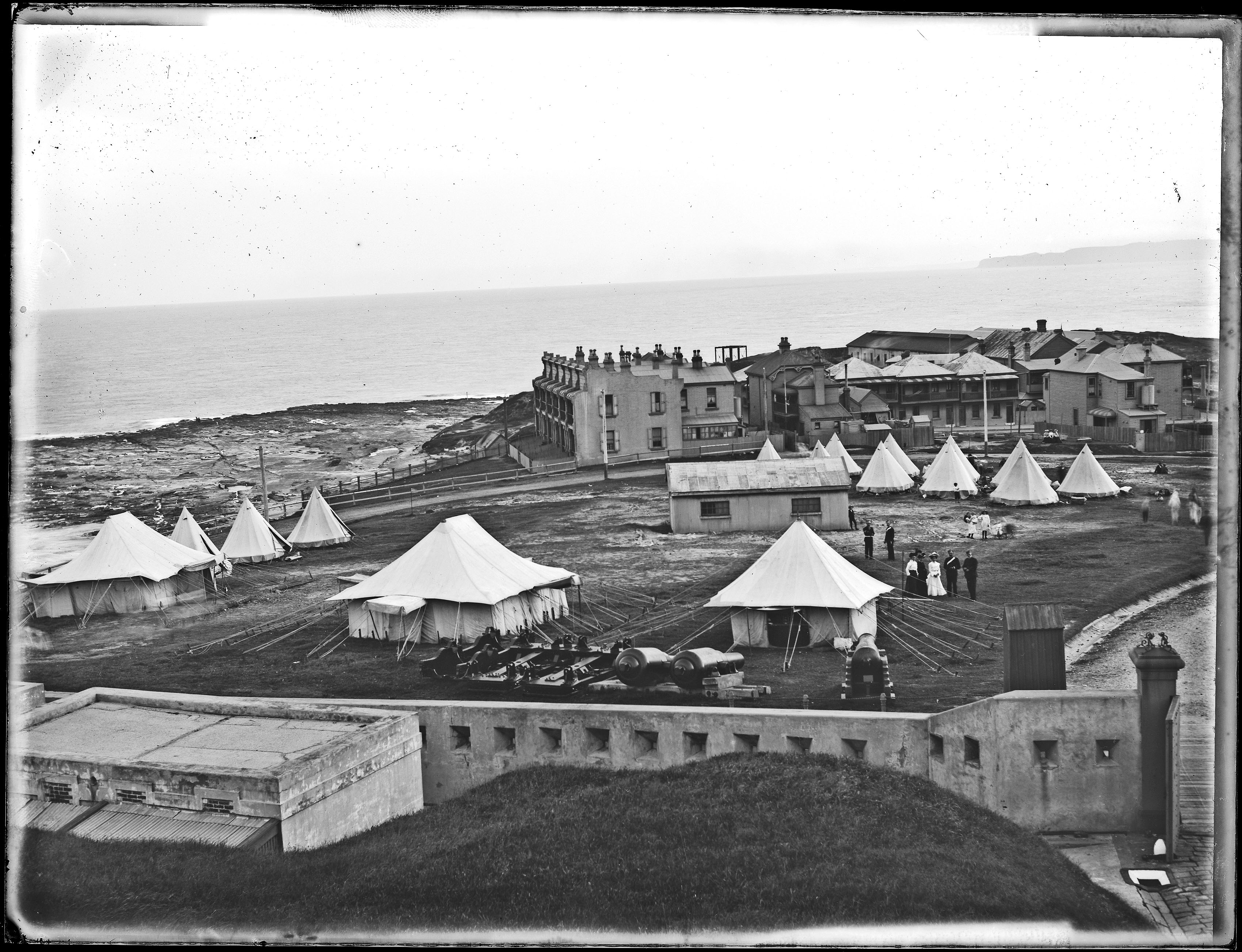
Tents at Fort Scratchley, Newcastle, New South Wales, 4 April 1903

=== World War I ===
During World War I, the fort was upgraded with the provision of a Battery Observation Post constructed in 1914.

=== World War II ===
During World War II, the fort was further upgraded with the extension of the Battery Observation Post and provision of Searchlight Directing Station and blast walls were constructed in 1942. The two 6-in BL Mark VII guns fired at the Japanese submarine I-21, which shelled the city on 8 June 1942.

=== Post World War II ===
After World War II the fort was home to 13 Medium Coast Battery RAA, a unit of the National Service Scheme, which was renamed 113 Coast Battery RAA in the 1960s. The army left the site in November 1972.

The 6-in guns were relocated to King Edward Park, 1.3 km (0.8 mi) away, as a memorial. However, after extensive lobbying, they were returned to Fort Scratchley in 1978.

In the first decade of the 21st century the site underwent a multimillion-dollar renovation and reopened as a museum.

In 2014, History show TV presenter Sir Tony Robinson visited the Fort to produce a segment for his show Tour of Duty which was aired in 2015.

In 2015, the Fort's sole Nordenfelt gun was restored to fully functional condition and is fired on special occasions from its position in the underground casemate.

== Cannon disposals ==
Two 68-pounder cannons are now located at Stroud, New South Wales. An 8-in disappearing gun was sent to North Head Artillery School for training purposes. A Signal cannon was relocated to Georges Heights, Sydney, then relocated to Puckapunyal, Army Barracks in Victoria.

The two Mk VII guns were decommissioned in 1965 and relocated to Obelisk Hill as monuments. They were returned to the Fort in 1978 and placed in their original positions. Both were restored by the Fort Scratchley Historical Society in 1992 and are capable of being fired on special occasions for ceremonial and saluting purposes.

One of the QF 1.5 inch Nordenfelt guns was removed in 1910 and the other two in the 1930s; all were sent to Sydney. One was returned to the Fort in 1985. It was restored in 2015 and is capable of being fired on special occasions.

== Engineering heritage ==
Fort Scratchley received an Engineering Heritage Marker from Engineers Australia as part of its Engineering Heritage Recognition Program.

== See also ==
- Australia–Russia relations
