= Alexander John Arbuthnot =

British official & writer (1822–1907)

Sir Alexander John Arbuthnot KCSI CIE
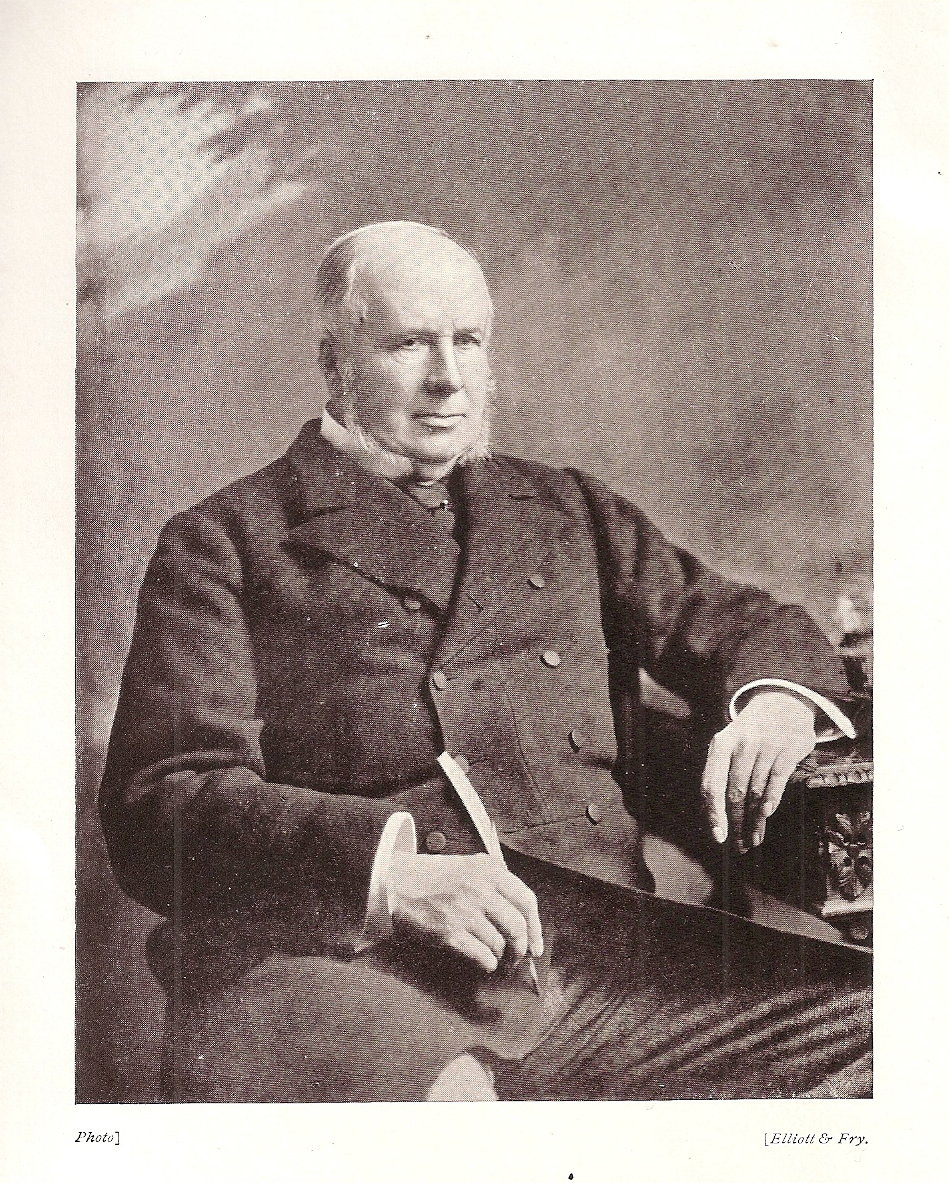
- Sir Alexander John Arbuthnot KCSI
- Born: 11 October 1822; Killaloe, County Clare, Ireland
- Died: 10 June 1907 (aged 84)
- Occupations: British official and writer
- Spouses: Frederica Eliza Fearon, (Constance) Angelena Milman
- Relatives: Son of Alexander Arbuthnot; nephew of Charles Arbuthnot and General Sir Thomas Arbuthnot and General Sir Robert Arbuthnot; brother of General Sir Charles George Arbuthnot and half brother of Major-General George Bingham Arbuthnot

Signature
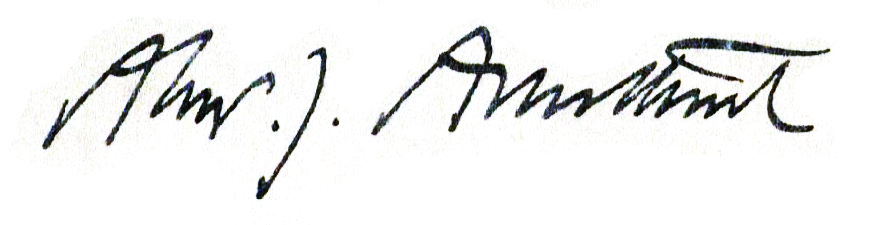

Sir Alexander John Arbuthnot KCSI CIE (11 October 1822 – 10 June 1907) was a British official and writer.

== Early life ==
He was born at Farmhill, County Mayo, the third son of Alexander Arbuthnot and his second wife Margaret Phoebe Bingham, daughter of George Bingham. Charles George Arbuthnot was his brother and Major-General George Bingham Arbuthnot a half-brother. He was uncle of Brigadier-general Alexander George Arbuthnot.

Arbuthnot was educated at Rugby School.

== Career ==
Arbuthnot served in Madras (now Chennai) as the director of Public Instruction (1855); he was a key force in the incorporation of Madras University (1857) where he served as the Vice Chancellor from 1871 to 1872; he was the chief secretary to the Madras Government (1862–67); he was a member of the Legislative Council (1867–72); he was a member of the Madras Executive Council; he served on the Viceroy's Executive Council (1875–80); he was acting Governor of Madras, India, for about three months, from 19 February 1872 to 15 May 1872. He later served as a member of the Council of the Secretary of State for India from 1888 to 1893.

Arbuthnot was honoured by the Crown with the titles of Knight Commander of The Most Exalted Order of the Star of India (1873) and Companion of The Most Eminent Order of the Indian Empire (CIE).

== Later life ==
In 1880 Arbuthnot returned to England, his term on the Executive Council having come to an end. He settled at Newtown House, near Newbury. He lived there from 1881. The property, owned to 1879 by Edmund Arbuthnot, then came to him through a family connection, on the death in 1889 of William Chatteris of Sandleford Priory, whose first wife Anne was Arbuthnot's sister.

Arbuthnot contributed to the Dictionary of National Biography from its inception in 1885. He was a noted amateur rose grower.

== Family ==
Arbuthnot married, firstly, Frederica Eliza Fearon (died 1898), daughter of Robert Bryce Fearon (died 1851) of the 40th Foot. They had no children. His second wife, married in 1899, was Constance Angelena Milman (died 1936), daughter of Sir William Milman, 3rd Baronet. She was a novelist.

== Publications ==
- Select reports of criminal cases determined in the Court of Foujdaree Udalat of Madras (1851)
- Papers Relating to Public Instruction in the Madras Presidency (1855)
- Sir Thomas Munro, bart., governor of Madras: selections of his minutes and other official writings (1881)
- Lord Clive; the foundation of British rule in India (1899), with Henry Francis Wilson, Builders of Greater Britain series
- Memories of Rugby & India (1910), with Constance Arbuthnot
