= Alexander Arbuthnot (bishop) =

Irish Anglican bishop (1768–1828)

Rt Rev Alexander Arbuthnot
- Born: 7 May 1768; Rockfleet Castle, County Mayo
- Died: 9 January 1828 (aged 59); Killaloe, County Clare
- Occupation: Bishop of Killaloe and Kilfenora
- Term: 1823–1828
- Predecessor: Richard Mant
- Successor: Hon. Richard Ponsonby
- Spouses: Susanna Bingham, Margaret Phoebe Bingham
- Children: (1) Major-General (hon.) George Bingham Arbuthnot, (2) Sir Alexander John Arbuthnot, KCSI and (3) General Sir Charles George Arbuthnot
- Relatives: Son of John Arbuthnot of Rockfleet; Brother of Charles Arbuthnot and General Sir Thomas Arbuthnot and General Sir Robert Arbuthnot

Alexander Arbuthnot (7 May 1768 – 9 January 1828) was the Anglican Bishop of Killaloe and Kilfenora in the then-established Anglican Church of Ireland.

He was born in Rockfleet Castle, County Mayo, Ireland, the son of John Arbuthnot of Rockfleet. Among his siblings were the Right Honourable Charles Arbuthnot and General Sir Thomas Arbuthnot.

Arbuthnot was ordained a priest at Limerick on 2 November 1794, made vicar of Annaghdown and Killascobe in 1801 and rector of Crossboyne and Kilcoleman in 1808. He served as Archdeacon of Aghadoe (1809–1816) and Dean of Cloyne (1816–1823), before being elevated to the episcopy as Bishop of Killaloe and Kilfenora (1823–1828).

He died in Killaloe in County Clare and is buried in the church-yard of his cathedral there. Alexander had married twice: first, on 31 March 1798, Susanna Bingham, daughter of General George Bingham (uncle of Charles Bingham, 1st Earl of Lucan) of Antigua/Lisnageeha (Irish: Lios na Gaoithe), just outside Castlebar, County Mayo; and secondly (in a service performed by the Archbishop of Tuam at St. Peter's Church, Aungier Street, Dublin), on 5 May 1819, Margaret Phoebe Bingham, daughter of Mr Bingham (Alexander's first wife's uncle). Among his children were Major-General (hon.) George Bingham Arbuthnot (who had issue including Major-General George Alexander Arbuthnot), Sir Alexander John Arbuthnot and General Sir Charles George Arbuthnot.
