= Charles Crombie =

Australian World War II flying ace

Charles Arbuthnot Crombie
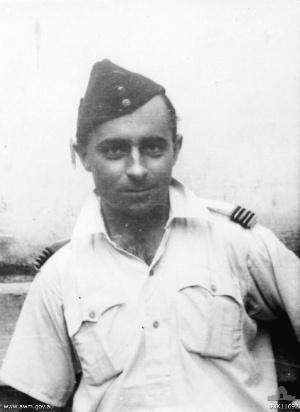
- Flight Lieutenant Charles Crombie c.1943
- Born: 16 March 1914; Brisbane, Queensland
- Died: 26 August 1945 (aged 31); Williamtown, New South Wales
- Burial place: Sandgate War Cemetery
- Relatives: Lieutenant General Sir Charles Arbuthnot (grandfather)
- Military career
- Allegiance: Australia
- Branch: Citizens Military Force; Royal Australian Air Force
- Service years: 1934–1938; 1940–1945
- Rank: Squadron Leader
- Conflicts: Second World War; European theatre; Mediterranean theatre; Siege of Malta; South-East Asian theatre
- Awards: Distinguished Service Order; Distinguished Flying Cross

Charles Arbuthnot Crombie, DSO, DFC (16 March 1914 – 26 August 1945) was an Australian aviator and flying ace of the Second World War. Born in Brisbane, he was working as a jackeroo when he enlisted in the Royal Australian Air Force in May 1940. Completing flight training in Australia and Canada, he flew in the European, Mediterranean and Middle East Theatre and South-East Asian theatres, amassing a tally of 12 Axis aircraft shot down, with an additional four probables. In a particular attack on 19 January 1943, Crombie intercepted a formation of four Japanese bombers over India. Despite his aircraft being set alight early in the engagement, he shot down two of the bombers and severely damaged a third before he was forced to bail out. He was awarded the Distinguished Service Order for this action. Returning to Australia late in 1943, he was promoted to squadron leader and posted as a flight instructor with No. 5 Operational Training Unit. Crombie was killed in a flying accident in August 1945.

== Early life ==
Crombie was born in Brisbane, Queensland, on 16 March 1914 to David William Alexander Crombie, a grazing farmer, and his Indian-born British wife Phoebe Janet (née Arbuthnot), the daughter of Lieutenant General Sir Charles Arbuthnot. During his youth, Crombie was educated at the Sydney Church of England Grammar School in North Sydney. Completing his schooling, he was employed as a jackeroo on his family's property near Warwick, Queensland. In 1934, Crombie enlisted in the Citizens Military Force and was allotted to the 11th Light Horse Regiment. His service with the unit was to last until 1938, by which time he had obtained the rank of sergeant.

== Second World War ==
=== Training, European and Middle Eastern theatres ===
With the ambition of becoming a pilot in the Royal Australian Air Force, Crombie undertook instruction in civil flying. Completing his course, he enlisted in the Air Force on 24 May 1940. He was initially posted to RAAF Station Richmond, before transferring to No. 2 Initial Training School at RAAF Bradfield Park in June, where he was advanced to leading aircraftman. The following month, Crombie was attached to No. 5 Empire Flight Training School. On finishing his stint with the unit, he was posted to No. 2 Embarkion Depot on 18 September. In a ceremony two days later, Crombie married Betty Deane-Butcher; the couple would later have a son.

On 3 October 1940—two weeks after his wedding—Crombie embarked on a ship in Sydney, bound for Canada. He arrived three weeks later, where he completed an additional two months of advanced flight training. Crombie was commissioned as a pilot officer on 17 January 1941 and set sail for the United Kingdom nine days later. In May, he was attached to the Royal Air Force's No. 25 Squadron, piloting Bristol Beaufighters. While with the unit, he flew his first operational sortie on 13 June; he was promoted to flying officer the next month. Crombie continued to serve with the squadron until October, by which time he had flown a total of twelve operational sorties over the European theatre, including two raids; one over Germany, and the other to Brest, France.

Crombie was transferred to the Mediterranean and Middle East Theatre and posted to No. 89 Squadron RAF in October 1941, operating over Egypt and Malta. Also flying Beaufighters, Crombie piloted his first foray with the unit on 21 October, and by the end of the year had been accredited with the destruction of six Axis aircraft, with an additional two probables. Throughout 1942, the squadron continued to operate over North Africa and the Middle East, with Crombie adding three more aircraft to his tally.

=== South-East Asia ===
In January 1943, Crombie was once again transferred, this time to No. 176 Squadron RAF stationed in India, operating in support of operations in the Burma Campaign; he arrived at his new post on 12 January and was promoted to flight lieutenant five days later. By the time he left the Middle East, Crombie had been accorded an official tally of nine Axis aircraft shot down, with two probables.

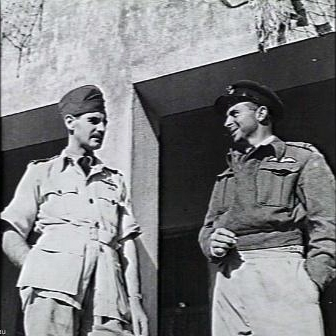
Wing Commander J. O'Neill congratulates Crombie on his success in destroying two Japanese bombers and damaging a third in one action over India.

In the evening of 19 January 1943, Crombie was airborne over India with his navigator Warrant Officer Raymond Moss. At approximately 20:45, the pair intercepted a formation of four Japanese bombers flying over Budge Budge. Crombie flew his aircraft towards the group but his initial attack drew fire from the bombers, setting the starboard engine ablaze. Despite the damage, he pushed ahead with the assault and shot down one of the bombers. Flames from the burning engine then began to sweep back, and Crombie ordered Moss to bail out. Alone, Crombie continued the assault, shooting down a second bomber, before turning his attention to a third. Due to his efforts, the penultimate aircraft was "so badly damaged ... that it could not have reached its base". At this time, Crombie sought out the fourth and final machine. However, his petrol tank exploded, and he was forced "to bale out with his clothing alight". He landed in "the most God awful swamp", and walked for three or four hours before he reached an army unit in the area, which returned him to his squadron.

As a result of their "cool courage", Crombie was awarded a "well deserved" Distinguished Service Order, with Moss receiving the Distinguished Flying Cross. The notification and accompanying citation for the decorations was promulgated in a supplement to the London Gazette on 19 February 1943, reading:

Air Ministry, 19th February, 1943.

ROYAL AIR FORCE.

The KING has been graciously pleased to approve the following awards in recognition of gallantry displayed in flying operations against the enemy: —

Distinguished Service Order.

Flying Officer Charles Arbuthnot CROMBIE (Aus.404099), Royal Australian Air Force, No. 176 Squadron.

Distinguished Flying Cross.

Warrant Officer Raymond Christopher Moss (800670), No. 176 Squadron.

As pilot and observer respectively Flying Officer Crombie and Warrant Officer Moss have flown together in many night flying operations in the United Kingdom, the Middle East and in India. They have destroyed 8 enemy aircraft and damaged another. One night in January, 1943, they destroyed 2 of a formation of 4 Japanese aircraft before being compelled to abandon their own aircraft which was set on fire during the engagement.

Flying Officer Crombie and Warrant Officer Moss have displayed great courage, determination and devotion to duty.

Crombie completed his final patrol with No. 176 Squadron on 28 April 1943, before moving to Air Headquarters, Bengal four days later. Later that month, Crombie carried out two raids over Akyab, Burma, the first a strafing attack on Japanese troops in the area, and the second assaulting Japanese shipping. On 25 May, the announcement that Crombie had been awarded the Distinguished Flying Cross was published in a supplement to the London Gazette. The decoration came as a result of his "High standard of courage and keenness whilst flying" with No. 89 Squadron in the Middle East, carrying out "... Intruder patrols and ... low level attacks on enemy bases" in addition to his personal destruction of Axis aircraft.

Crombie piloted his final sortie of the war from Air Headquarters, Bengal on 7 July 1943. His operational tour now finished, he embarked for Australia in August, arriving in Melbourne on 27 September. By the time Crombie's tour completed, he had been accorded an official tally of 12 aircraft shot down, with an additional accreditation of four probables.

=== Home duties and death ===
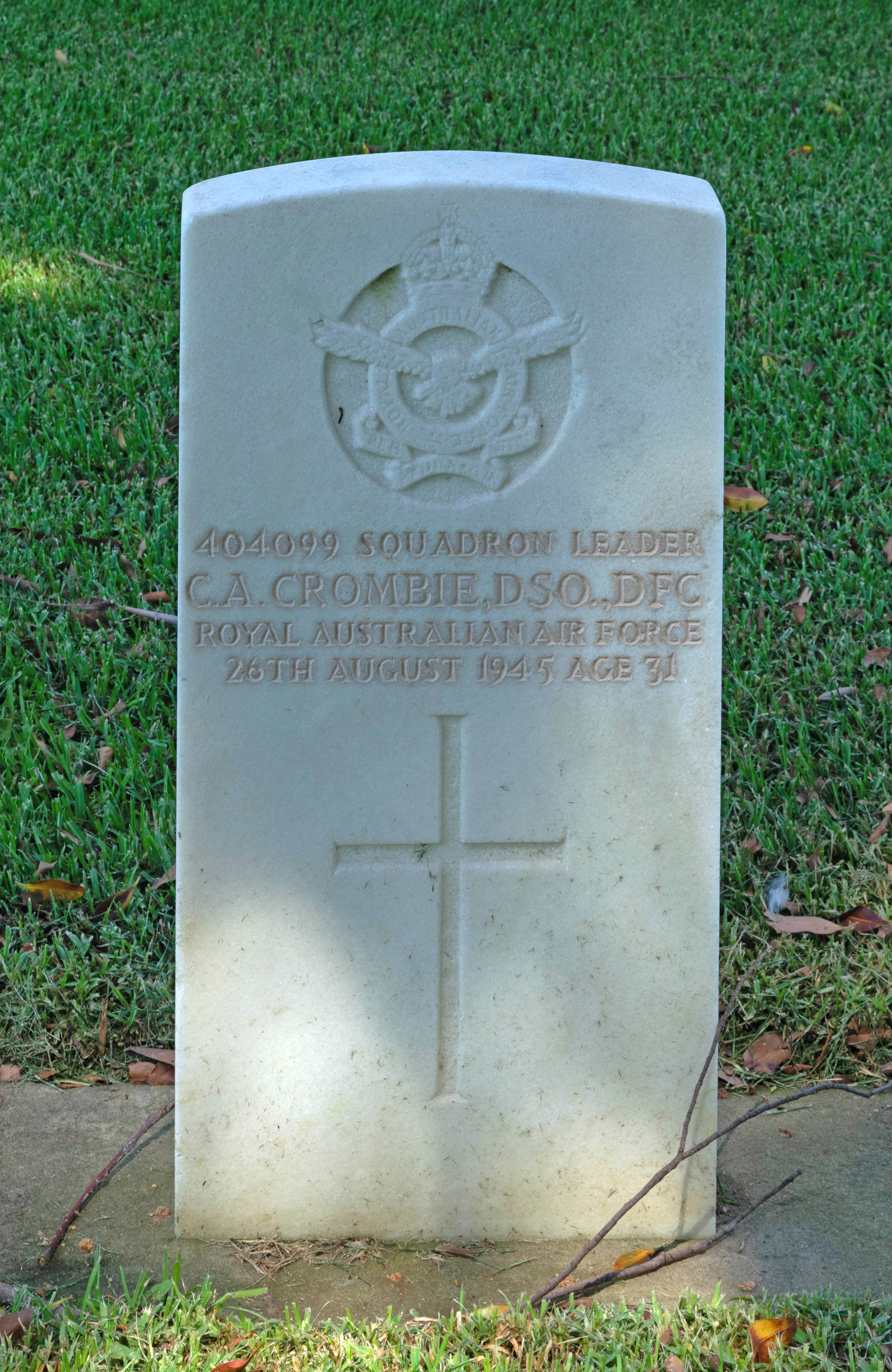
Charles Crombie's grave in Sandgate War Cemetery.

On his return to Australia, Crombie was posted for duties as an instructor with No. 5 Operational Training Unit at RAAF Station Williamtown in December 1943. In March 1944, Crombie piloted a Beaufighter from Brisbane to New Guinea, flying the aircraft in the local area for a period of eleven days testing the machine, before returning to Richmond, New South Wales. He was promoted to acting squadron leader on 1 September, and made chief flying instructor of No. 5 Operational Training Unit, heading the group's two sections of Beaufighter and de Havilland Mosquito aircraft.

On 8 May 1945, to celebrate Victory in Europe Day, 12 aircraft from No. 5 Operational Training Unit were detailed to do a flypast over Newcastle, New South Wales. Crombie headed the group, which comprised six Beaufighters followed by six Mosquitoes; the final aircraft in the group was piloted by Flight Lieutenant Charles "Bud" Tingwell. The flypast concluded successfully, and the formation returned to base. However, as the group neared the aerodrome, the other pilots disobeyed Crombie's orders and carried out a feint attack on the installation. He called the men into his office and reprimanded them as a result.

On 26 August 1945, Crombie was flying a Beaufighter on a test flight. He completed the flight and returned to base. Coming in to land, a problem occurred in one of the engines and he fell short of the runway; Crombie was killed in the resulting collision. Survived by his wife and one-year-old son, his funeral was attended by all the personnel of No. 5 Operational Training Unit. He was subsequently buried in Sandgate War Cemetery. Fellow No. 5 Operational Training Unit instructor Bud Tingwell later described him as "one of the best pilots in the air force".
