= Sandgate Cemetery =

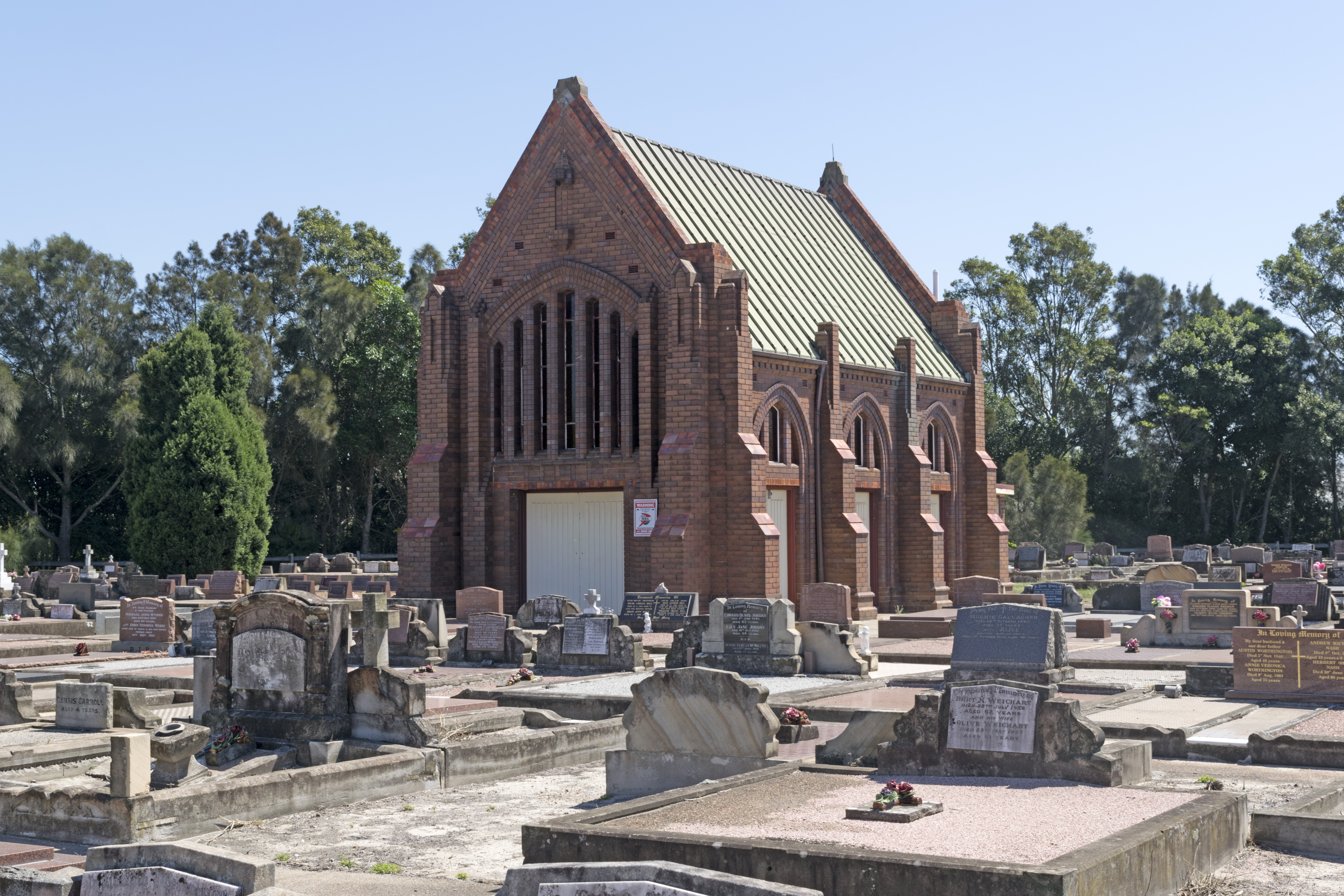
- Catholic Chapel within the cemetery grounds
- Interactive map of Sandgate Cemetery

Details
- Established: 1881; 145 years ago
- Location: 116 Maitland Road, Sandgate, New South Wales
- Country: Australia
- Coordinates: 32°52′08″S 151°42′22″E
- Type: Public
- Owned by: Government of New South Wales
- Size: 40 acres (160,000 m^{2})
- No. of graves: 85,000+
- Website: Sandgate Cemetery
- Find a Grave: Sandgate Cemetery

Sandgate Cemetery is a necropolis in Sandgate, Australia, and has been continuously operating since 1881. The cemetery caters for all religious, ethnic and cultural requirements.

== History ==
Sandgate Cemetery was opened in 1881 and has serviced the burial needs of Newcastle since that time. It is situated on crown land within the suburb of Sandgate, New South Wales. The cemetery is managed by a not for profit community organisation, Northern Cemeteries, through a Board of Trustees.

To service the new cemetery, a special Mortuary station was built in Newcastle. Special trams conveyed funerals from the suburbs to the Mortuary station then onward to a purpose built platform within the cemetery. Modern upgrades and changes continue to be made to this working cemetery. From January 1881 until October 1985, a one kilometre railway line that branched off the Main Northern railway line existed. It was latterly served by two Sunday only services from Newcastle. The line was closed at the request of trust to make way for additional burial plots.

== Notable interments ==
The cemetery has over 85,000 interments. Notably among these include:

- William Brennan, politician
- Stanley Carpenter DCM, footballer and soldier
- Matthew Charlton, Leader of the Federal Opposition
- Hugh Connell, soldier and politician
- Peter Connolly, politician
- Charles Crombie DSO, WWII pilot
- Alfred Goninan, founder of A Goninan & Co
- Frank Hawkins, politician
- Elizabeth Jessie Hickman, bushranger & cattle rustler
- Herb Narvo, footballer & boxer
- Frank Purdue, politician
- John Christian Reid, Mayor of Newcastle
- Dave Sands (David Ritchie), Aboriginal Australian boxer
- Arthur Selwyn, 1st Dean of Newcastle
- James Smith, politician
- Ralph Snowball, early photographer
- Jack Stretch, Anglican Bishop of Newcastle
- Pat Walsh, rugby league and rugby union footballer
- David Watkins, politician
- Margaret White, of the Awabakal people

== Gallery ==
Grave of Matthew Charlton and family.

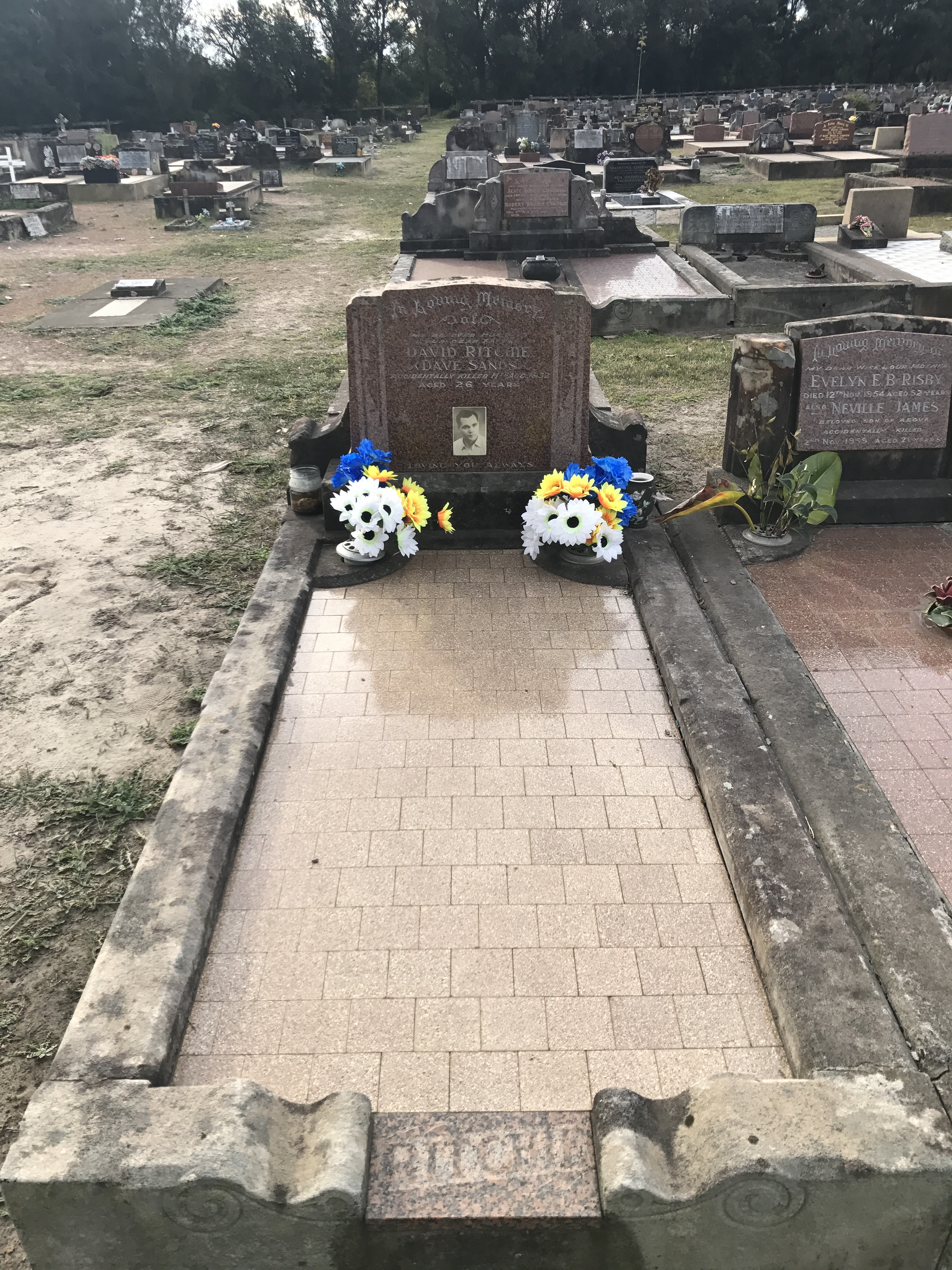
Grave of Dave Sands.

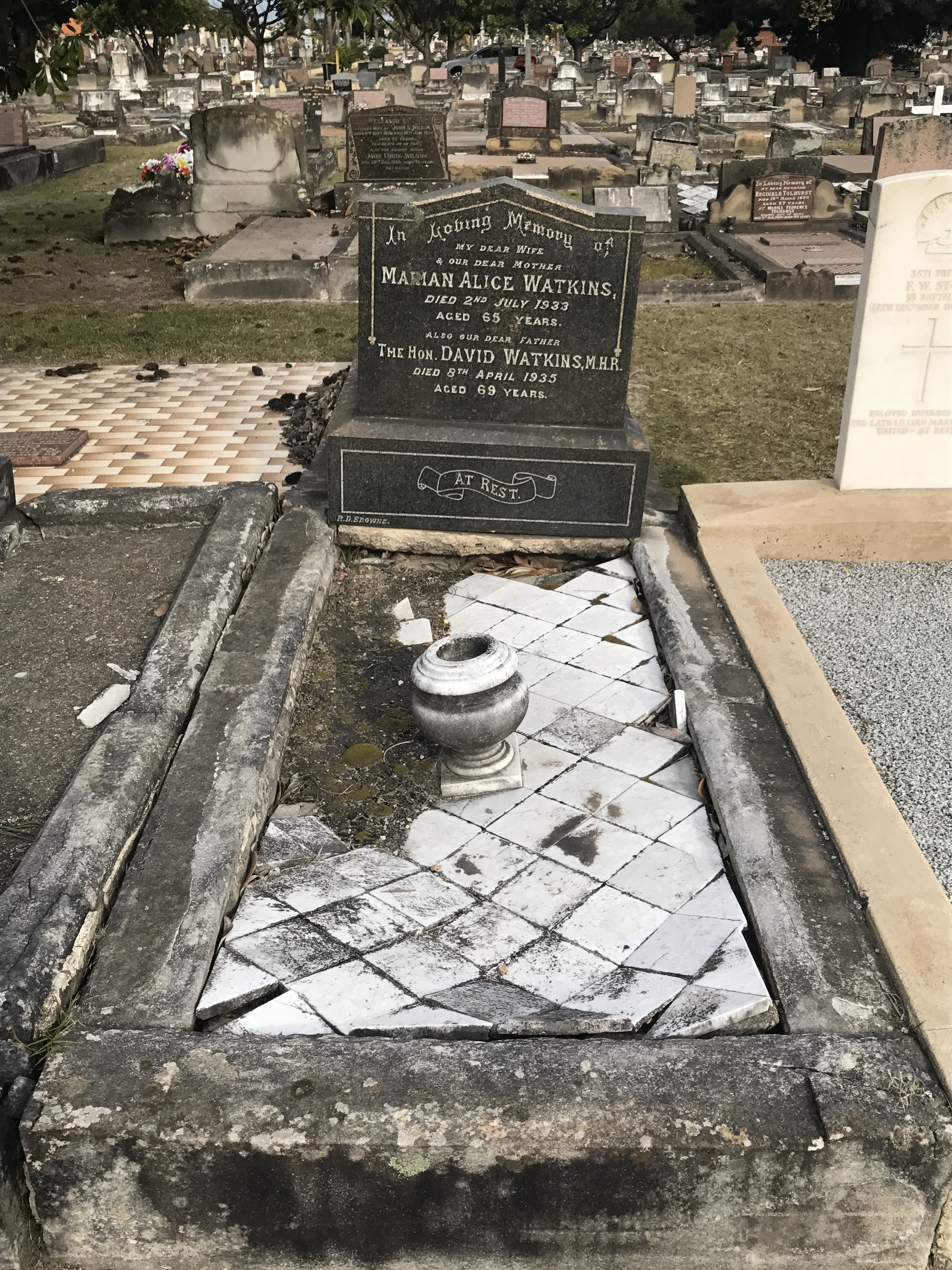
Grave of David Watkins.

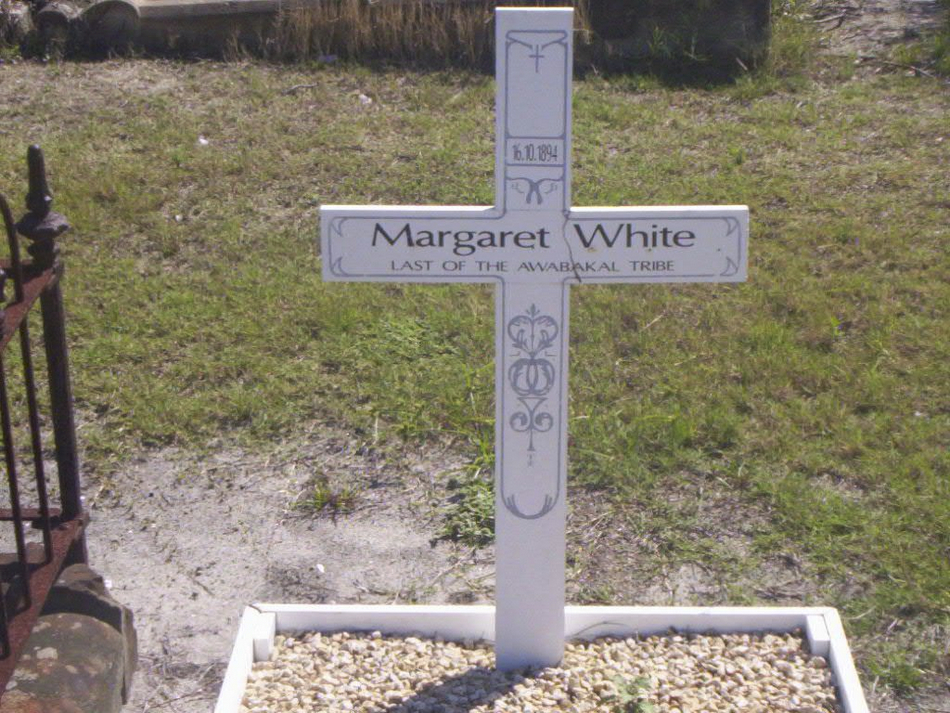
Grave of Margaret White.
