= Shelling of Newcastle =

Japanese attacks against a city in New South Wales, Australia in 1942

- Part of the Pacific War, World War II
| Date | 8 June 1942 |
| Location | Newcastle, New South Wales |
| Result | indecisive |

Belligerents
| Empire of Japan | Australia |

Commanders and leaders
| (Empire of Japan) Matsumura Kanji | |

Strength
| One submarine | Coastal artillery |

Casualties and losses
| None | One injured One house damaged |

The Shelling of Newcastle was conducted by the Japanese submarine I-21 in the early hours of 8 June 1942. The bombardment followed the attack on Sydney Harbour on 31 May, and was conducted shortly after I-24 shelled the Eastern Suburbs of Sydney. During the attack I-21 fired 34 shells at Newcastle, including eight illumination rounds, but caused little damage. The Australian gunners at Fort Scratchley fired four shells at the submarine, but scored no hits.

== Background ==
During 1942 and 1943 Imperial Japanese Navy submarines conducted a number of patrols along Australia's east coast. On 16 May 1942 the submarine I-29 attacked the Soviet freighter Wellen 50 miles (80 km) south-east of Newcastle, but did not cause any damage to the ship. In response, a naval force was dispatched from Sydney to attempt to locate the submarine and ships were not permitted to sail between Newcastle and Sydney for 24 hours. On 23 May I-29's floatplane flew over Newcastle and Sydney searching for shipping which could be attacked by midget submarines.

On the night of 31 May three Japanese midget submarines attacked shipping in Sydney Harbour. The ultimate aim was to sink the United States Navy Heavy Cruiser USS Chicago, although unsuccessful in this objective, the attack did result in the sinking of the accommodation ship HMAS Kuttabul. All three midget submarines were however lost in the attack. Following this raid, the large submarines which had launched the midgets attacked shipping off the east coast; these included two attacks on ships near Newcastle on the night of 3 June. At 10:18 pm the coastal steamer Age was shelled by I-24 35 miles (56 km) south-east of Norah Head; she did not sustain any damage and docked at Newcastle at 1 am the next day. At about midnight on 3 June the coaster Iron Chieftain was torpedoed and sunk by I-24 near where Age had been attacked.

== Bombardment ==
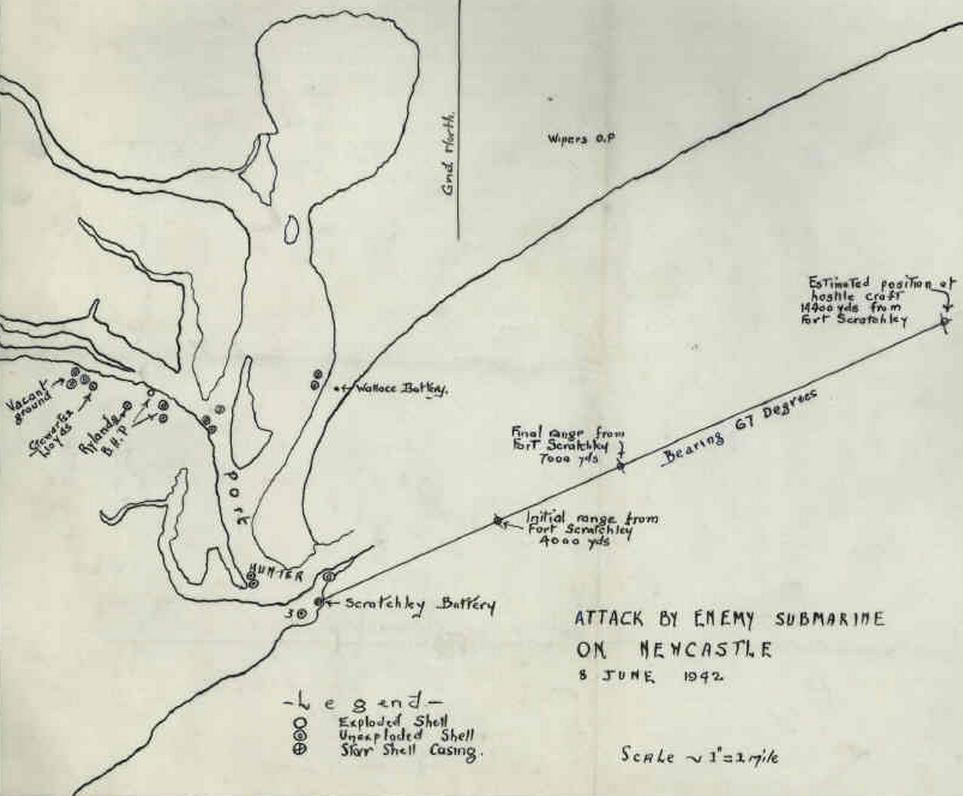
Map depicting I-21's bombardment of Newcastle, including the locations where shells landed

During the early hours of 8 June I-24 and I-21 carried out brief bombardments of Sydney and Newcastle respectively. The purpose of these attacks was to generate what historian David Jenkins has called an "air of disquiet" rather than inflict significant damage on targets in the two cities. Between 00:15 and 00:20 I-24 fired ten shells which landed in the suburbs of Bellevue Hill, Rose Bay and Woollahra. Only one of these shells exploded, and they caused little damage and only injured one person. While the Sydney Harbour defences spotted I-24's gun flashes, the submarine ceased its attack and submerged before the Australian gunners could open fire on it.

I-21 began her bombardment of Newcastle two hours after the attack on Sydney. At this time the submarine was 9 kilometres (5.6 mi) from Newcastle, and was sailing eastwards as her 140 mm (5.5 in) deck gun was stern-mounted. Prior to the attack the submarine's gun crew had prepared 34 rounds of ammunition; these comprised 26 conventional rounds and eight illumination rounds. The target of the attack was the BHP Newcastle Steelworks in the city.

Between 2:15 am and 2:31 am I-21 fired 34 shells at Newcastle. These rounds landed over a wide area, however, and caused little damage. Only one of the 20 conventional shells exploded, causing damage to a house on Parnell Place. Another shell damaged a nearby tram terminus but did not explode. At 2:28 am the guns at Fort Scratchley near the entrance to Newcastle's harbour opened fire on I-21. The submarine's commanding officer, Commander Matsumura Kanji, continued the bombardment for another three minutes as he believed that it would take time for the Australian gunners to locate the submarine. By the time the attack concluded the fort's two guns had fired two salvos each, but none of the four shells struck I-21.

== Aftermath ==
I-21 and I-24 were not attacked by Allied ships during or after their bombardments as no anti-submarine warfare-capable vessels were available in either port. While one person was injured by falling masonry and debris in Sydney, there were no casualties in Newcastle. Although the bombardments caused little damage, they were successful in generating concern among Australians.
