= John Arbuthnot (agriculturist) =

British agriculturist

John Arbuthnot FRS (c.1729 – 27 December 1797) was a British agriculturist, the Inspector General of the Irish Linen Board.

== Career ==
John Arbuthnot Esq., of Mitcham, was appointed a Fellow of the Royal Society in 1770. His appointment stated that he was thus: "versed in natural knowledge, & having made several considerable improvements in Husbandry, being desirous of becoming a fellow of the Royal Society, is recom[m]ended by us on our personal knowledge of him, as being likely to become a usefull & valuable member"

On agriculture, Arbuthnot authored a work entitled An inquiry into the connection between the present price of provisions, and the size of farms. : With remarks on population as affected thereby. To which are added, proposals for preventing future scarcity. By a farmer. (London: : Printed for T. Cadell ..., 1773)

== Personal life ==
He was son of George Arbuthnot of Kinghornie (baptized 15 February 1688, d. China 18 July 1732). His father was originally a captain in Queen Anne's Guard, entered the East India Company service, and later became a wine merchant in France. John Arbuthnot's mother was Margaret Robinson (d. 1729), the daughter of Thomas Robinson, a portrait painter, and she was half-sister of Anastasia Robinson.

Arbuthnot was married on five occasions. Firstly, in 1753–1759, to Sally Margaret Cecil until she died (buried 19 February 1759), the daughter of John Cecil of Ravensbury (buried 21 April 1760). He then married for a second time, in 1760–1761, to Ursula Fitzgerald until she suddenly died (buried 12 March 1761), however, the couple did have one son, John Arbuthnot Jr (b.1761).

His third wife, whom he married on 19 October 1762 and to whom he remained married until 1782, was Anne Stone (b. 26 September 1739; d. Calais, 15 November 1782), the only daughter of Richard Stone, a London banker with Grasshopper banking house, and also niece of Archbishop George Stone (1708–1764) of Armagh, the Primate of Ireland, son of Andrew Stone. Anne Stone's brother was Andrew Stone (1703–1773), under secretary of state 1748.

The couple had ten children:

1. Anne Arbuthnot (1763–1802) who married and had nine children;
2. George Arbuthnot (1764–1805) who married and had two daughters;
3. Sarah Arbuthnot (1765–1852) who married but had no children;
4. Charles Arbuthnot (1767–1850) who married and had four children;
5. Bishop Alexander Arbuthnot (1768–1828) who married and had eight children;
6. Margaret Arbuthnot (1769–1853) who married but had no children; (
7. Harriet Arbuthnot (1770–?) who married and had four children;
8. Frances Arbuthnot (1772–1811) who married but had no children;
9. General Sir Thomas Arbuthnot (1776–1849), unmarried;, and
10. General Sir Robert Arbuthnot (1773–1853), twice married, who had two children.

On 10 June 1789, Arbuthnot married his fourth wife, being her second husband, Helen O'Halloran Fitzgerald (?): they had no children. In 1791, he then married his fifth wife, Anne Elizabeth Heard (?), and they too had no children.
