= Bingham Arbuthnot =

East India Company army officer (1803–1867)

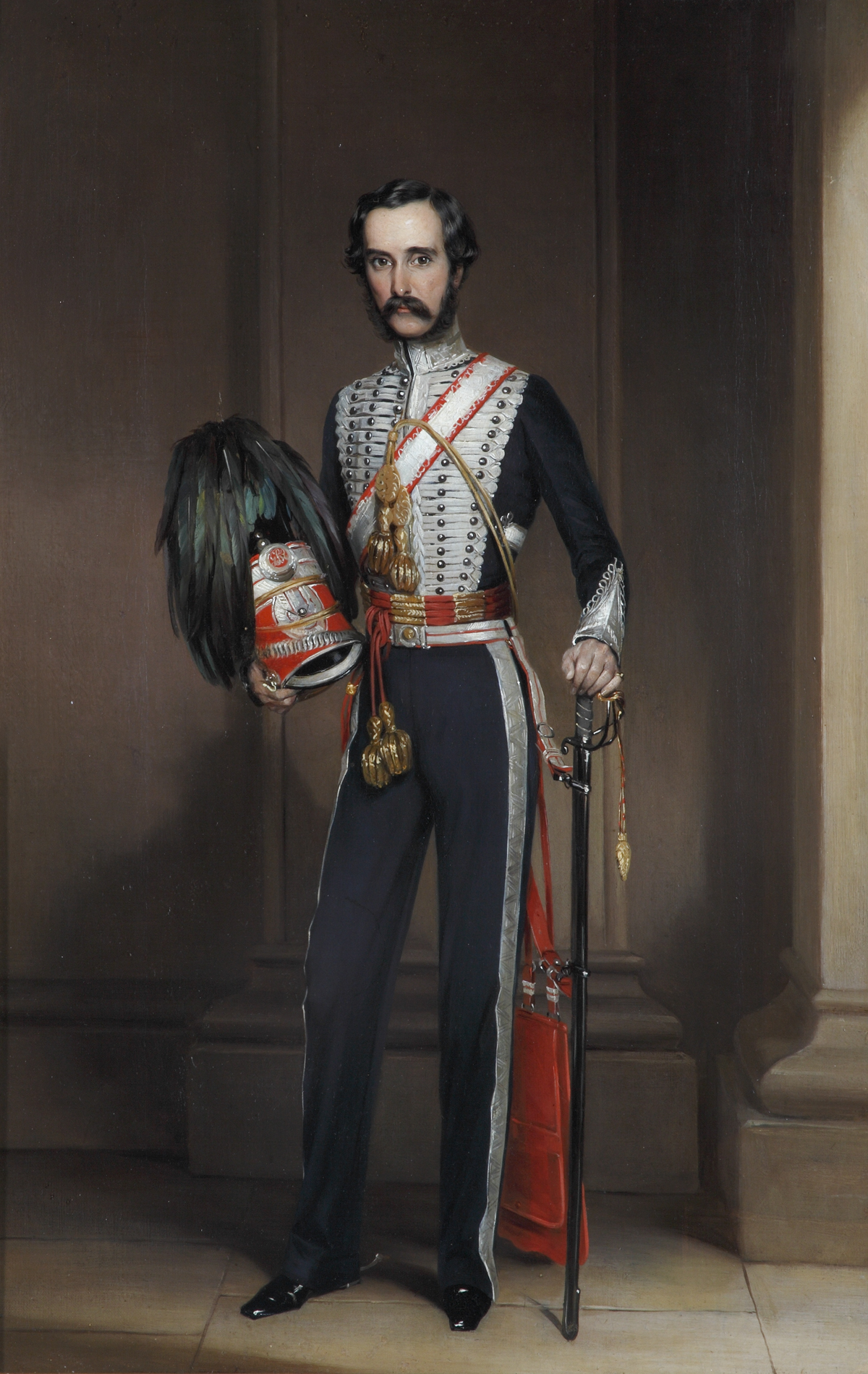
- Arbuthnot c. 1848
- Born: 1803
- Died: 1867 (aged 63–64); Bath, Somerset, England
- Relatives: Alexander Arbuthnot (father)
- Military career
- Allegiance: British
- Rank: Major-General
- Commands: 3rd Madras Cavalry

George Bingham Arbuthnot (2 December 1803 – 30 May 1867) was a Major-General in the Honourable East India Company.

Bingham was commissioned as a cornet in the 3rd Madras Light Cavalry in 1821, having previously served in the Royal Navy. he commanded the Governor General's Bodyguard, Madras, from 1841 to 1853 and as a lieutenant-colonel (1857) the 8th Madras Light Cavalry from 1856 to 1861. The Governor General's Bodyguard, Madras, was raised in 1778 and was originally composed of a small body of European cavalry. Arbuthnot was a major-general in the 3rd Madras Light Cavalry in the HEIC.

Served with the British East India Company. He was a member of the Ootacamund Club, an archetypal British colonial institution.

Son of Alexander Arbuthnot. He was half brother of Alexander John Arbuthnot and General Charles George Arbuthnot. He married, 15 July 1829, Harriet Louisa Ormsby, daughter of Joseph Mason Ormsby. He died in Bath, Somerset.
