= George Arbuthnot (civil servant) =

- Born: 20 November 1802; Norbiton, Surrey
- Died: 28 July 1865 (aged 62)
- Occupation: Auditor of the civil list
- Spouses: Augusta Papendick, Louisa Anne Jones
- Children: General Henry Thomas Arbuthnot
- Relatives: Son of General Sir Robert Arbuthnot, KCB

George Arbuthnot (20 November 1802, Norbiton, Surrey - 28 July 1865) was a distinguished member of the permanent British civil service. He worked in the Treasury at the Colonial Office in Hong Kong when the HSBC charter was first drawn up; Arbuthnot Road, in Hong Kong, was named after him.

== Career ==
Arbuthnot served in the Treasury. He was appointed by Lord Liverpool a junior clerk in the Treasury 18 July 1820 and served with that department until his death, as private secretary to six successive Secretaries of the Treasury. In February, 1843, he was appointed private secretary to Sir Robert Peel and subsequently to Sir Charles Wood, later Viscount Halifax.

He was then holding the appointment of auditor of the civil list and was also secretary to the ecclesiastical commissioners. He was twice offered the appointment of financial member of the council of the governor-general of India, first on the death of Mr James Wilson, PC in 1860 and then on the retirement of Sir Charles Trevelyan in 1865, but was obliged to turn down the offer on health grounds on both occasions.

== Personal life ==
Arbuthnot was the son of Lt-General Sir Robert Arbuthnot, KCB.

He was married (1829) to Augusta Papendick (died 1853) and then (1857) to Louisa Anne Jones (daughter of Lt-General Sir Richard Jones, KCB). George Arbuthnot was father of General Henry Thomas Arbuthnot.

He wrote a retrospective economic analysis of the Bank Charter Act 1844:

- Sir Robert Peel's Act of 1844, Regulating the Issue of Bank Notes, Vindicated, Longman, 1857.

He died in 1865.
