= Charles Arbuthnot =

British diplomat and politician (1767–1850)

The Right Honourable Charles Arbuthnot
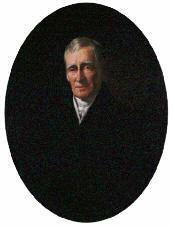
- Rt Hon Charles Arbuthnot

First Commissioner of Woods and Forests
- In office 1823 – 9 April 1827
- Monarch: George IV
- Prime Minister: The Earl of Liverpool
- Preceded by: William Huskisson
- Succeeded by: The Earl of Carlisle
- In office 11 February 1828 – 2 June 1828
- Monarch: George IV
- Prime Minister: The Duke of Wellington
- Preceded by: William Sturges Bourne
- Succeeded by: Viscount Lowther

Chancellor of the Duchy of Lancaster
- In office 2 June 1828 – 15 November 1830
- Monarch: George IV
- Prime Minister: The Duke of Wellington
- Preceded by: The Earl of Aberdeen
- Succeeded by: The Lord Holland

Personal details
- Born: 14 March 1767 Rockfleet, County Mayo
- Died: 18 August 1850 (aged 83) Apsley House, Piccadilly, London
- Party: Tory
- Spouse(s): (1) Marcia Clapcott-Lisle (1774–1806) (2) Harriet Fane (1793–1834)

Charles Arbuthnot (14 March 1767 – 18 August 1850) was a British diplomat and Tory politician. He was Ambassador to the Ottoman Empire between 1804 and 1807 and held a number of political offices. He was a good friend of the Duke of Wellington. His second wife, Harriet, became a hostess at Wellington's society dinners, and wrote an important diary cataloging contemporary political intrigues.

== Background ==
Arbuthnot was son of John Arbuthnot, FRS of Rockfleet, and his wife Anne Stone, daughter of the banker Robert Stone; he was brother of bishop Alexander Arbuthnot, General Sir Thomas Arbuthnot and General Sir Robert Arbuthnot. He was born in Rockfleet, County Mayo, Ireland, but much of his upbringing was with Andrew Stone, his mother's relation. He was educated at Westminster School, and matriculated at Christ Church, Oxford in 1784, graduating B.A. in 1788. He then went on a Grand Tour.

== Political and diplomatic career to 1804 ==
Arbuthnot joined the Foreign Office in 1793, where he impressed William Grenville, 1st Baron Grenville. He sat as Member of Parliament for East Looe between 1795 and 1796, after William Wellesley Pole stepped down because he could not support the war policies of William Pitt the younger.

Arbuthnot also held a number of diplomatic postings, notably as consul general in Portugal between 1800 and 1801, as Minister to Sweden. He served under Henry Addington as Under-Secretary of State for Foreign Affairs between November 1803 and June 1804. In 1804 he was sworn of the Privy Council.

== In Constantinople ==
Appointed on 6 June 1804 as Ambassador to the Ottoman Empire, Arbuthnot was the first ambassador in Constantinople under a new arrangement, whereby the Levant Company provided a consul-general, in this case Isaac Morier, who saw to commercial work. In 1806 Arbuthnot negotiated a trade treaty with the Reis ül-Küttab, Ahmed Vâsıf. He travelled out with William Pole-Tylney, nephew to Arthur and Richard Wellesley.

Arbuthnot was tasked in the early days of 1807 to bring Selim III into the Anglo-Russian camp opposed to France. He was unable to do that. In the context of a renewed Russo-Turkish War and tariff evasion under the commercial treaty, Arbuthnot pursued his own line, prepared to use force.

Selim with Horace Sébastiani successfully resisted a British naval expedition in the Dardanelles operation. Arbuthnot left Constantinople on 29 January 1807.

== Politics to 1812 ==
Arbuthnot was Member of Parliament for Eye between 1809 and 1812, taking up the seat when Henry Wellesley resigned. He became Secretary to the Treasury in 1809, and began attempts to manage public opinion for the government, by centralising management of the press.

Under Spencer Perceval, and then Lord Liverpool, Arbuthnot was Joint Secretary to the Treasury between 1809 and 1823.

== The Liverpool ministry ==
Arbuthnot sat for Orford between 1812 and 1818, a pocket borough of the 2nd Marquess of Hertford, in a deal with the Liverpool ministry on behalf of Edmond Alexander MacNaghten. Arbuthnot and Robert Jenkinson, later Lord Liverpool, had known each other in college days at Christ Church.

Arbuthnot held the position of Patronage Secretary, and also played the role of "general cabinet fixer". In September 1812, John McMahon, private secretary to the Prince Regent, tried Arbuthnot in an attempt to shut down a series of scurrilous articles in the Morning Chronicle. They purported to be an epic and extended review of a poem by Charlotte Dacre on the Prince and his circle, and referenced the Prince's affair with the Marchioness of Hertford. These squibs have been attributed by David V. Erdman to Lord Byron. Liverpool disapproved of the subsidy Arbuthnot was giving Lewis Goldsmith, founder of The Anti-Gallican Monitor, a project of 1811 of Arbuthnot and John Charles Herries; and ran it down, ending it in 1814.

During Arbuthnot's time in charge of patronage, a Treasury appointment, over 2,000 sinecure posts were abolished. He noted the effect the reforms were having on his influence on Members of Parliament. He is taken to have been the de facto Tory whip. The responsibility for party discipline was only later recognised by a seat in the Cabinet.

Subsequently Arbuthnot sat for St Germans between 1818 and 1827. The constituency was controlled by John Eliot, 2nd Baron Eliot (as he was in 1818). Under Liverpool he was First Commissioner of Woods and Forests between 1823 and 1827.

== Later life and death ==
Arbuthnot was Member of Parliament for St Ives between 1828 and 1830 and for Ashburton between 1830 and 1831. At St Ives he was the favoured successor of Sir Christopher Hawkins, 1st Baronet. For a time in 1828 a rival candidate was promoted, Guy Lenox Prendergast, but he withdrew before the poll. Ashburton was controlled by landlords Robert Trefusis, 18th Baron Clinton and Sir Lawrence Vaughan Palk. Arbuthnot was elected with Palk in 1830, and resigned in 1831.

Under Arthur Wellesley, 1st Duke of Wellington, Arbuthnot was First Commissioner of Woods and Forests in 1828 and Chancellor of the Duchy of Lancaster between 1828 and 1830. In the 1830s he remained a major figure in the party management of the Tories, working with John Charles Herries, William Holmes and Joseph Planta.

During the last years of Arbuthnot's life, after the death of his second wife Harriet, he turned over the family home to his eldest son, and moved into the Duke of Wellington's London residence, Apsley House, as his confidential friend. Their story is told in Wellington and the Arbuthnots by E. A. Smith.

Charles Arbuthnot died at Apsley House in August 1850, aged 83. Spiridione Gambardella's portrait of him is kept there. He was buried at Kensal Green Cemetery.

== Works ==
- The Correspondence of Charles Arbuthnot (1941), edited by Arthur Aspinall

== Personal life and family ==
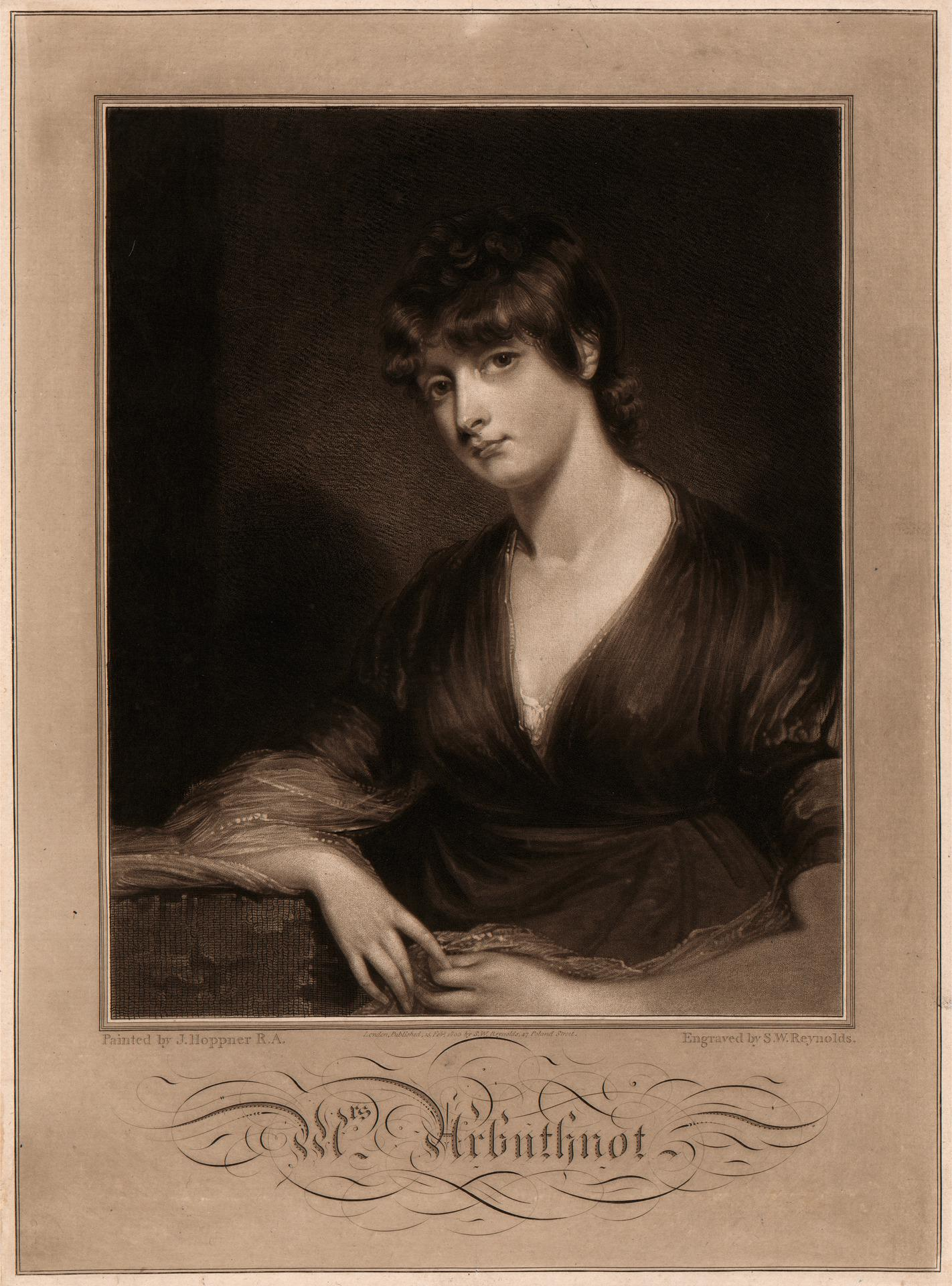
Engraved portrait of Marcia Clapcott-Lisle (1774–1806), first wife of Charles Arbuthnot

Arbuthnot was first married on 28 February 1799 to Marcia Mary Anne Clapcott Lisle, at Cholmondeley House, Piccadilly. She had been Lady-in-Waiting since 1795 to Caroline of Brunswick, Princess of Wales. She died in Constantinople on 24 May 1806.

Arbuthnot married a second time on 31 January 1814 at Fulbeck, Lincolnshire, to Harriet Fane (1793–1834), daughter of the Hon. Henry Fane. Harriet was fascinated by politics. During her marriage to Arbuthnot, she became a hostess at society dinners given by Arbuthnot's good friend, the Duke of Wellington. Smith rejects the suggestion that Harriet was Wellington's mistress. Her diaries were published as The Journal of Mrs Arbuthnot in 1950.

With his first wife Marcia, Arbuthnot's children were:

- Charles George James Arbuthnot (1799–1870). He married Charlotte Eliza Vivian, daughter of Hussey Vivian, 1st Baron Vivian.
- Caroline Emma Arbuthnot (1802–1852)
- Henry Arbuthnot (1803–1875), married in 1830 Charlotte Rachael Scott, daughter of Thomas Scott, 2nd Earl of Clonmell.
- Marcia Emma Georgiana Arbuthnot (1804–1878), who married William Cholmondeley, 3rd Marquess of Cholmondeley.

Arbuthnot had an illegitimate son, from the days before he first married, mentioned in correspondence with his clerical friend John Sneyd (1763–1835), brother of Walter Sneyd. These letters discuss also his nickname "Gosh", which spread from his familiar circle to being generally used, and mistaken for his surname; and his interest in John de Mainauduc, Irish-Huguenot practitioner of animal magnetism. Of Arthur Paget, Arbuthnot's replacement in 1807 at Constantinople, George Canning as incoming Secretary of State for Foreign Affairs in the second Portland administration wrote "I must send him to repair if possible the mischief poor Gosh has been doing there."

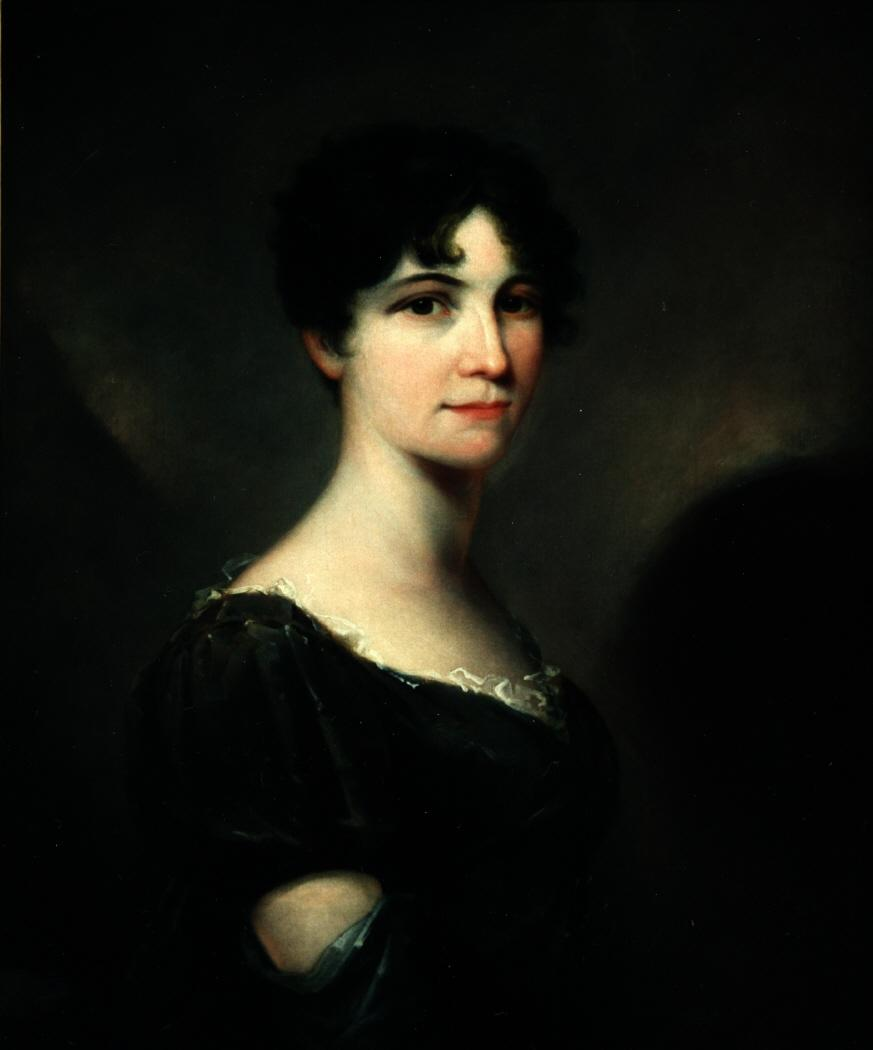
Harriet Fane (1793–1834), second wife of Charles Arbuthnot, portrait by John Hoppner, now in the Foundation Lazzaro Galdiano, Madrid

Parliament of Great Britain
Preceded by Hon. William Wellesley-Pole; Robert Wood	Member of Parliament for East Looe; 1795–1796; With: Robert Wood	Succeeded by John Buller; William Graves
Parliament of the United Kingdom
Preceded by Hon. Henry Wellesley; Mark Singleton	Member of Parliament for Eye; 1809–1812; With: Mark Singleton	Succeeded by Mark Singleton; Sir William Garrow
Preceded by William Sloane; Lord Henry Seymour Moore	Member of Parliament for Orford; 1812–1818; With: Edmond MacNaghten	Succeeded by Edmund Alexander Macnaghten; John Douglas
Preceded by William Henry Pringle; Henry Goulburn	Member of Parliament for St Germans; 1818–1827; With: Seymour Thomas Bathurst 1818–1826; Charles Ross 1826–1827	Succeeded by Charles Ross; James Loch
Preceded by Sir Christopher Hawkins, Bt; James Halse	Member of Parliament for St Ives; 1828–1830; With: James Halse	Succeeded by William Pole-Tylney-Long-Wellesley; James Morrison
Preceded by Sir Lawrence Palk, Bt; William Sturges Bourne	Member of Parliament for Ashburton; 1830–1831; With: Sir Lawrence Palk, Bt	Succeeded by Sir Lawrence Palk, Bt; William Stephen Poyntz
Political offices
Preceded by The Marquess of Bristol	Under-Secretary of State for Foreign Affairs; 1803–1804	Succeeded by Hon. William Eliot
Preceded by William Huskisson; Hon. Henry Wellesley	Joint Secretary to the Treasury; 1809–1823; With: Richard Wharton 1809–1814; Stephen Rumbold Lushington 1814–1823	Succeeded by Stephen Rumbold Lushington; John Charles Herries
Preceded by William Huskisson	First Commissioner of Woods and Forests; 1823–1827	Succeeded by The Earl of Carlisle
Preceded by William Sturges Bourne	First Commissioner of Woods and Forests; 1828	Succeeded by Viscount Lowther
Preceded by The Earl of Aberdeen	Chancellor of the Duchy of Lancaster; 1828–1830	Succeeded by The Lord Holland
Diplomatic posts
Preceded by Daniel Hailes	Ambassador to Sweden; 1802–1804	Succeeded by Hon. Henry Manvers Pierrepont
Preceded by William Drummond	Ambassador to the Ottoman Empire; 1804–1807	Succeeded by Hon. Sir Arthur Paget
