= Ralph Snowball =

Australian photographer

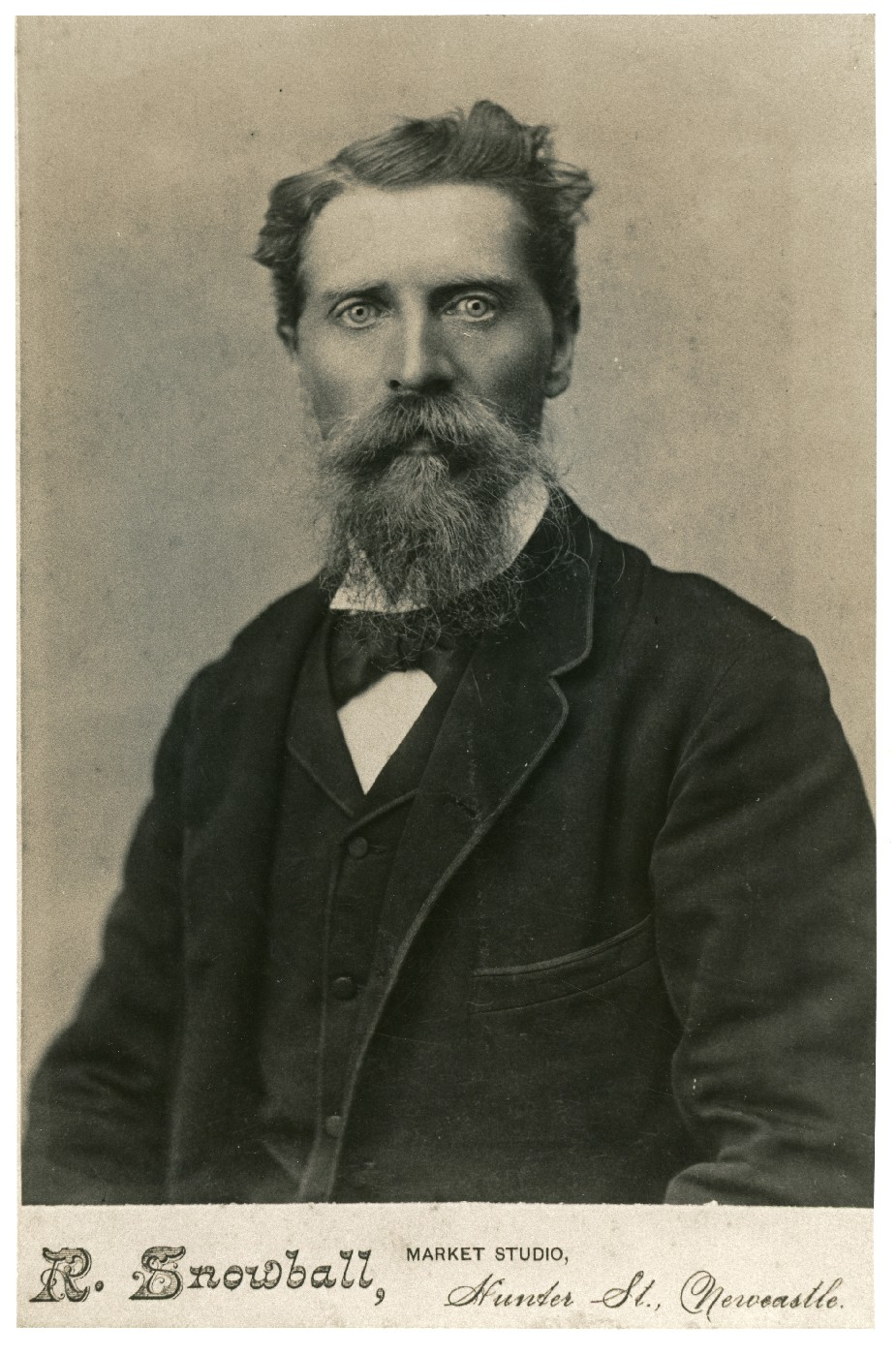
- Born: 19 November 1849; Leadgate, County Durham, England
- Died: 4 August 1925 (aged 76); Wallsend, New South Wales, Australia
- Burial place: Sandgate Cemetery, Australia
- Occupations: miner, photographer
- Years active: 1884–1915
- Spouse: Mary Trotter
- Children: 7

Ralph Snowball (19 November 1849 – 4 August 1925) was an Australian photographer. He had studios in New Lambton and Newcastle, NSW where he created a significant collection of images of Newcastle and surrounding areas in the late 19th and early 20th centuries.

== Personal life ==
Snowball was born in Leadgate, County Durham, England. At the age of 11 he began working at the Blaydon Main Colliery as a trapper-boy. He worked as a coal-miner in Durham and then in America for three years before coming to Australia.

In 1879 Snowball, his wife Mary and son, George (2) arrived in Australia on board the Ninevah. They settled in New Lambton. From 1883 Ralph Snowball worked at the Lambton Colliery as a miner. He worked at the colliery until June, 1884. After leaving the colliery, he began his career as a prolific photographer.

In 1889 with the formation of the New Lambton municipality, he was appointed the first Town Clerk.

He retired as a professional photographer in 1915.

Snowball died aged 76 on 4 August 1925 at Wallsend Hospital and is buried in the Anglican section at Sandgate Cemetery Mary Snowball died on 27 April 1942 aged 90.

== Photography career ==
Snowball began taking photographs in 1884. The majority of his photographs were taken outside of his studios. His subjects of his photographs reflected the social and economic life of the city, with images of coal mines, Newcastle harbour, school and social club group photos, ships, tombstones and other scenes of interest.

In the early years of his career, his studio and darkroom were in his home in New Lambton. On 28 November 1887 he bought the "Market Studio" in Newcastle from W. F. Roberts. This gave him a base in the commercial heart of the city.

Over the course of his career Snowball took thousands of images. In late 1988 between 700–800 boxes of negatives were found under his house in New Lambton. These boxes contained at least 8,000 glass negatives. After review, 2,000 were discarded due to irreparable damage. The approximately 5,000 remaining negatives were distributed between the City of Newcastle Local Studies Section and the University of Newcastle Special Collections.

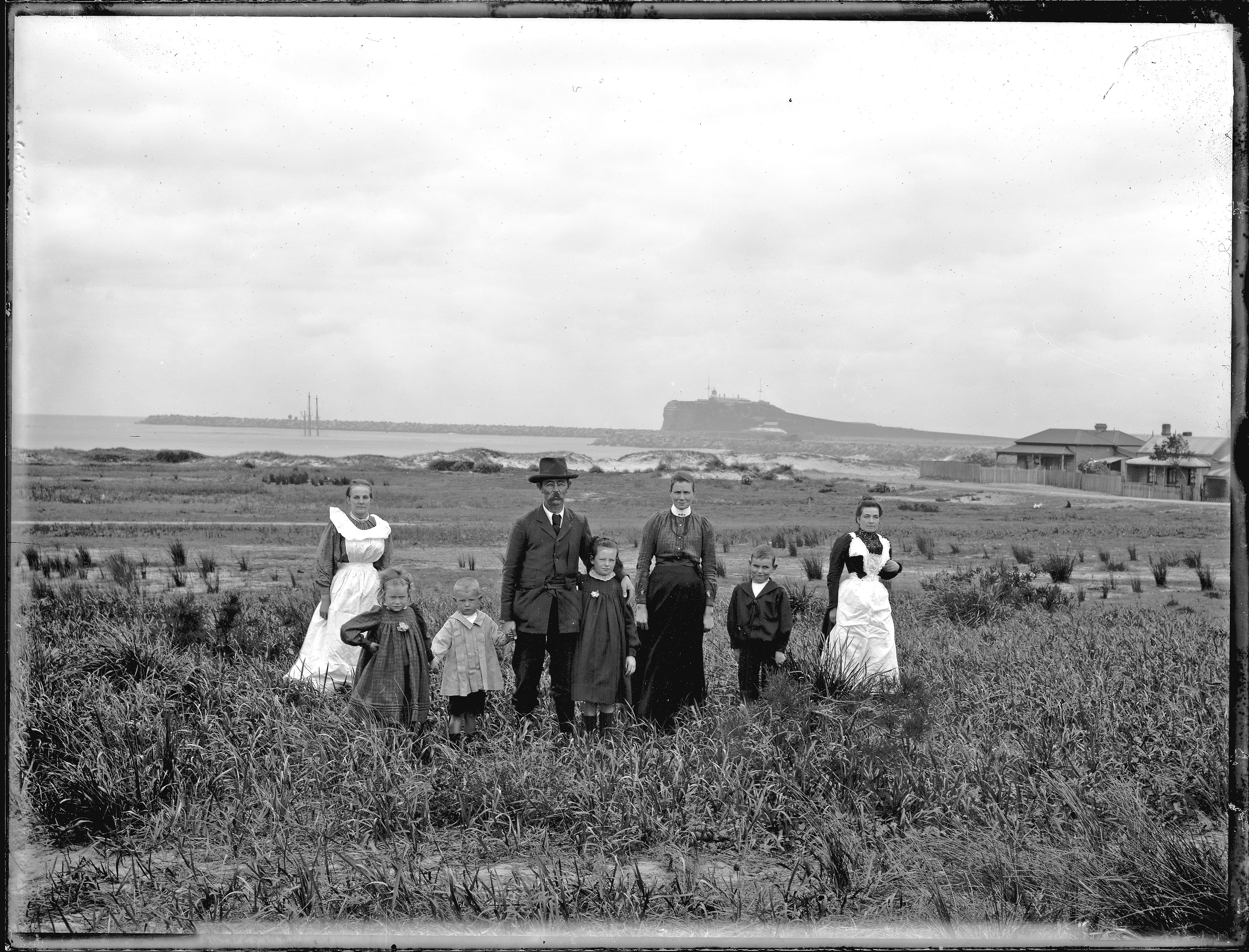
Mrs. and Mr. A. Graham's family group at Stockton by Ralph Snowball

== Publications ==
- Lovett, Bert; Barney, Norm; Snowball, Ralph (1989), With camera, horse and waggonette : the Newcastle and Lake Macquarie photographs of Ralph Snowball, Saucy Jack
- Barney, Norm; Snowball, Ralph (1990), Bygone days in Newcastle and Lake Macquarie : photographs from the Snowball Collection, Saucy Jack Publications
- Lovett, Bert; Barney, Norm (1990), Newcastle and Lake Macquarie yesterday and today, Saucy Jack Publications
- Keating, Julie; Snowball, Ralph (2015), Lambton : a nineteenth century mining town / compiled by Julie Keating; photos by Ralph Snowball, Julie Keating
- Keating, Julie; Snowball, Ralph (2016), Waratah & Mayfield : nineteenth century industrial towns / compiled by Julie Keating, photos by Ralph Snowball, Julie Keating
- Keating, Julie; Snowball, Ralph (2017), Newcastle's Hunter Street ... the first hundred years / compiled by Julie Keating; photos by Ralph Snowball and others, Julie Keating
- Keating, Julie; Snowball, Ralph (2017), Newcastle's Harbour foreshore ... the first hundred years / compiled by Julie Keating; photos by Ralph Snowball and others, Julie Keating
- Keating, Julie; Snowball, Ralph (2019), Wickham, Islington & Tighes Hill : the early days near Throsby Creek / compiled by Julie Keating; photos by Ralph Snowball and others, Julie Keating
- Keating, Julie; Snowball, Ralph (2016), Merewether & The Junction : nineteenth century industrial towns / compiled by Julie Keating; photos by Ralph Snowball, Julie Keating

== Gallery ==
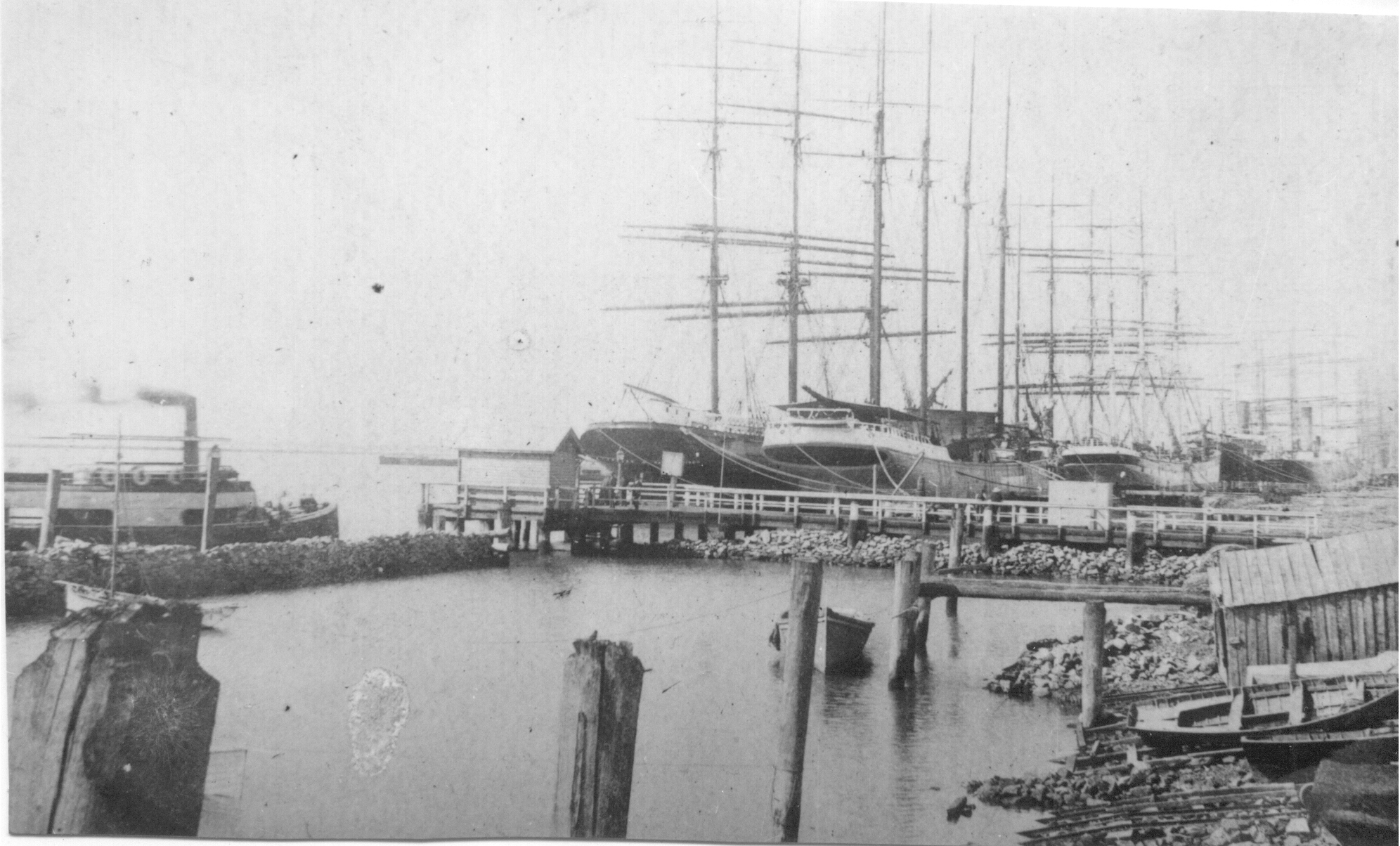
North Stockton ferry wharf

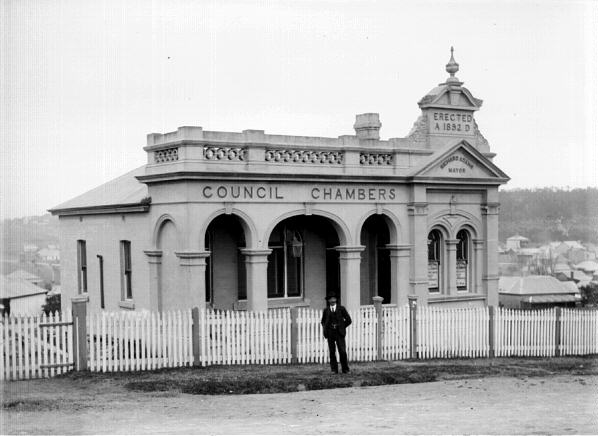
Adamstown Council Chambers

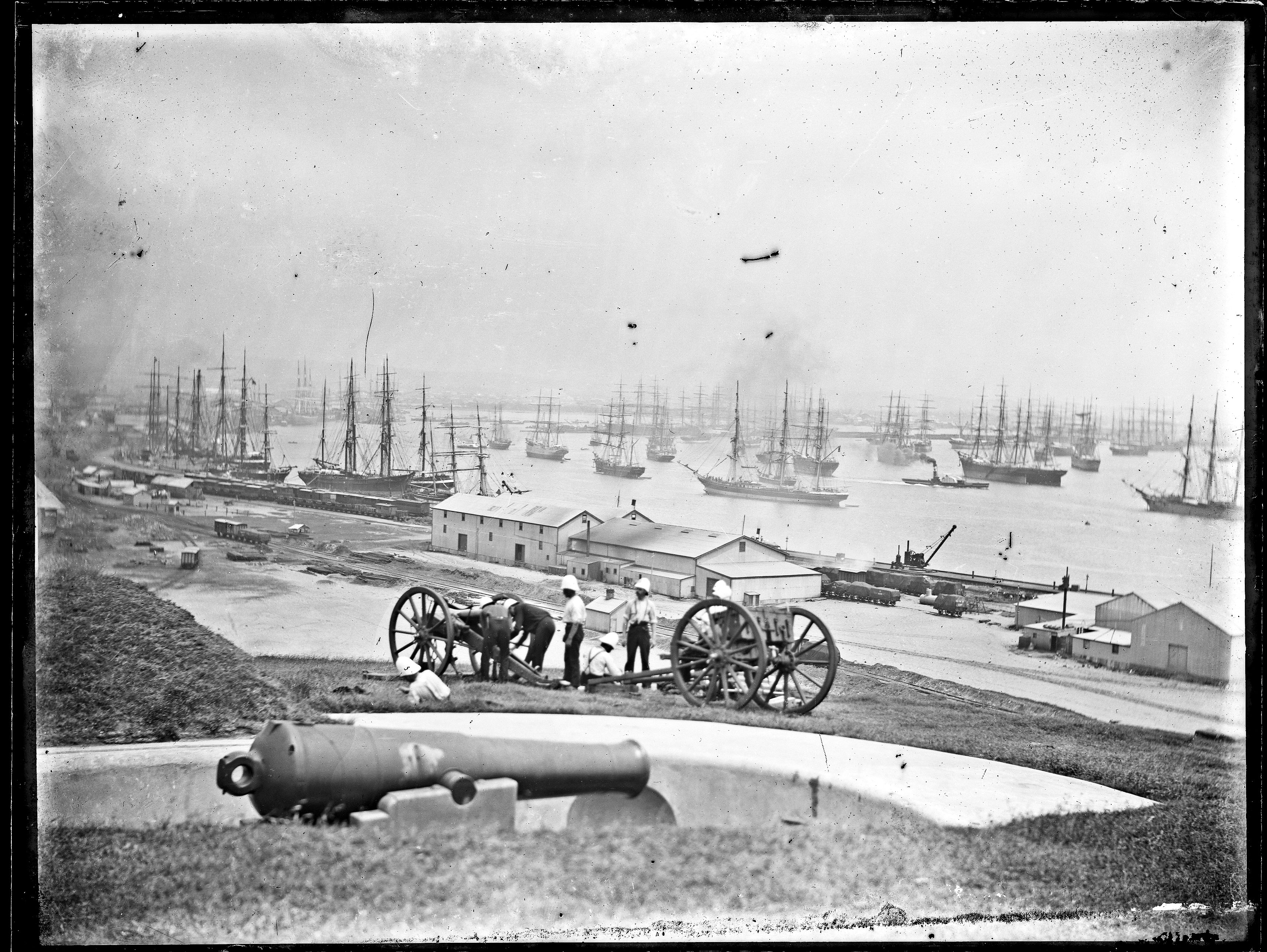
Newcastle Harbour from Fort Scratchley November 1890

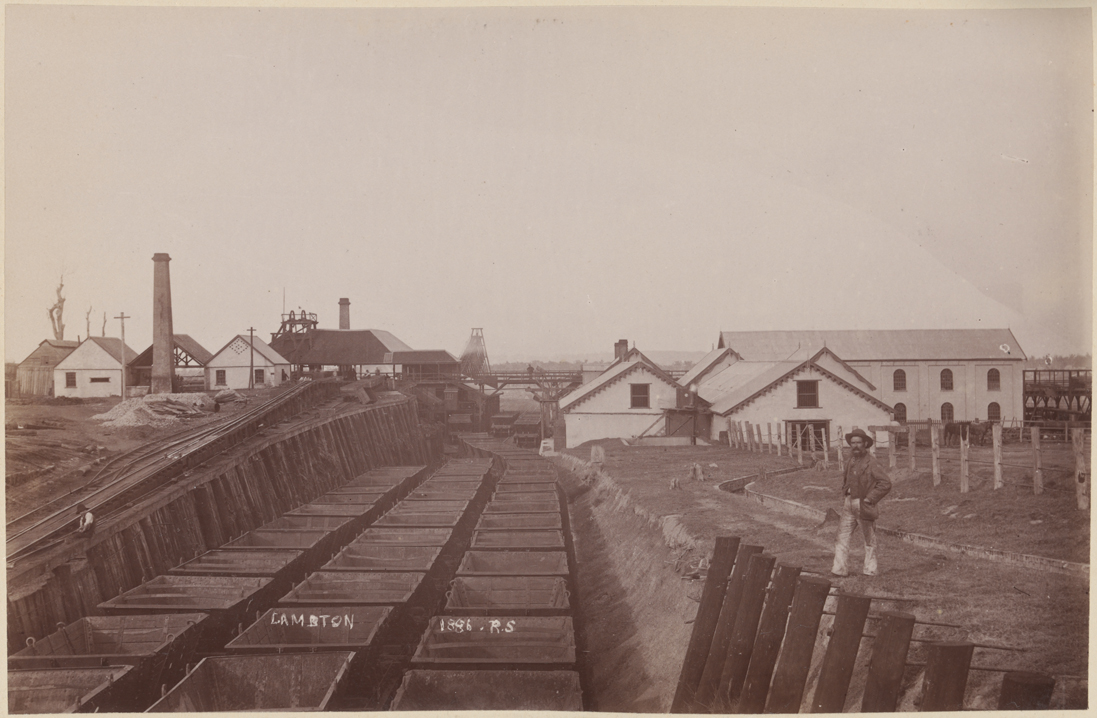
Lambton Colliery, 1886

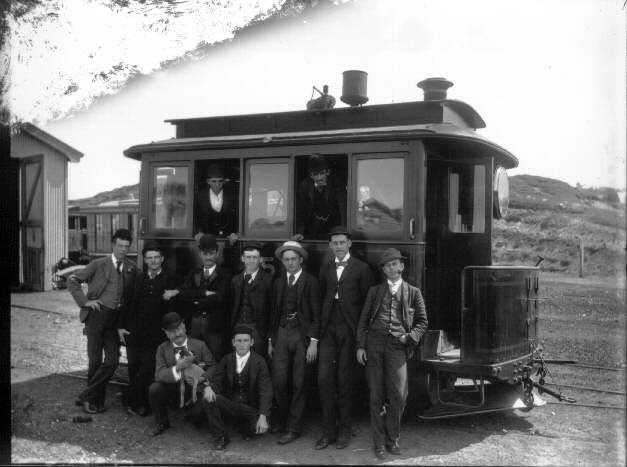
Steam Tram at Parnell Place

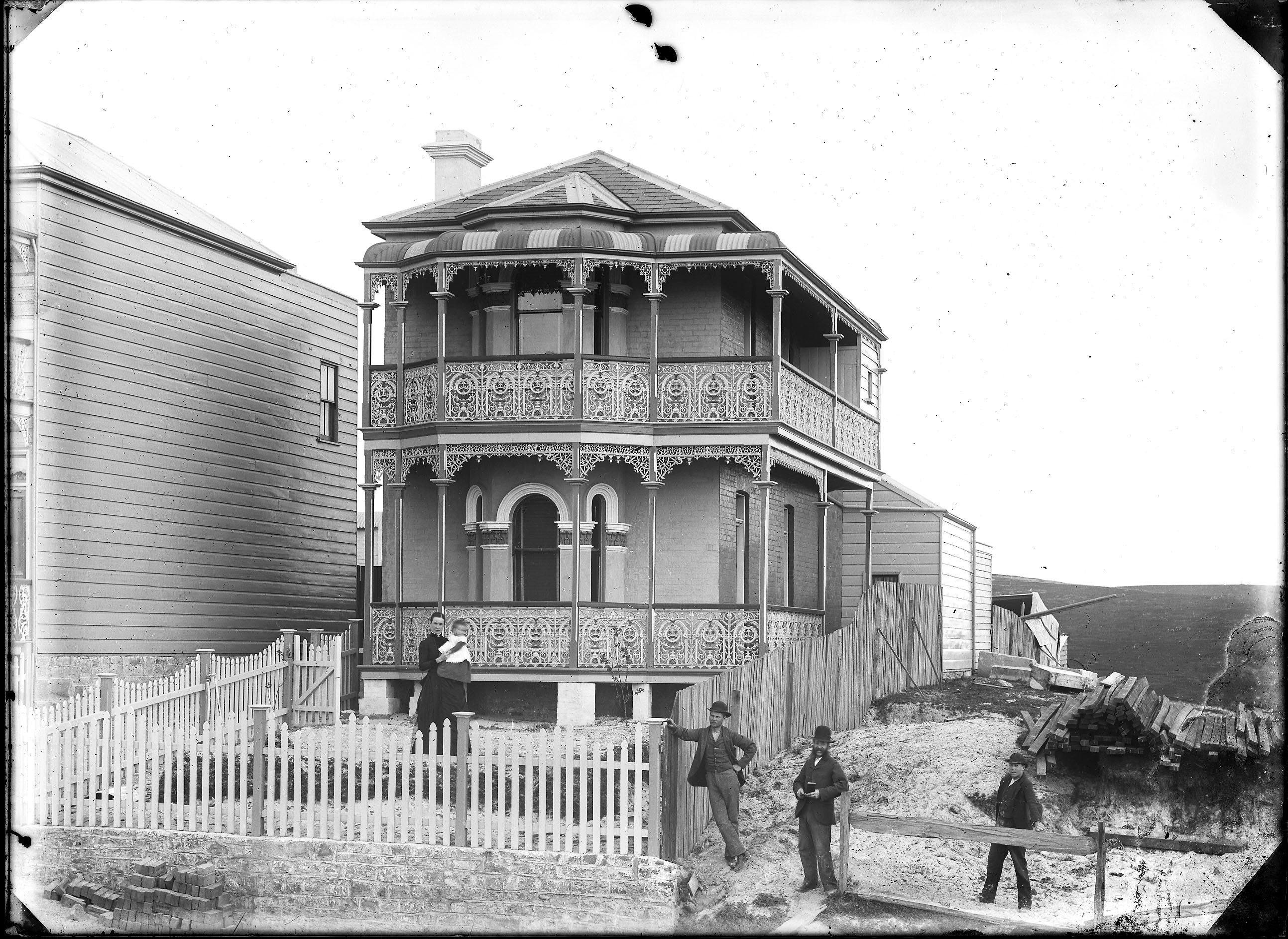
Tyrrell Street house
