= Robert Arbuthnot (British Army officer) =

British Army general

Lieutenant-General Sir Robert Arbuthnot KCB
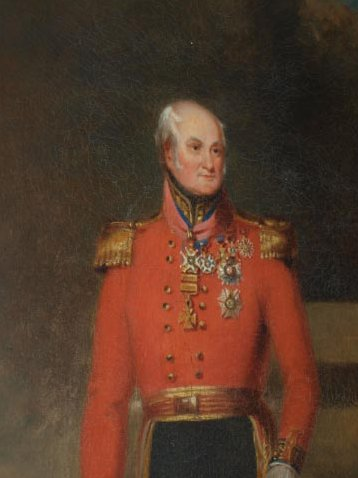

16th General Officer Commanding, Ceylon
- In office 1839–?
- Preceded by: John Wilson
- Succeeded by: Colin Campbell

Personal details
- Born: 19 November 1773 Rockfleet Castle, County Mayo
- Died: 6 May 1853 (aged 79) Hanover Lodge, Regent's Park
- Spouse(s): 1 Susan Vesey (2) Harriet Smith
- Relations: Son of John Arbuthnot of Rockfleet Castle; Brother of Rt Rev Alexander Arbuthnot and General Sir Thomas Arbuthnot and Charles Arbuthnot
- Children: George Arbuthnot
- Website: "Family tree". Archived from the original on 23 August 2021.

Military service
- Allegiance: United Kingdom
- Branch/service: British Army
- Rank: Lieutenant-General
- Unit: 76th Regiment of Foot
- Commands: General Officer Commanding, Ceylon

Lieutenant-General Sir Robert Arbuthnot, KCB (19 November 1773 – 6 May 1853) was a British military commander during the Napoleonic Wars. He was a general in the army, a colonel in the 76th Regiment of Foot. He was a brigadier general in the Portuguese Service and was appointed a Knight of the Tower and Sword of Portugal (KTS).

He was awarded the Army Gold Cross, with three clasps, for the battles of Busaco, Albuera, Badajoz, Nivelle, Nive, Orthez, and Toulouse, and the Military General Service Medal, with two clasps, for Corunna and Ciudad Rodrigo.

== Biography ==
Arbuthnot was born at Rockfleet Castle, County Mayo, Ireland, the fourth son of agriculturist John Arbuthnot Senior of Rockfleet, Co Mayo. He was the brother of the Right Honourable Charles Arbuthnot, Bishop Alexander Arbuthnot and of Lieutenant-general Sir Thomas Arbuthnot.

He entered the army as a cornet in the 23rd Light Dragoons on 1 January 1797, and was present at the Battle of Ballinamuck in the Irish rebellion on 8 September of the following year. He subsequently served with his regiment at the capture of the Cape of Good Hope in 1806, and in South America as aide-de-camp to General (afterwards Lord) William Beresford, with whom and the rest of the troops under General Beresford's command he was made a prisoner of war, and remained a prisoner for 18 months, until released under the convention made by General Whitelock. On his return from America, Arbuthnot, then a captain in the 20th Light Dragoons, resumed his position on General Beresford's staff at Madeira, and served with him as aide-de-camp, and afterwards as military secretary, throughout the greater part of the Peninsular War.

Besides the Battle of Ballinamuck, two at the Cape, and three in South America, Sir Robert was present at the Battle of Corunna, the passage of the Douro, the battle of Busaco, the lines of Torres Vedras, the siege and reduction of Olivenza, the first siege of Badajoz, the battle of Albuera, the siege and storming of Ciudad Rodrigo, the third siege and storming of Badajoz, the battles of the Nivelle, Nive, passage of the Adour, and the battles of Orthes and Toulouse. He received the gold cross and three clasps for Busaco, Albuera, Badajoz, Nivelle, the Nive, Orthez, and Toulouse, and the war medal and two clasps for Corunna and Ciudad Rodrigo. He also received Portuguese and Spanish orders, including the special star given by the Portuguese government to all English officers of superior rank engaged at Albuera. He brought home the despatches regarding Albuera, and on that occasion was appointed a brevet lieutenant-colonel. He was created a knight of the Tower and Sword by the government of Portugal, and in 1815 was appointed a Knight Commander of the Order of the Bath (KCB). In 1830, he attained the rank of major-general, and in 1838 was appointed to the command of the troops in Ceylon, after which he commanded a division in Bengal until his promotion as lieutenant-general in 1841. In 1843, he was appointed colonel of the 76th Foot.

At Albuera he distinguished himself by galloping between two regiments, the British 57th and a Spanish regiment, and stopping the fire which by mistake they were exchanging – a feat which he performed without receiving a single wound. In the same battle, at a critical moment, he was enabled by his quickness of sight to discern a retrograde movement on the part of the French, which Marshal Beresford had not perceived, and induced the latter to recall an order which he had just given for the retirement of two batteries of artillery. At an earlier period, in South America, when he and General Beresford were prisoners in the hands of the Spanish, and when all the officers were about to be searched for papers, he contrived by a clever stratagem to secrete in an orchard an important document, viz. the convention which had been executed between General Beresford and the Spanish general Linieres, and of which the Spanish were anxious to regain possession.

== Family ==
He married his first wife, Susan Vesey in Belfast on 1 February 1802 (who died in Teddington, Twickenham on 30 June 1822). Susan was the only child of Colonel William Vesey of Farm Hill. Sir Robert married second at St James's Church, Piccadilly, 4 January 1826, Harriet Smith (dsp 5 December 1861), daughter of and co-heir of Thomas Smith of Castleton Hall, Lancashire.

Military offices
Preceded by John Wilson	General Officer Commanding, Ceylon; 1839–?	Succeeded by Colin Campbell
Preceded by George Middlemore	Colonel of 76th Regiment of Foot; 1843–1853	Succeeded by William Jervois
