= Charles George James Arbuthnot =

British Army general

General Charles George James Arbuthnot DL
- Born: 1801; At sea (HMS Juno)
- Died: 1870 (aged 68 or 69)
- Relatives: Son of Charles Arbuthnot
- Military career
- Allegiance: British
- Branch: British Army
- Rank: General
- Commands: 72nd Duke of Albany's own Highlanders
- Other work: Equerry to the Queen

General Charles George James Arbuthnot, DL (1801 – 21 October 1870) was a British general.

== Early life ==
Arbuthnot was born at sea aboard the frigate Juno and raised at Woodford, Northamptonshire. His father, Charles Arbuthnot, was a prominent Tory politician, diplomat and confidant of the Duke of Wellington. He was made a Page of Honour to George III in 1812 (at the age of eleven or twelve).

== Military career ==
Arbuthnot was made an Ensign in the Grenadier Guards in 1816, was promoted to Captain of the 28th Regiment in 1820, and was made lieutenant colonel of the 72nd Regiment in 1825. He was returned to Parliament from the rotten borough of Tregony in 1831, but resigned the seat in the following year by becoming Steward of the Manor of East Hundred. On 19 May 1831, he left the 72nd and became lieutenant-colonel of the 90th Regiment, replacing Lord George Russell.

In 1833, Arbuthnot married Hon. Charlotte Eliza Vivian, eldest daughter of Hussey Vivian, 1st Baron Vivian. Their only child, Charlotte Letitia Caroline Arbuthnot (d. 1884), married Herbert Harley Murray. Returning to the lieutenant-colonelcy of the 72nd Regiment on 23 February 1838, Arbuthnot was brevetted colonel on 28 June 1838. When Sir Robert Peel became Prime Minister, Queen Victoria asked Charles to become her Equerry in Ordinary (a senior aide). He replaced Lord Alfred Paget in the post on 10 September 1841. Two months later Peel offered to help him get into Parliament but after discussion with his father he decided he would be more useful at court.

In 1842, the 72nd was called out to help suppress the "Plug-Drawing Riots" in Lancashire. While supporting the local constabulary in Blackburn, Arbuthnot and his troops were ordered by the local magistrate to fire on a stone-throwing crowd to disperse it. Several rioters were injured, but none fatally. On 14 April 1843, he gave up the lieutenant-colonelcy of the 72nd to Lord Arthur Lennox.

On 1 August 1846, Arbuthnot resigned as equerry, to be replaced by Charles Beaumont Phipps. He was promoted major-general in 1851, appointed to the colonelcy of the 89th Regiment on 9 July 1857, and promoted lieutenant-general in 1858. Arbuthnot was appointed a deputy lieutenant of Northamptonshire, on 21 January 1861, and became colonel of the 91st Regiment on 4 July 1864. Promoted general on 25 November 1865, he was appointed to command the 72nd Regiment on 27 August 1870, he died shortly thereafter, on 21 October 1870.

Parliament of the United Kingdom
Preceded by James Adam Gordon; James Mackillop	Member of Parliament for Tregony; 1831–1832; With: James Mackillop	Succeeded by James Mackillop; James Adam Gordon
Court offices
Preceded by Henry Somerset	Page of Honour; 1812–1817	Succeeded by Frederick Paget
Military offices
Preceded by Sir Charles Bulkeley Egerton	Colonel of the 89th Regiment of Foot; 1857–1864	Succeeded by Charles Gascoyne
Preceded by Charles Murray Hay	Colonel of the 91st (the Argyllshire Highlanders) Regiment of Foot; 1864–1870	Succeeded by James Craufurd
Preceded by Sir John Aitchison	Colonel of the 72nd (or Duke of Albany's Own Highlanders) Regiment of Foot; 1870	Succeeded by Charles Gascoyne
