= Rockfleet Castle =

- Caisleán Charraig an Chabhlaigh (Irish)
- Carrickahowley Castle
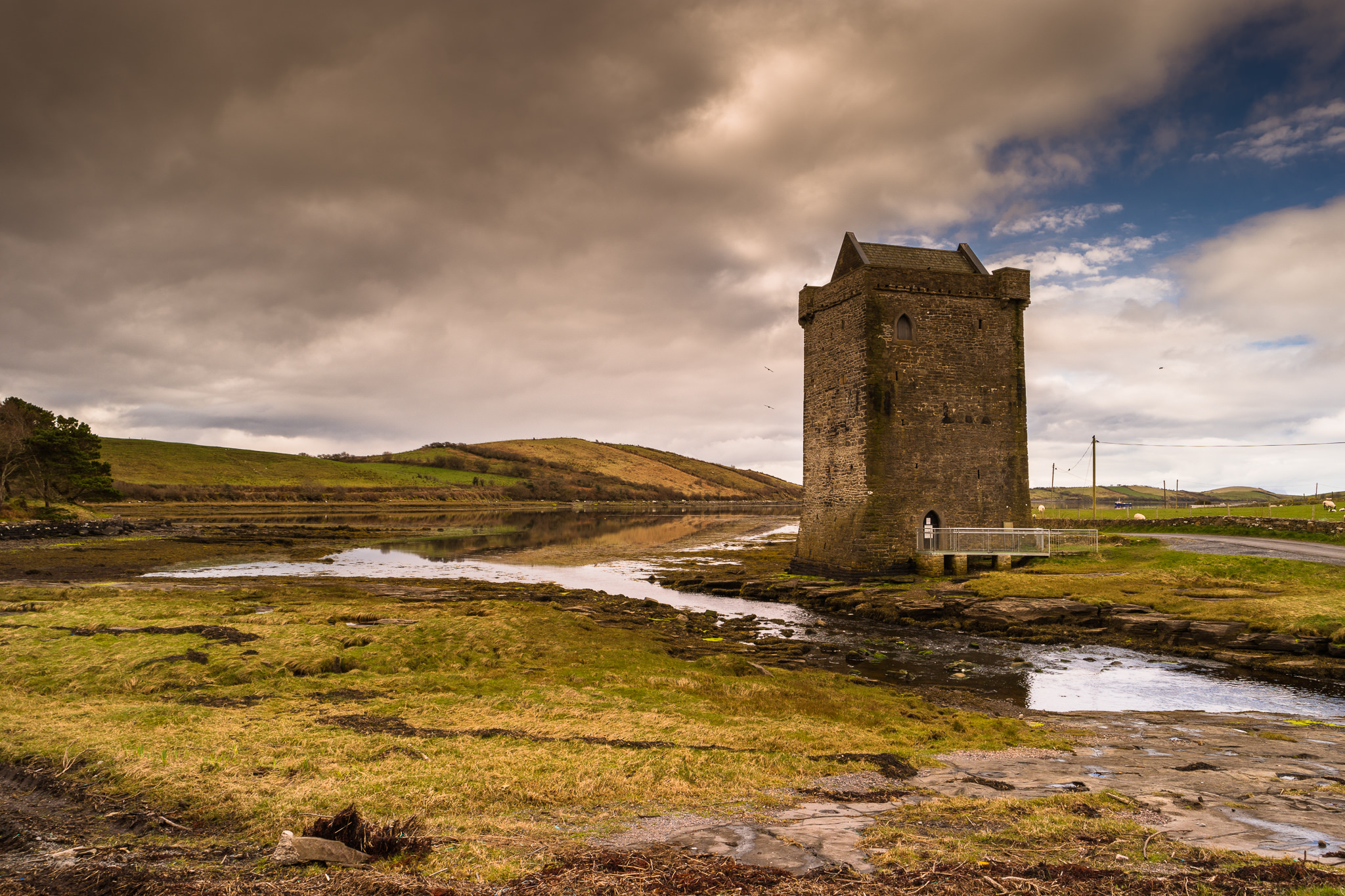

- Location within Ireland
- 53.896133°N 9.627050°W
- Type: Tower house
- Location: Near Newport, County Mayo, Ireland
- Nearest city: Galway

History
- Founder: Umhaill (O'Malleys)
- Built: c. 1550

Site notes
- Height: 18 m (59 ft)
- Owner: Privately owned; in the care of the Office of Public Works

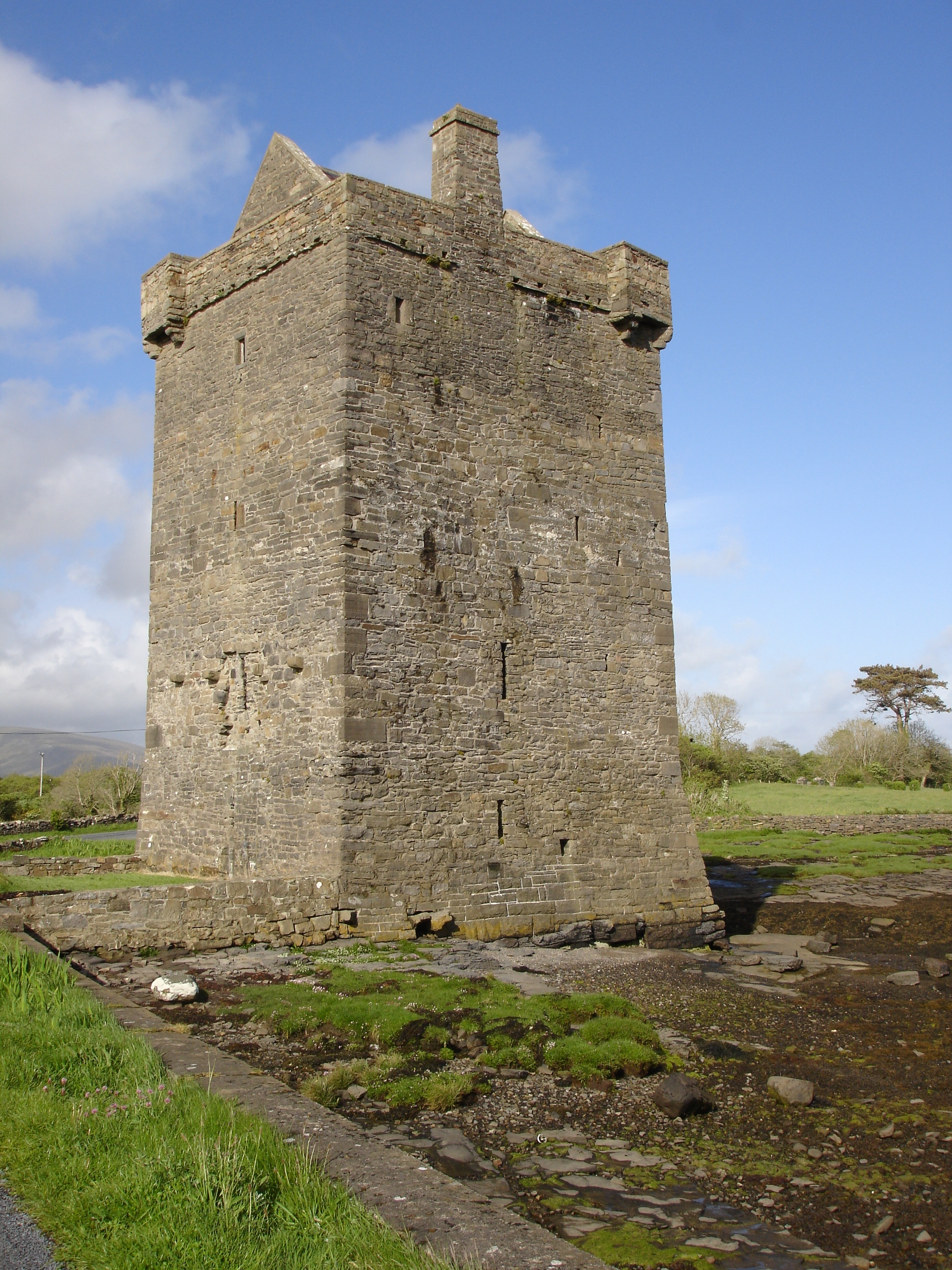
Rockfleet Castle

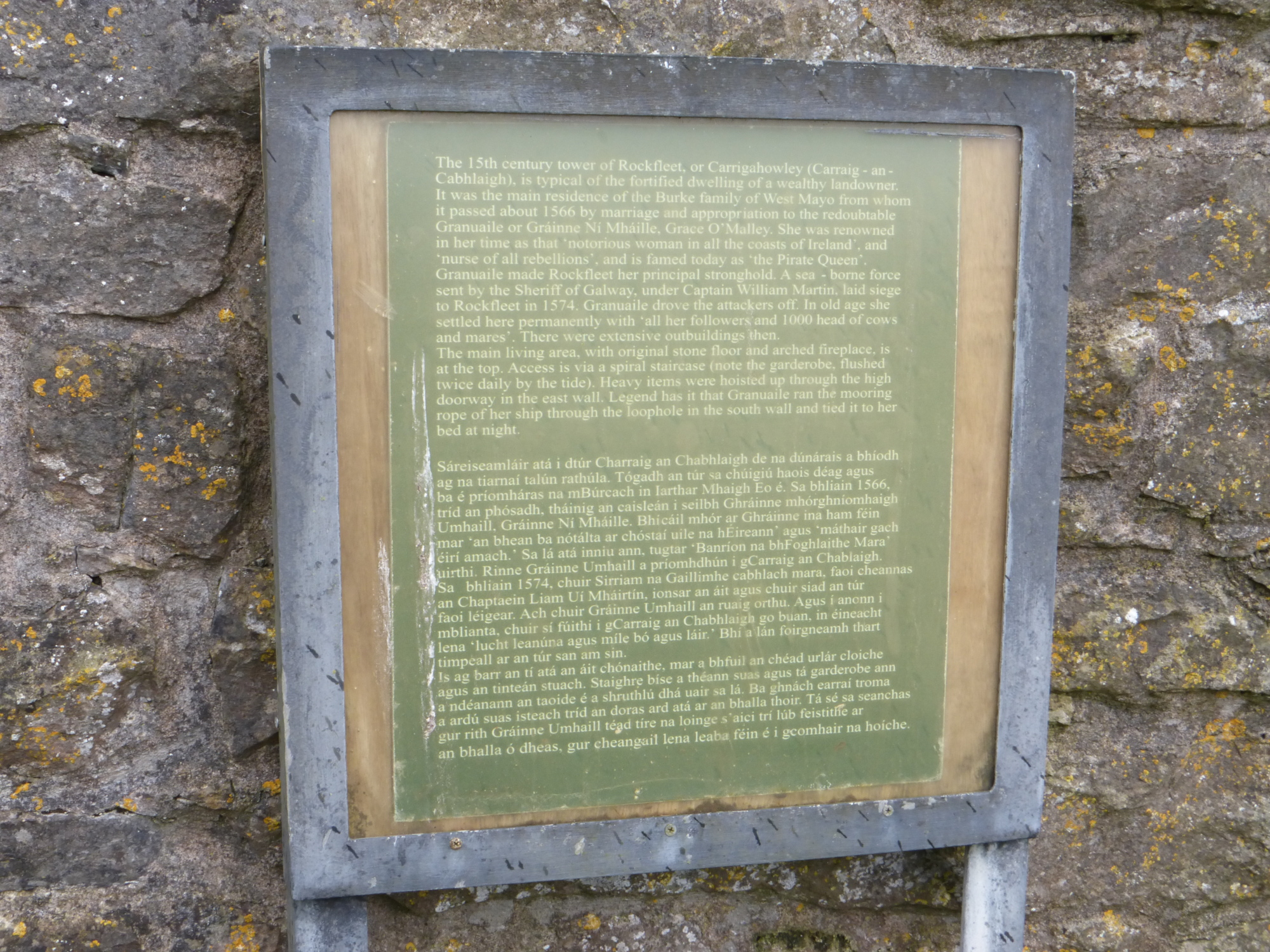
Historical information outside Rockfleet Castle

Rockfleet Castle, or Carrickahowley Castle (Irish: Carraig an Chabhlaigh), is a tower house near Newport in County Mayo, Ireland. It was built in the mid-fifteenth century, and is most famously associated with Grace O'Malley, the 'pirate queen' and chieftain of the Clan O’Malley. The castle has been speculated as her place of death. It is also known as Carraigahowley, which means "rock of the fleet".

Rockfleet Castle has four floors and is over eighteen metres in height looking out towards the drumlins of Clew Bay. Though entry to the castle was once available to the public, it is now strictly prohibited for safety reasons. The castle was installed with a metal walkway in 2015, from its adjacent grassland surrounding to its door due to the sheer inconvenience of accessing its entrance during high tides. In 2017, the exterior masonry was pointed.
