= Charles Arbuthnot (British Army officer, born 1824) =

British Army officer (1824–1889)

Lieutenant-General Sir Charles Arbuthnot GCB
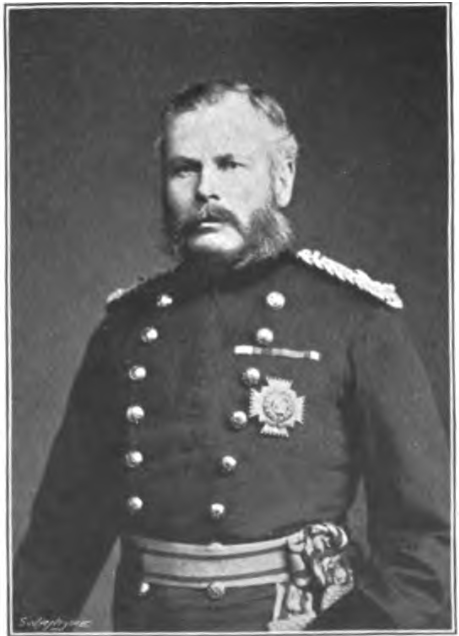
- Born: 19 May 1824; Killaloe, Ireland
- Died: 14 April 1899 (aged 74)
- Relatives: Alexander Arbuthnot (father); Sir Alexander Arbuthnot (brother); Charles Crombie (grandson)
- Military career
- Allegiance: United Kingdom
- Branch: British Army
- Rank: Lieutenant-General
- Commands: Bombay Army; Madras Army
- Conflicts: Crimean War; Second Anglo-Afghan War; Third Anglo-Burmese War
- Awards: Knight Grand Cross of the Order of the Bath

Lieutenant-General Sir Charles George Arbuthnot, GCB (19 May 1824 – 14 April 1899) was a British Army officer. He served in the Royal Artillery in the Crimean War and rose to become a senior officer in British India.

== Early life ==
Arbuthnot was born on 19 May 1824 and was a twin, the son of Alexander Arbuthnot, Bishop of Killaloe. His older brother, Alexander John Arbuthnot, became a senior civil servant in India. His half-brother, George Bingham Arbuthnot, was an honorary major general and Colonel of the Madras Light Cavalry in India. He was educated at Rugby and attended the Royal Military Academy, Woolwich.

== Military career ==
Arbuthnot was commissioned as a second lieutenant in the Royal Artillery on 17 June 1843. He served in the Crimean War as a captain in the 10th Battalion of the Royal Artillery. He was slightly wounded in minor actions near Sevastopol on 17 June 1855 and received a severe wound on 23 August 1855. He was appointed a Companion of the Order of the Bath (CB), later advanced to become a Knight Commander of the Order of the Bath (KCB) and eventually made a Knight Grand Cross of the Order of the Bath (GCB) in May 1894.

Arbuthnot went to India in 1868, and was actively employed in the Anglo-Afghan War. In his personal life, he married Caroline Charlotte Clarke on 27 October 1868. She had been born in Barbados in 1845–6, where her father, William Clarke, was a doctor.

On his return to England in 1880, Arbuthnot was appointed deputy adjutant-general of artillery, then inspector-general of artillery, and finally president of the ordinance committee. According to his entry in the Dictionary of National Biography, "his firmness and justice made him a highly respected administrator".

Arbuthnot returned to India in 1886, to serve from February as Commander-in-Chief of the Bombay Army and then from December as Commander-in-Chief of the Madras Army. He served as senior military adviser for the Madras Presidency until 1890. He was appointed Colonel Commandant, Royal Artillery in 1893.

== Later life ==
Arbuthnot died on 14 April 1899, survived by his wife and children. One son, Alexander George Arbuthnot (died 3 May 1961), served with the Field Artillery, rising to the rank of brigadier general. A grandson, Charles Crombie, was a decorated flying ace of the Second World War.

== Sources ==
- London Gazette (2 November 1855), (4 May 1880), (2 Sept 1887) as cited in DNB
- J. R. J. Jocelyn, History of the Royal Artillery (1911) as cited in DNB
- The Times (18 April 1899) as cited in DNB
- Mrs P S-M Arbuthnot Memories of the Arbuthnots (1920). George Allen & Unwin Ltd.

Military offices
Preceded by Sir Arthur Hardinge	C-in-C, Bombay Army; 1886	Succeeded by The Duke of Connaught
Preceded by Sir Herbert Macpherson	C-in-C, Madras Army; 1886–1891	Succeeded by Sir James Dormer
