= Arbuthnot (surname) =

Arbuthnot or Arbuthnott is a Scottish surname, deriving from the village in Scotland from where members of the Arbuthnot family originated.

== People with the surname Arbuthnot or Arbuthnott ==
- Arbuthnot baronets
- Viscount of Arbuthnott
- Alexander Arbuthnot (disambiguation), several people
- Barbara Arbuthnott (1822–1904), Scottish chicken breeder and benefactor
- Betty Carnegy-Arbuthnott (1906–1985), British fencer
- Charles Arbuthnot (disambiguation), several people
- Eric Arbuthnot, South African cricketer
- Forster Fitzgerald Arbuthnot (1833–1901), British Orientalist and translator
- Geoffrey Arbuthnot (1885–1957), British naval officer during World War I, later Fourth Sea Lord
- George Arbuthnot (disambiguation), several people
- Gerald Arbuthnot (1872–1916), British soldier and politician, MP from Burnley
- Harriet Arbuthnot (1793–1834), English diarist, social observer, and political hostess
- Hugh Arbuthnot (disambiguation), several people
- James Arbuthnot (born 1952), British politician and MP
- James George Arbuthnot, American wrestling coach of the Oregon State Beavers
- John Arbuthnot (disambiguation), several people
- Keith Arbuthnot (disambiguation), several people
- Lionel Gough Arbuthnot, English cricketer
- Malcolm Arbuthnot (1877–1967), British pictorialist photographer and artist
- Mariot Arbuthnot (1711–1794), British admiral during the American Revolutionary war
- May Hill Arbuthnot (1884–1969), American educator, writer, and editor
- Michael Arbuthnot, American archaeologist and film-maker
- Reginald Arbuthnot, English cricketer
- Robert Arbuthnot (disambiguation), several people
- Thomas Arbuthnot (disambiguation), several people
- William Arbuthnot (disambiguation), several people

== Fictional characters ==
- Sandy Arbuthnot, in the Richard Hannay book series by John Buchan
- Colonel John Arbuthnot, in Murder on the Orient Express by Agatha Christie
- Freddie Arbuthnot, in the Bertie Wooster stories of P. G. Wodehouse
- James Charles Arbuthnot, in the novel A Graveyard for Lunatics by Ray Bradbury
- Mrs. Arbuthnot, in the play A Woman of No Importance by Oscar Wilde
- Frederick Arbuthnot, in the book The Enchanted April by Elizabeth von Arnim
- Mrs. Arbuthnot, in the movie Mrs. Palfrey at the Claremont by Dan Ireland, based on the novel by Elizabeth Taylor
- Freddy Arbuthnot, in Lord Peter Wimsey stories by Dorothy L. Sayers
- Fredericka "Freddy" Arbuthnot, in several books by Gregory Mcdonald
- Lois Arbuthnot, in the novel Peace by Gene Wolfe
