= Arbuthnot =

Arbuthnot or Arbuthnott /ɑːrˈbʌθnɒt/ may refer to:

== People ==
- Michael Arbuthnot Ashcroft, British codebreaker during WW2
- Arbuthnot (surname), Scottish surname (and people with that name)

== Places ==
- Arbuthnot, Saskatchewan, Canada
- Arbuthnott, Scotland
- Arbuthnot Lake, a lake on Mount Baker in Washington state, U.S.
- Arbuthnot Road, Hong Kong

== Other uses ==
- Arbuthnot & Co, former British bank in India during the 19th century
- Arbuthnot (schooner), British ship during the American Revolutionary War
- Arbuthnot and Ambrister incident, 1818 incident involving men tried for aiding hostile Indians in Florida, USA
- Arbuthnot Latham & Co, British merchant bank
- "Epistle to Dr Arbuthnot", poem by Alexander Pope addressed to John Arbuthnot

== See also ==
- Arbuthnot (ship)
- Category: Arbuthnot family
