= Arbuthnot (ship) =

Various ships have had the name Arbuthnot:

- HM galley Arbuthnot (1780) served the British Royal Navy between 1780–1786
- Arbuthnot (schooner), at least four schooners operating during the American War of Independence
- Arbuthnot (steamship), a 41-ton steam ship that burnt out Murray River, Australia, in 1913
- Alexander Arbuthnot (paddle steamer), paddle steamer, built in 1923
- Thomas Arbuthnot (ship), a fast sailing ship, constructed in 1841
