= Thomas Bassendyne =

Thomas Bassendyne (died 1577), also Bassandyne or Bassinden, was the printer of the earliest translation of the New Testament published in Scotland.

== Background ==
Bassendyne was trained in Antwerp, Paris and Leiden, returning to Scotland in 1558.

Bassendyne carried on the business of a printer, conjointly with that of bookbinder and bookseller, at Nether Bow, Edinburgh. There is a tradition that he at one time occupied the house still pointed out as that of John Knox, and support was claimed for the tradition from the fact that Society Close in the neighbourhood was formerly called Bassendyne's Close. This, however, is sufficiently accounted for by the fact that Bassendyne occupied a tenement at the Nether Bow on the south side of the High Street, nearly opposite Knox's house.

The exact site of the building is placed beyond doubt by the evidence of George Dalgleish in reference to the murder of Darnley: "efter they enterit within the [Nether Bow] Port, thai zeid up abone Bassyntine's house, on the south side of the gait". The tall narrow tenement which now occupies this site is of later date than the time of Bassendyne, although some of the rooms in the back part may have been occupied by him. In 1568 Bassendyne was enjoined by the general assembly of the ‘kirk’ to call in two books printed by him: 'The Fall of the Roman Kirk,’ in which the king is called 'supreme head of the primitive kirk,’ and a 'Psalme Booke,’ with a 'bawdy song,’ 'Welcome Fortune,’ &c., printed at the end of it.

== King's Printer ==
It would seem that Bassendyne held the office of king's printer, for in 1573 he printed 'The King's Majesty's Proclamation beiring the verie occasion of the present incumming of the English forces, with his hienes commandement for their gude treatment and friendly usage.' In 1574, while 'dwelland at the Nether Bow,’ he printed his beautiful edition of the works of Sir David Lindsay, 'newly correctit and vindicated from the former errours.' Along with Alexander Arbuthnot, merchant of Edinburgh, he, in March 1575, presented to the assembly certain articles for the printing of an English bible. The license to print was obtained from the privy council in July following, an obligation being entered into to have the book ready within nine months.

That Bassendyne alone had the practical charge of the printing is evident from an order of the privy council, ordaining him to fulfil his agreement with a compositor he had brought from Flanders, in which he is styled 'maister of the said werk'; and another enjoining him to deliver to Arbuthnot 'with all possible diligence the werk of the Bybill ellis printed'. It was therefore probably owing to undue dilatoriness on the part of Bassendyne that the complete Bible was not published till 1579. The New Testament, with his name alone as the printer, appeared in 1576.

== Family and Passing ==
Bassendyne died 3 October 1577, before the work was completed. Among the debts mentioned as owing him in his will is a sum of 400l. from Arbuthnot. From the list of his stock given in his will it would appear that he carried on a very extensive bookselling business. He was married to Katherine Norvell, who afterwards married Robert Smith, bookseller, and died in 1593. He had no sons, but in his widow's will a daughter, Alesoun Bassendyne, is mentioned.
