= Alexander Arbuthnot =

Alexander Arbuthnot may refer to:

- Alexander Arbuthnot (poet) (1538–1583), Scottish poet and principal of King's College, Aberdeen
- Alexander Arbuthnot (printer) (died 1585), printer in Edinburgh, Scotland
- Alexander Arbuthnot (politician) (1654–1705), Scottish politician
- Alexander Arbuthnot (Baron of Exchequer) (1674–1721), a.k.a. Alexander Maitland, Scottish politician
- Alexander Arbuthnot (bishop) (1768–1828), Irish Bishop of Killaloe
- Alexander Dundas Young Arbuthnott (1789–1871), British naval officer
- Alexander John Arbuthnot (1822–1907), British official and writer

== Other ==
- Alexander Arbuthnot (paddle steamer) (built 1923), the last paddle steamer built as a working boat on the Murray River, Australia
- The Arbuthnot and Ambrister incident, in which Robert Ambrister and Alexander George Arbuthnot were hanged by Andrew Jackson
- Sandy Arbuthnot, Lord Clanroyden, John Buchan character

== See also ==
- Arbuthnot (surname)
