= PV Coonawarra =

Paddle vessel used in Australia

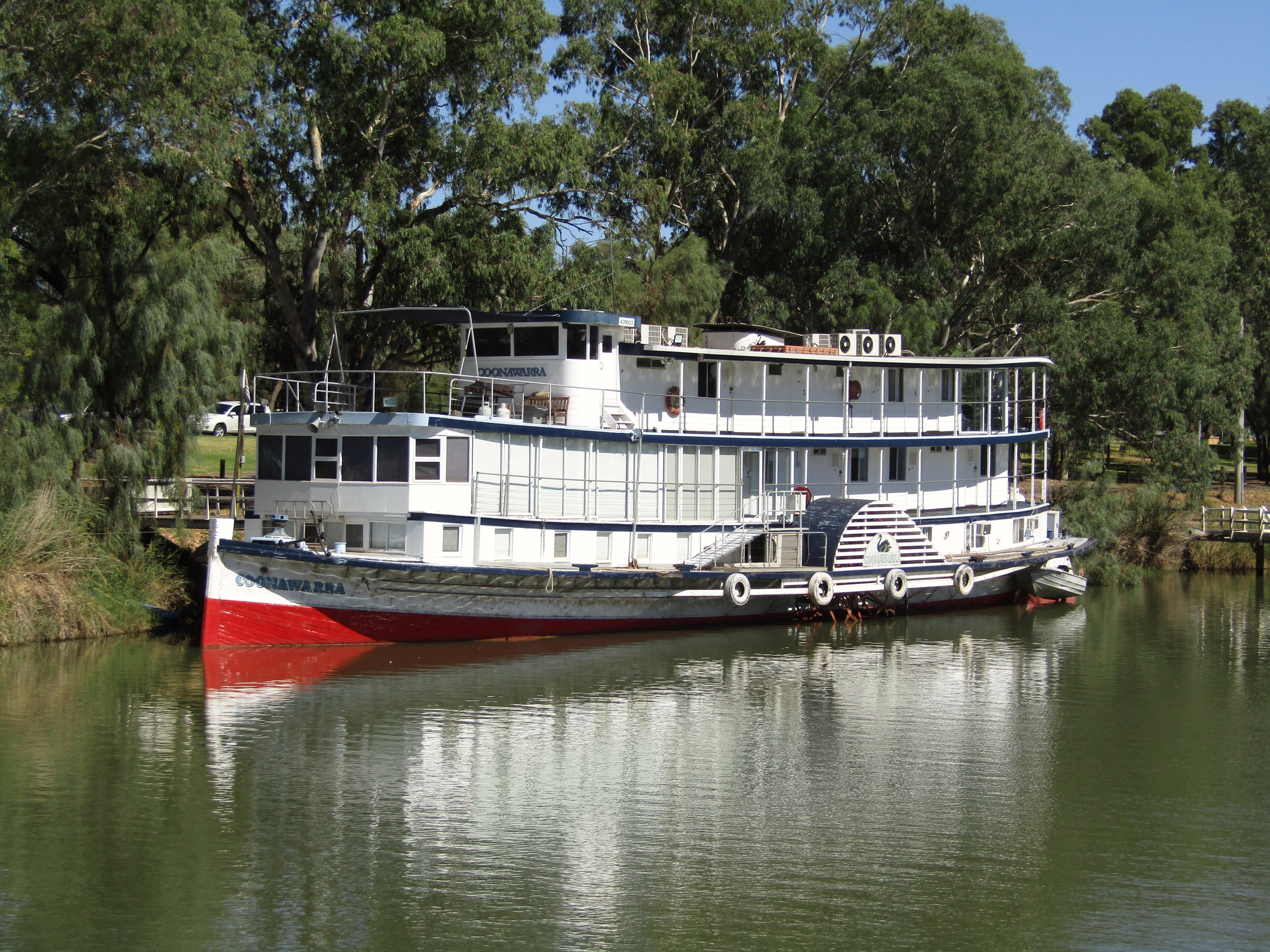
- Coonawarra laid-up (2019)

History

Australia
- Name: PV Coonawarra
- Route: Murray River
- Builder: Charlie Felshow
- Launched: 15 September 1949
- Maiden voyage: 12 October 1950
- Homeport: Echuca, Victoria; (1950–1953); Murray Bridge, South Australia; (1953–1981); Mildura, Victoria; (1981–)
- Identification: 177216
- Status: Tourist vessel

General characteristics
- Class & type: Side paddle wheeler
- Length: 111 ft 6 in (34.0 m)
- Beam: 22 ft 4 in (6.8 m)
- Depth of hold: 8 ft 6 in (2.6 m)
- Propulsion: Diesel

PV Coonawarra is a diesel-powered paddle vessel that operated as a tourist vessel on the Murray River. Built in Echuca in 1950 from the barge J L Roberts (itself built in 1894), the Coonawarra was intended by owners Murray Valley Coaches Ltd to replace the tourist vessel PS Murrumbidgee, which burnt beyond repair in 1948. The Coonawarra is currently moored in Midlura, overlooking the weir and wharf, operating as a floating motel.

== History ==
=== Prior to Launch (1894–1949) ===
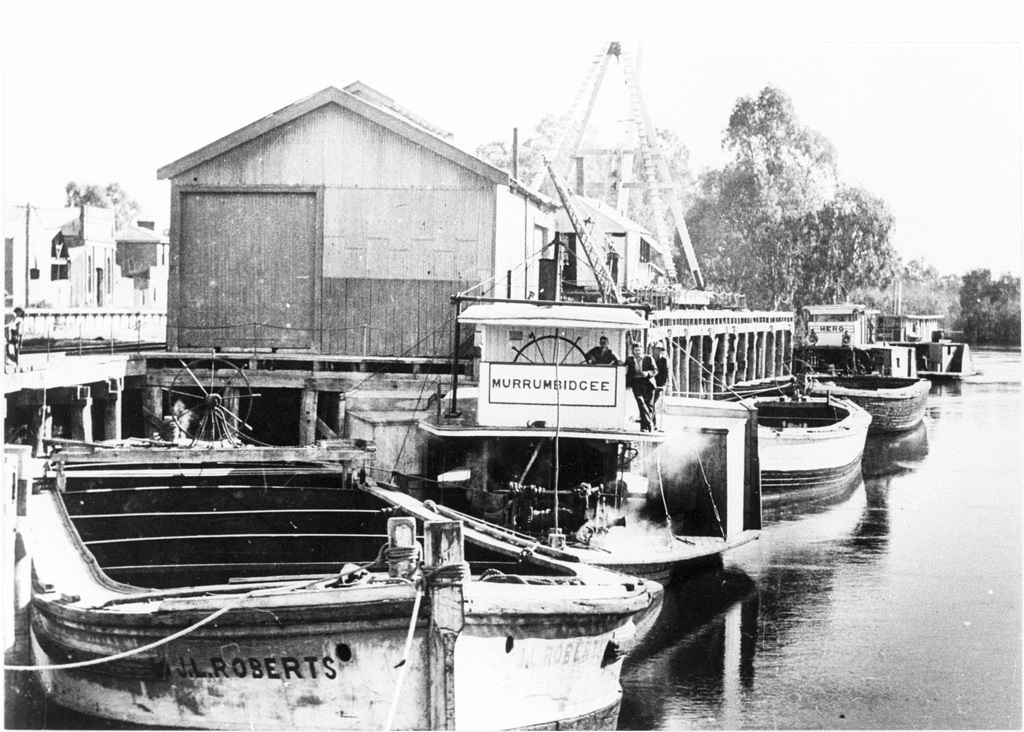
J L Roberts barge and PS Murrumbidgee at Echuca Wharf (c. 1942)[PRG 1258/1/2802]

The J L Roberts barge was built in Echuca in 1894 for Permewan, Wright & Co Ltd, and was later sold to Murray Shipping Ltd. She was used for transport of wool and general goods along the Murray, Darling, and Murrumbidgee Rivers, being towed behind paddle steamers such as PS Maggie, PS Pride of the Murray, and PS Goldsbrough.

In the 1930s, the J L Roberts barge was purchased, along with the PS Murrumbidgee, by Captain Spencer "Spinny" Clarke. Both vessels were used for the transportation of sleepers from Yielima to Echuca. The Roberts was also the final barge to be towed down the Murrumbidgee River, behind the PS Murrumbidgee in 1936.

Clarke sold both vessels to Murray Valley Coaches Ltd (MVC) in 1946, with the company utilising the Murrumbidgee as a tourist vessel out of Echuca. On 29 November 1948, the Murrumbidgee caught fire upstream of Echuca after departing on "her usual four-day cruise to [the] Barmah Lakes", and was burned beyond repair some three miles north of the junction of the Murray and Goulburn rivers.

The J L Roberts was inspected by a marine architect after being slipped January 18, 1949. On 3 March 1949, MVC general manager H J Lawrence announced the plans for a Murrumbidgee II to be built at Evans Bros' slipway in Echuca, through the conversion of the J L Roberts barge. Details of the planned vessel were released, describing that "the lower deck [would] include a dining room, a spacious lounge complete with piano and, other amenities; [while] the upper deck [would] have accommodation for fifty passengers in two berth cabins". The new vessel was designed by naval architect Charles Mackinnon, with shipwright Charlie Felshow overseeing construction. The unnamed vessel was launched to a small crowd on September 15, 1949, and was expected to be towed by the PS Edwards to the Echuca Wharf the following Monday for installation of the paddlewheels and diesel engines.

=== Life as a passenger steamer (1950–) ===
The PV Coonawarra was officially commissioned, in Echuca, on 9 October 1950 by F M Osborne (representing the Minister for Shipping), with Captain Hilary Hogg taking the vessel to the Campaspe junction and back in preparation for the paddle boat's maiden voyage to Barmah the following Thursday. The name "Coonawarra", an Aboriginal term meaning "black swan", was chosen following a nation-wide competition attracting some 10,000 entries. By 1952, the Coonawarra was skippered by Rowley McGraw, with Barney Binks (former captain of the PS Adelaide) as his second-in-command. Between the boat's commission and October 1953, she carried some 5,000 passengers from across the country.

In 1953, due to a planned lowering of river levels, the Coonawarra left Echuca for Renmark, planning to operate from its new home for at least two years. At the time, it was the first passenger paddle vessel to travel from Echuca to Mildura since August 1937. She berthed at Renmark on November 16, following which she undertook a weekly run to Waikerie and back. The Coonawarra again relocated to Mildura in November of 1954, to operate weekly trips between Mildura and Renmark, in hoping to "re-capture the NSW trade", noting the lack of interest in a new river boat in South Australia.

By the 1960s, the Coonawarra was operating out of Murray Bridge, conducting trips to Blanchetown, and later 5-day return cruises to Morgan, which continued into the 1970s. In 1981, the PV Coonawarra was purchased by Alby Pointon, returning to Mildura, where she remains to the present day. By 1986, the vessel had resumed regular weekend, three-day, and five-day cruises, accommodating up to 42 passengers. In 1988, while at Goolwa, South Australia, the Coonawarra competed in a paddleboat race against the PS Rothbury, PS Mayflower, PS Impulse, and PV Murray River Queen, finishing in third place. The vessel made a brief return to Echuca in 1990, as part of its 40th anniversary cruise.

Today, the Coonawarra is privately owned, moored in Mildura overlooking the wharf and weir. As a static motel, she boasts 16 air-conditioned cabins, each with an ensuite.

== Particulars ==
The Coonawarra is powered by twin diesel engines, allowing to 'split' the directions of the paddle wheels.

The 15ft paddle wheels of the Coonawarra were sourced from the wreck of the PS Excelsior, while the paddle shaft was sourced from the burnt wreck of the PS Murrumbidgee.
