= PS Emmylou =

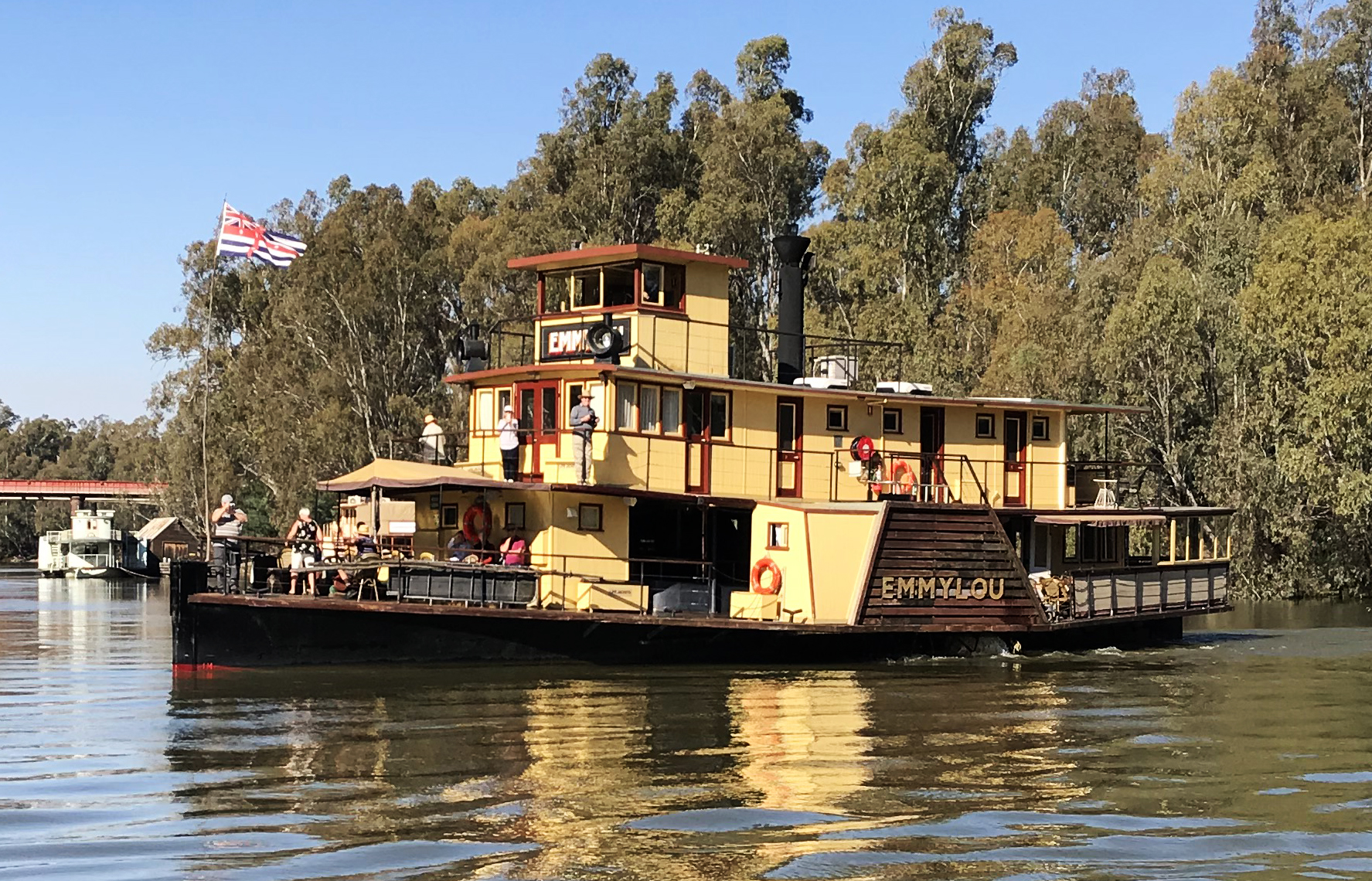
- P.S Emmylou

History

Australia
- Name: PS Emmylou
- Namesake: Emmylou Harris
- Owner: BFER Pty Ltd (Tony & Genny Nunan)
- Operator: Murray River Paddlesteamers 36°07′13″S 144°44′48″E
- Port of registry: Sydney, New South Wales
- Route: River Murray, Australia
- Ordered: 1980
- Builder: H. Collvile
- Laid down: June 1980
- Launched: 20 Sept 1982
- Home port: Echuca, Victoria (Australia)
- Nickname(s): The Emmy
- Status: Tourist vessel

General characteristics
- Class & type: Paddle steamer
- Length: 100 ft (30.5 m)
- Beam: 10 m
- Depth: 1.77m
- Speed: 12 km/h (Engine at 120 rpm, Paddle wheels at 75 rpm)
- Notes: Data compiled from several sources

PS Emmylou is a paddle steamer operated by Murray River Paddlesteamers in Echuca, used for both day and overnight accommodation cruises.

== History ==
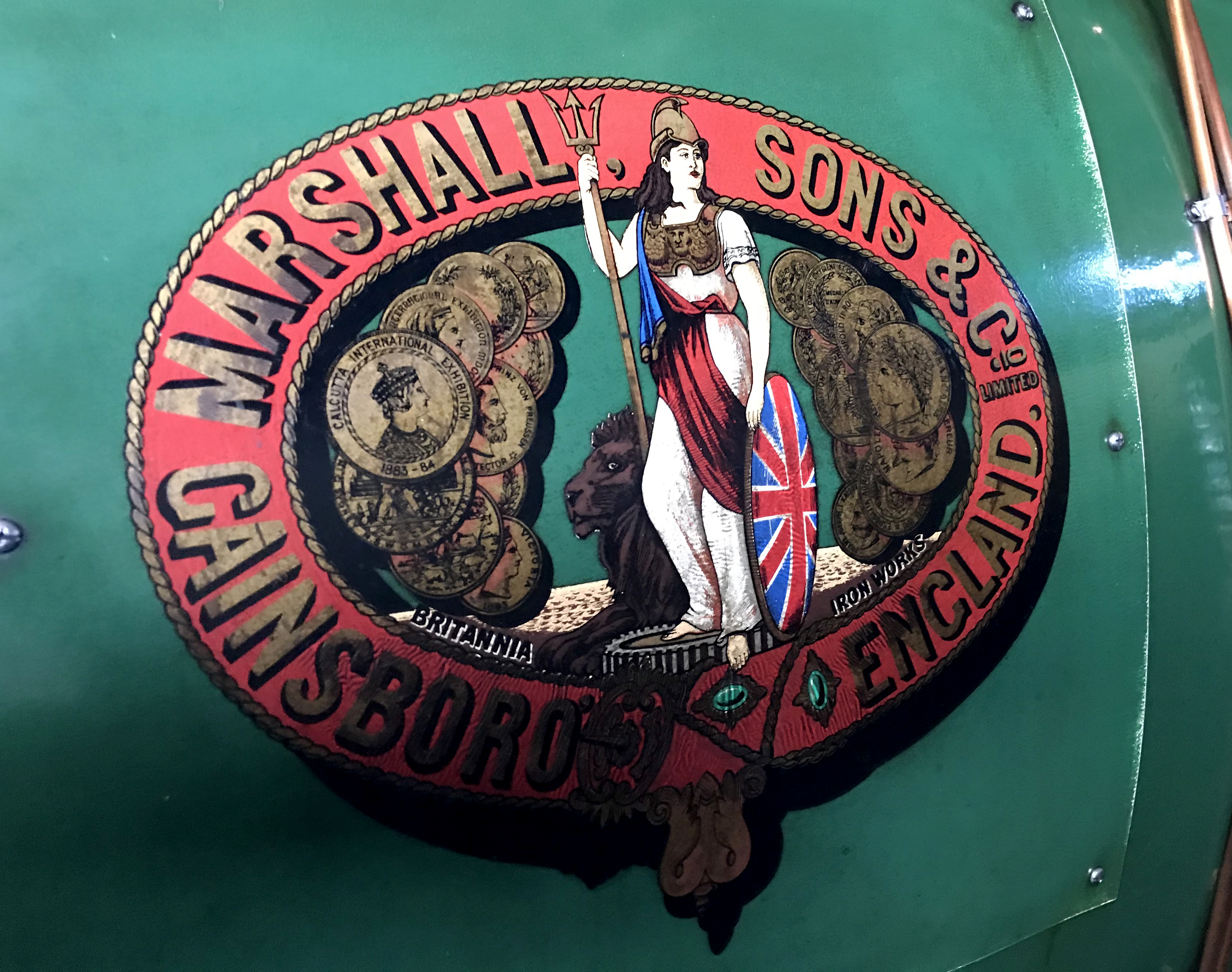
The Marshall, Sons & Co. badge displayed on the 1906 steam engine of the PS Emmylou

Built in 1980 and named after the country singer Emmylou Harris, the PS Emmylou has been host to thousands of people, delighting even her namesake during the late 1980s. Alongside the PS Pevensey, the PS Emmylou starred in the TV series All the Rivers Run, in which she was renamed the PS Providence.

Built in an effort to pay tribute to the steam powered vessels of the Murray before her, the Emmylou began life as three lengths of steel in a shed at Barham, in 1980. Designed by naval architects Warwick Hood, and Glen Davis, the boat's characteristics were loosely based on the hull of the PS Pyap, the engine-room of the PS Melbourne, the main deck-house of the PS Pevensey and the PS Industry, and the wheel-house of the PS Adelaide. Following a three-month search expedition, a 1906 Marshall, Sons & Co. portable steam engine was located in a shed at the old Moulamein Timber Mill. The Emmylou was the first steam-driven overnight paddle steamer to be launched since the PS Ruby's maiden voyage in 1907.

When launched in 1982 by owner Anthony Browell, the PS Emmylou could comfortably accommodate 16 overnight passengers in twin stacked berth cabins (that included basins) and offered shared showers and bathrooms. She boasted modern features, such as two sundecks, "full stereo sound system, television, VHS video tape, air-conditioning, taped movies, and some games".

By 1984, the PS Emmylou was under new ownership and had been refurbished to include an additional two cabins, enabling her to host up to 20 overnight passengers.

== Cabins of the PS Emmylou ==
Adapted from PS Emmylou: The Murray River Guide
Cabin number	Name	Details
1	The Emmylou Suite	The premier suite of the PS Emmylou, named after the vessel herself. Added following the 2018 renovations, becoming the largest cabin of the boat.
2	The Murrumbidgee Cabin	Named after the PS Murrumbidgee, built in 1865 as a general cargo steamer. Became a tourist steamer in 1947, accommodating for up to seventeen guests. Destroyed by fire in 1948 (remnants can be seen adjacent to the Echuca Wharf).
3	The Shannon Cabin	Named for the PS Shannon, built in Goolwa, South Australia in 1877. Originally a two-deck cargo steamer on the Murray, she operated from Mildura for many years. In 1904, she was sold to work on the Tamar River in Tasmania, though after only 18 months she was sold back to Victorian interests, and was wrecked during her return voyage across the Bass Strait.
4	The Gem Cabin	Named for the first 'Queen of the Murray', the PS Gem. Built in Moama in 1876 at a length of 92 ft, in 1882 she was shortened in Goolwa by 40 ft. One of the largest and most luxurious paddle steamers, she operated passenger trips on the Murray until 1953. She was towed to Swan Hill by the PS Oscar W in 1962 to become a static display in the Pioneer Settlement.
5	The Corowa Cabin	The SWPS Corowa is the namesake of The Corowa Cabin, launched in 1868 to replace the SWPS Lady Darling. She later had a third deck added to increase accommodation capacity. It was stripped in 1930, and sunk in 1945.
6	The Pearl Cabin	Named after the SWPS Pearl, a stern-wheeler paddle steamer built in 1890 in Mildura. While fast and popular, she was unsuited to the river system of the Murray Darling Basin. The Pearl was converted to a barge in 1901, and sunk between 1957 and 1958 at Murray Bridge.
7	The Ellen Cabin	The PS Ellen, the namesake of The Ellen Cabin, was built at Goolwa in 1877. Originally one of the largest vessels operating on the Murray, she was altered between 1911 and 1912 to increase accommodation space. Following retirement in 1925, the Ellen was destroyed by fire in 1930.
8	The Maggie Cabin	Named for the PS Maggie, built in Echuca in 1881, used as a passenger steamer to Swan Hill (until 1920). She briedly offered excursion cruises from Mildura, before being retired in 1937.

== Modern day ==
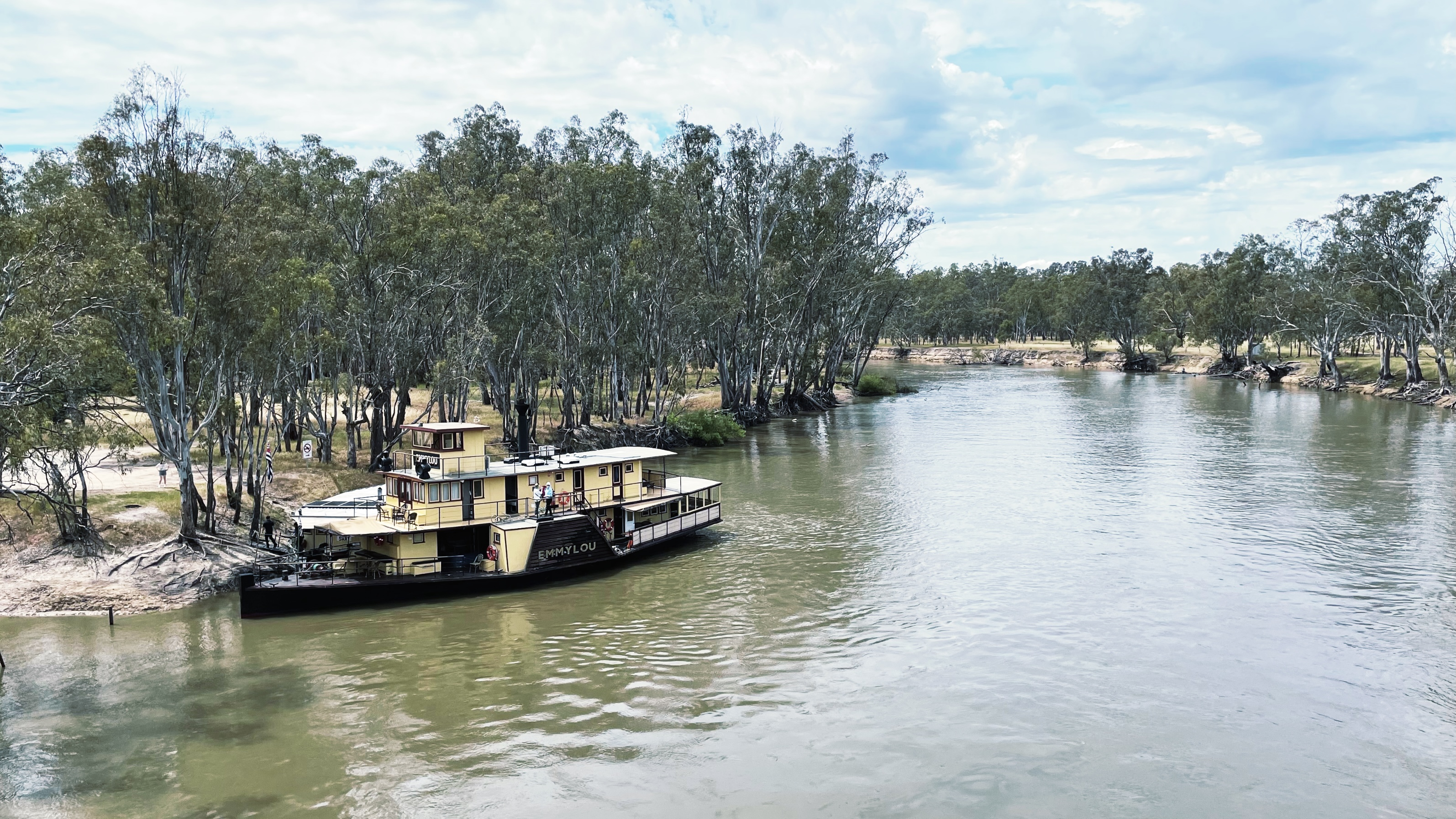
PS Emmylou moored at Barmah, Victoria in 2021

The PS Emmylou, like The Pride of the Murray and PS Canberra, operates as a tourist attraction in Echuca operated by Murray River Paddlesteamers. It is one of the most recognisable and iconic Paddlesteamers in Australia. The Emmylou is now the only wood fired paddlesteamer in the world offering regular scheduled accommodated river cruises.

The Emmylou was relaunched in September 2018 following a $500,000 renovation, becoming Australia's most luxurious boutique inland river cruiser when her cabins were refitted to a luxury standard with ensuites; including the new premier 'Emmylou Suite'. Guests are offered the opportunity to step back in time and let the Emmylou connect them to Australian history, geography, culture and cuisine. Passengers on accommodated cruises enjoy riverside campfires, BBQ's, winery visits, world heritage wetlands and cultural experience, all whilst enjoying the sights and sounds of Australia's most famous river.

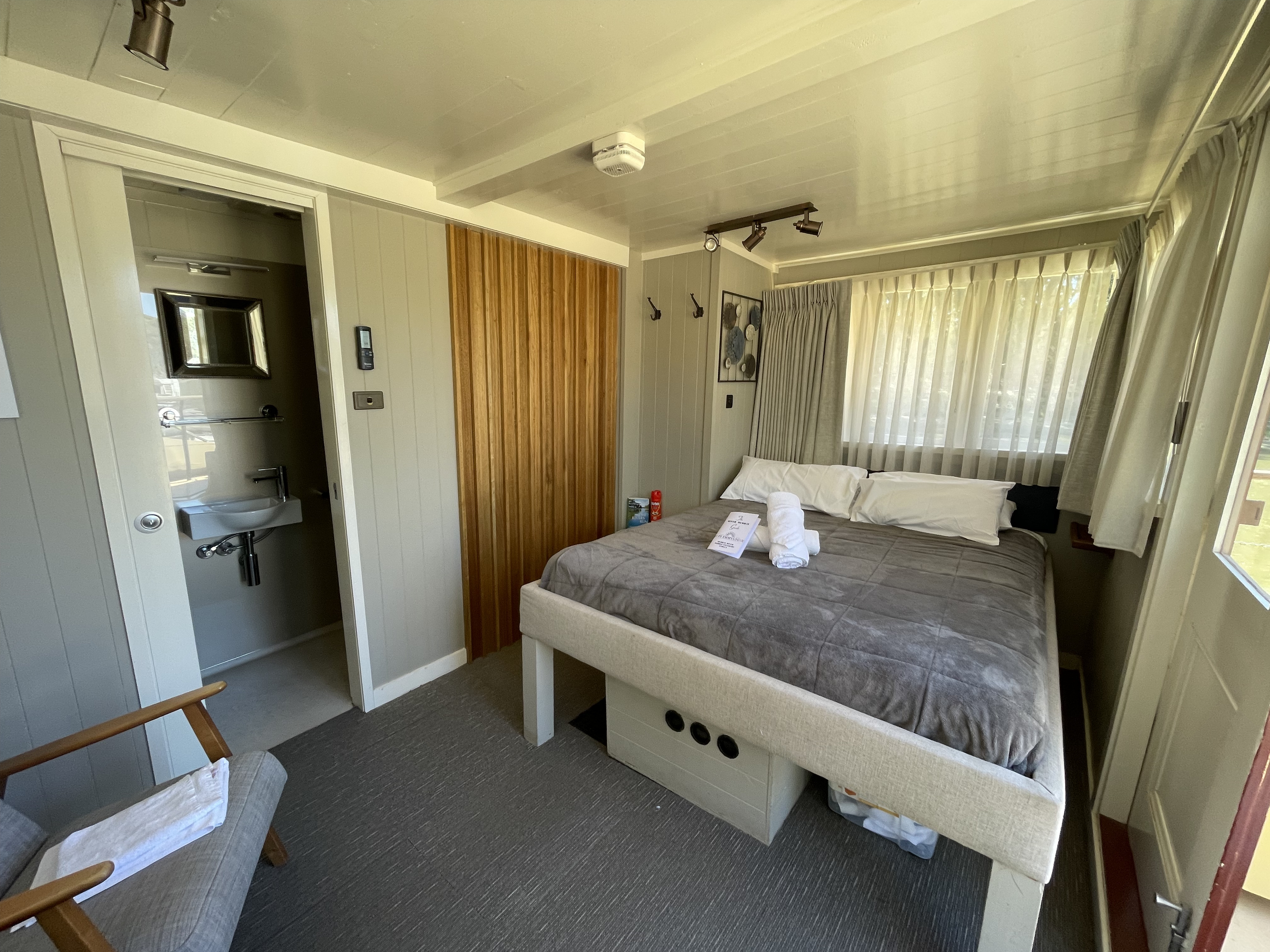
The Emmylou Suite, the premier cabin of the PS Emmylou

The Emmylou also operates on select weekends to undertake normal sightseeing, lunch, and dinner cruises, and is also available for weddings, corporate functions and private events subject to availability. When available, Redgums on the PS Emmylou offer a 3 course luncheon with a selection of mains and desserts, while the Evening Steaming offers a 5 course dinner including three selection of main, while accompanied by a 3-hour cruise.

== Particulars ==
The PS Emmylou is powered by a restored 1906 wood-fired Marshall, Sons & Co. 2-cylinder double acting horizontal steam engine, which was dismantled, restored and modified prior to installation. She operates on approximately one tonne of wood per day, while consuming an average of 250 litres of water per day.

== Future ==
The current market of the PS Emmylou is planned to be accompanied by the PS Australian Star. The vessel is planned to include the "Hopwood bar and lounge" offering sweeping river vistas, a fine-dining restaurant called the "Randell dining room" (also referred to as the saloon) multiple outdoor relaxation areas, MRPS's first elevator for easy access to all levels, and 19 plush and modern staterooms, all opening to a deck and offering an ensuite". The PS Australian Star is planned to be operating in 2025.The paddlesteamer is planned to be powered by an energy-efficient, hybrid diesel electric/steam propulsion system featuring a vintage, refurbished 1907 Richard Garrett and Sons wood-fired steam engine
