= PS Adelaide =

Wooden paddle steamer

Coordinates: 36.120868°S 144.74735°E

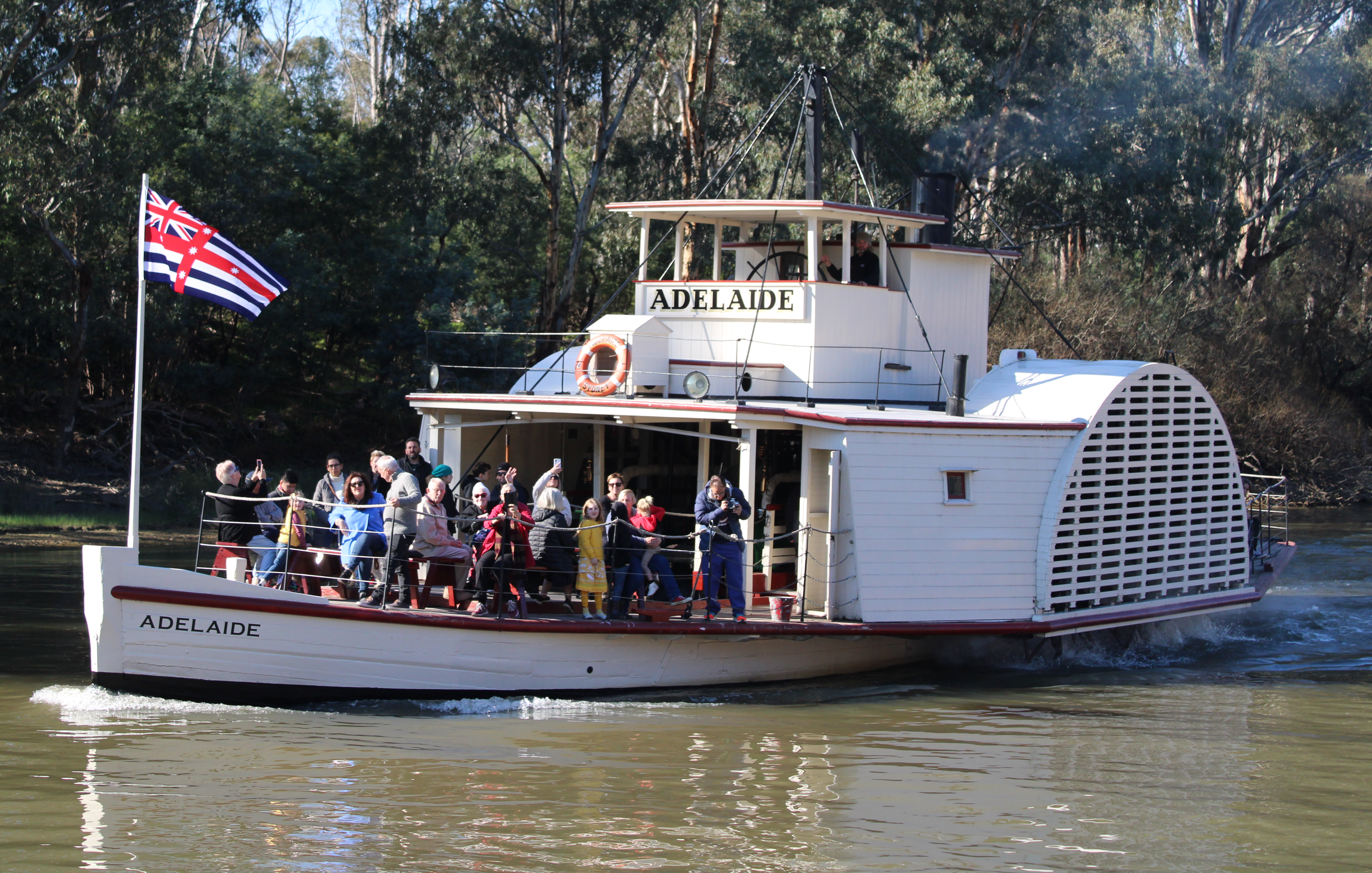
- PS Adelaide (July 2021)

History

Australia
- Name: Adelaide
- Owner: J.C. Grassey and Partners(first owners)
- Route: Murray River, Australia
- Builder: George Linklater
- Laid down: 1866
- Home port: Echuca, Victoria (Australia)
- Status: Tourist vessel

General characteristics
- Class & type: Paddle steamer
- Length: 75 ft 9.5 in (23.10 m)
- Beam: 17 ft 0.7 in (5.20 m)
- Draught: 2 ft 4 in (0.71 m)
- Propulsion: Steam
- Notes: Data compiled from several sources

PS Adelaide is the oldest wooden hulled paddle steamer still operating anywhere in the world. (Hjejlen from Denmark is older and has sailed since 1861. It is the world's oldest original coal-fired paddle steamer). It is now moored at the Echuca Wharf and used for special occasions.

== History ==
=== Early life ===
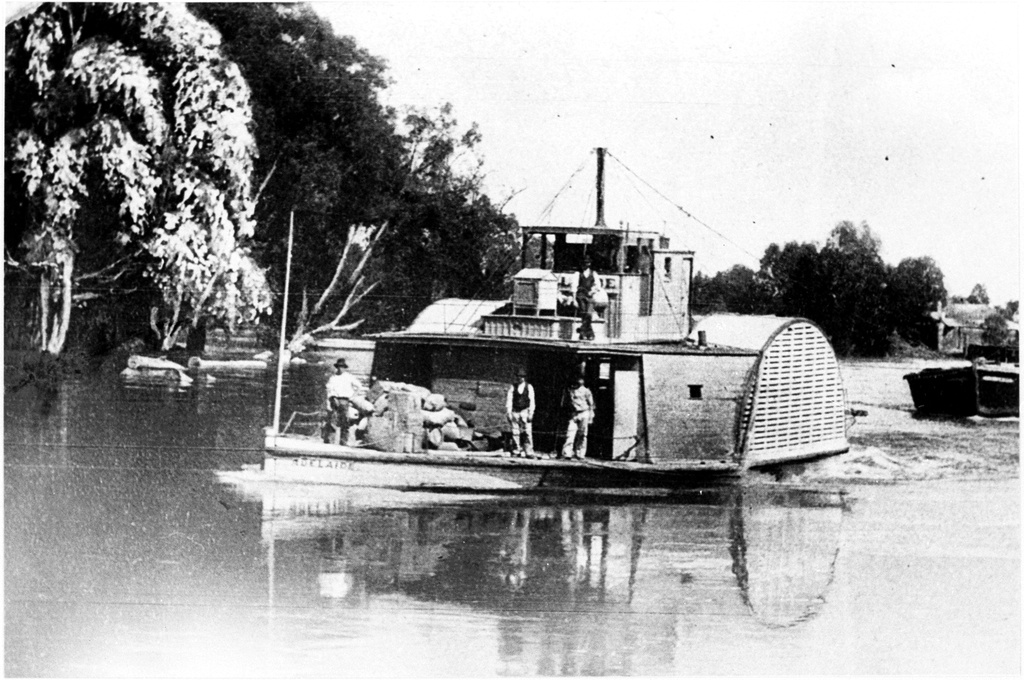
The PS Adelaide (c 1890)

PS Adelaide was built by George Linklater at Echuca in 1866 for J.C. Grassey and Partners. It was used by the original owners to transport wool to Echuca from nearby sheep stations. It was also a part-time passenger boat, bringing the ladies into town to do their shopping. The Adelaide was purchased by the Murray River Sawmill Co in 1891 (from D Blair, at a cost of ten shillings per each of his 64 shares), and used as logging steamer.

Capt. William Thompson served as skipper of the PS Adelaide from 1890 to 1912, prior to succession to foreman at the Murray River Sawmills. Capt. Charles 'Swan' Anderson (1871–1942) served as captain of the Adelaide from 1912 to 1939 (once captain of the PS Melbourne). In 1938, it cost £9 10p to hire the vessel. Employees of the Murray River Sawmills were employed on board a steamer for a season of five to six months a year, and within the mill for the remainder of the year.

=== 1900s ===
From 1900, the Murray River Sawmill adopted the practice of name their barges by ordinal letter and number of year built. This resulted in the construction of the A11, B22, C24 (later the PV Pride of the Murray), and D26 barges. When sold to Paringa in 1958, the PS Adelaide towed Barges A11 and B22 to Mildura (the A11 was eaten by white ants, and sank to the bottom of the Murray River where it remains).

The PS Adelaide was modified several times during her first seventy years; the deckhouses were rebuilt twice, the hull was replanked twice, and in 1924 the paddleboxes were converted to a more conventional square design. Adelaide operated as a logging steamer until 1958, before being sold to the South Australia Sawmill Company and leaving Echuca for Paringa. The Adelaide left Echuca on Wednesday 24 September 1958, headed for Paringa, near Renmark, South Australia. The purchasers, A B Rowe and Sons, intended to use the vessel in connection with a mill they planned to establish near Paringa. The Adelaide (under the command of Capt. Norm Collins) towed two barges laden with firewood for the journey. The vessel's only incident was recorded as a near-miss at Nyah; under darkness the Adelaide only narrowly missed the new bridge upstream of the village.

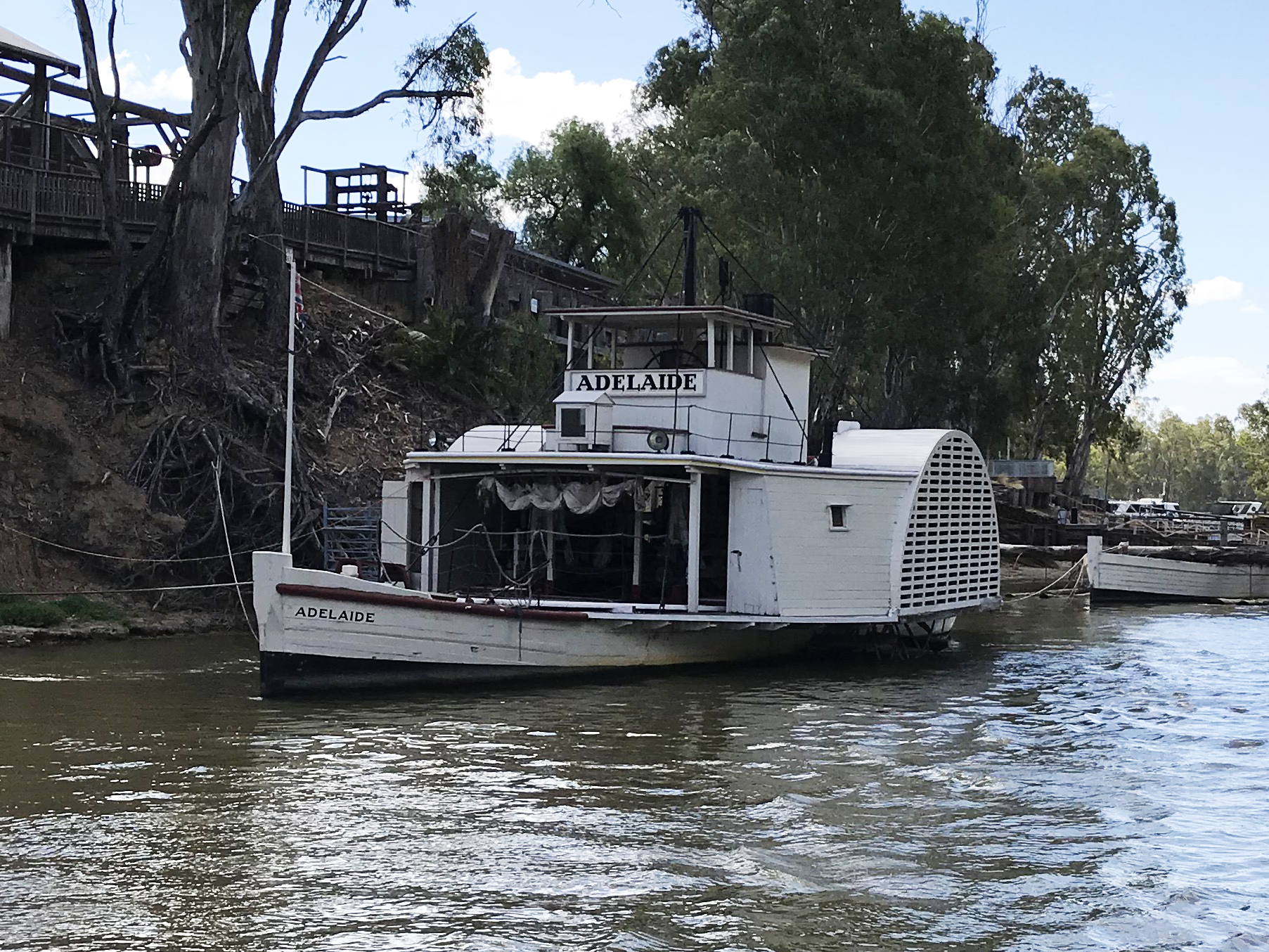
The PS Adelaide laid-up in January 2021

Around 1959, the Echuca Apex Club began the first interest in providing a tangibile sign towards its towns' previous involvement in the steamer and logging industries (signified by the placement of a log buggy in the Hopwood Gardens). The PS Adelaide was purchased by the Echuca Apex Club, with help from the Echuca Historical Society in 1960, the vessel returned to Echuca, beginning her journey from Paringa on Friday 14 October 1960, under the direction of two skippers: Capt Norm Collins (of Mildura) and Capt. Les Telley (of Woorinen). The PS Adelaide made a triumphant return to Echuca on Saturday 29 October 1960 (slightly after two years since departure).

=== Return to Echuca ===
On Saturday 9 May 1964, current Governor of Victoria Sir Rohan Delacombe unveiled a plaque on the site of the PS Adelaide in the presence of some 300 people, celebrating the handing over of the former steamer to Echuca's Mayor, Cr W A Lynch from Barry Beehag (President of Echuca's Apex Club). The Echuca Council guaranteed in June 1981 to preserve the PS Adelaide in the Hopwood Gardens, opposite the Bridge Hotel, Echuca. However, this was soon reversed in 1984 when the council opted to refloat the vessel in the Murray River. In 1980, the Echuca City Council received a $150,000 grant from the State Gold Lottery funds, and restoration works began in December 1980. Work was interrupted in 1983 when shipwright K Hutchinson was seconded to caretake the PS Pevensey during filming of All the Rivers Run. The Adelaide was re-introduced to the waters of the Murray River on Sunday 4 March 1984, at 5:20pm.

By March 1985, the paddleboxes of the vessel had been re-shaped to become semi-circular. At 11:30am on 10 September 1985, the PS Adelaide left her port under her own steam for the first time in 25 years. With restoration completed in 1985, the Adelaide was re-commissioned by the Prince and Princess of Wales. Following four weeks of refurbishment, the PS Adelaide returned from a prolonged hiatus to regular passenger service from the Port of Echuca over the Queen's Birthday long weekend in June 2021.

== Remaining barges ==
=== A11 ===
The A11 barge was the first logging barge built by Murray River Sawmills in 1911. Though originally sunk at Mildura, A11 was raised in 1994 and moved to nearby Bruces Bend.

=== B22 ===
The B22 barge was constructed with a length of 24.9m and a beam 5.1m. Though recovered from Mildura to Echuca in 1980, the barge is considered to be beyond repair (having sunk again in the mid-2010s).

=== C24 ===
The C24 barge sunk at the end of her working life, the C24 rotted and sank into the bank near the Moama slip. In 1972, Max Carrington purchased the wreck for $100, and refloated the vessel (with restoration beginning in 1973). Following renewal of some hull planks, addition of two decks of accommodation, installation of the paddlewheels of the PS Hero, and the addition of a diesel engine, the vessel was launched as the PV Pride of the Murray in 1976. In 2022, the PV Pride of the Murray was purchased by Outback Pioneers and relocated to Longreach, Queensland for cruising on the Thomson River.

=== D26 ===
The fourth barge built by Murray River Sawmills, the D26 barge (built 1926) was saved in 1987, when bought by the Echuca Council at the request of its Shepparton owners. While located at Mooroopna (nearby to Shepparton), the D26 had undergone some restoration work to her hull, though funds nor skill were available to complete her restoration. The D26 was refloated by Kevin Hutchinson in Echuca on Australia Day, 1990.

== Particulars ==
Adelaide was one of the fastest paddles steamers on the Murray River. The original engine of the PS Adelaide is a twin-cylinder 30 horsepower nominal steam engine (featuring 14 inch bore and 36 inch stroke), made by Fulton & Shaw (built in Melbourne, Victoria). The boiler of the Adelaide was replaced twice, the last time in 1936 or 1938. This replacement boiler is a Buchanan & Brock boiler, also built in Melbourne.
