= PS Canberra =

Paddle steamer built in 1912

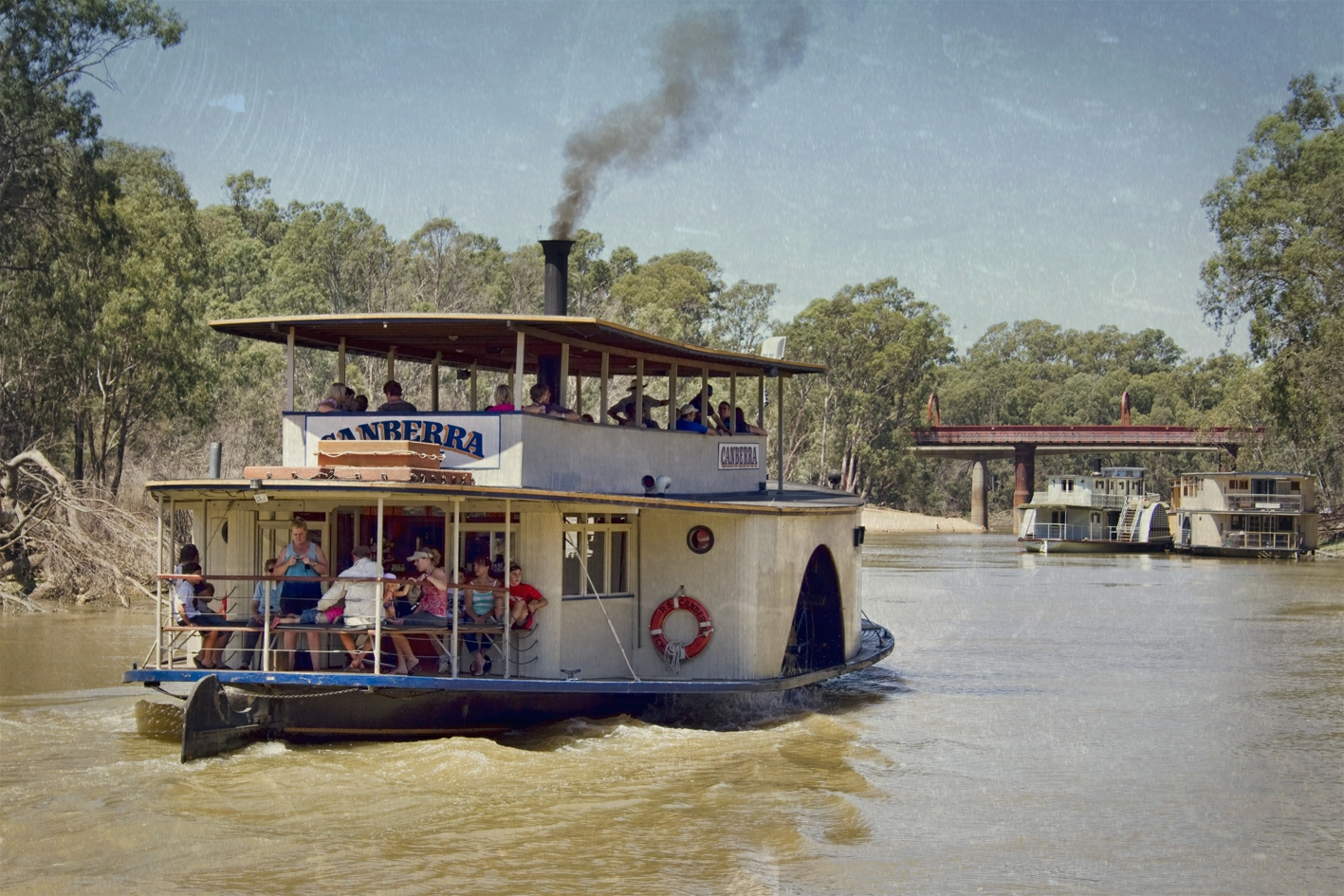
- The PS Canberra on the Murray River

History

Australia
- Name: Canberra
- Owner: BFER Pty Ltd (Tony and Genny Nunan)
- Operator: Murray River Paddlesteamers
- Route: River Murray, Australia
- Ordered: J D Conner
- Builder: David Milne and Son
- Laid down: 1912
- Launched: 1913
- Maiden voyage: 1913
- Home port: Echuca, Victoria (Australia)
- Nickname(s): The Canny
- Status: In active service

General characteristics
- Class & type: Paddle steamer
- Tonnage: 51 gross
- Length: 74 ft (22.6 m)
- Beam: 15 ft (4.6 m)
- Draught: 2 ft (0.6 m)
- Depth of hold: 4 ft (1.2 m)
- Notes: Data compiled from several sources

PS Canberra is an original paddle steamer operated by Murray River Paddlesteamers in Echuca.

== History ==
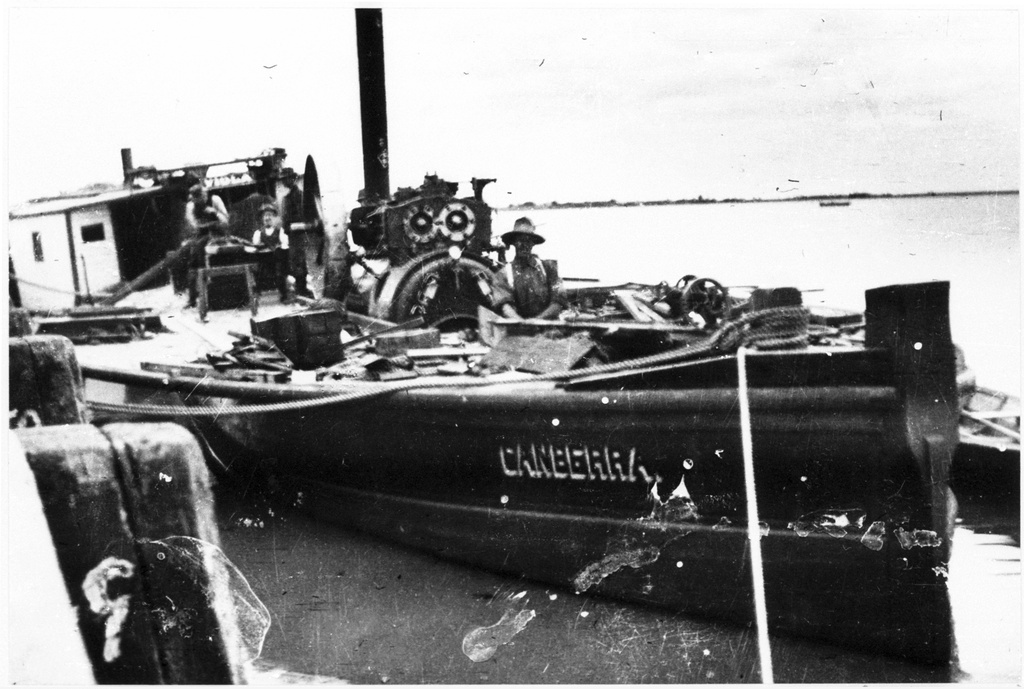
The PS Canberra under construction (c. 1912)

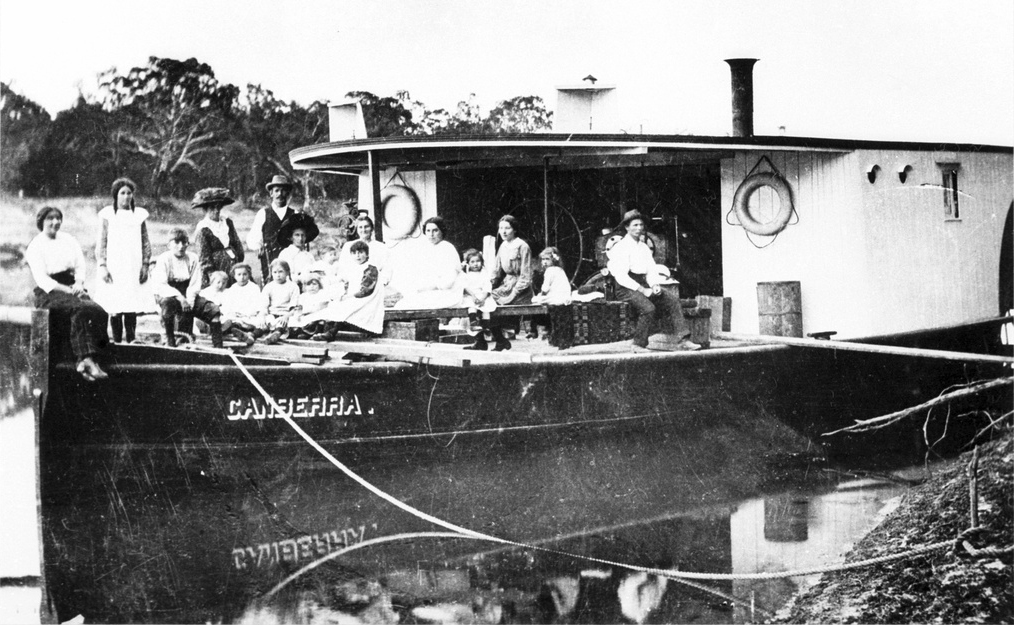
The Conner family on the deck of the PS Canberra during her maiden voyage (1913)

PS Canberra was commissioned to be built in 1912 by the Conner Family, She was built at the mouth of the Murray in Goolwa, South Australia. Originally used as a single deck fishing steamer by the Connor family at Boundary Bend, she was part of their large fishing fleet which consisted of the PS Etona and PS Ranger.

The Canberra was sold to the Collins family in Mildura, in 1945. It was here that the second deck was added and she pioneered the tourist trade.

Former Murray River steamboat captain Charles Frederick William Payne (Captain of the PS Mannum, PS Marion, and PS Gem) noted the Canberra as being "afloat at Mildura, now an excursion boat" in 1947. In May 1951, Governor of Victoria Sir Dallas Brooks cancelled a trip on the PS Canberra, opting instead to play golf after enjoying his experience at the Red Cliffs RSL Centenary Golf tournament the day before.

In January 1953, the PS Canberra was purchased by Captain Hilary Hogg (Royal Australian Navy veteran, formerly of the PS Kookaburra), to operate excursions and charter trips in Renmark. The purchase was proceeded by a series of renovations, painting, and improvements. Governor of South Australia Sir Robert George took his first trip on the Murray River, aboard the PS Canberra, on October 11, 1953.

In 1966, the Echuca Tourist Promotion Council was formed, with one of their earliest projects being to operate a paddleboat for daily excursions. As a result, during the 1960s The PS Canberra and the PS Melbourne were switched; the Canberra steamed to Echuca and the Melbourne to Mildura. The Canberra arrived in Echuca on the afternoon of Saturday, 24 December 1966. Once again the Canberra became a pioneer of tourism. In early 1964, the Canberra's steam engine was described as "spotless in green enamel and polished brass, her shining piston rod and valve gear reciprocating nobly". In 1971, the steam engine was found to be in poor condition, and was considered unworthy of repair. A Perkins Marine Diesel engine was installed, with work completed in November 1971. This engine was connect to the original fitting, giving the unusual impression that the "steam engine was still driving the boat".

The PS Canberra was purchased by the owners of the PS Emmylou and PV Pride of the Murray in 2001. Shortly after Easter 2002, the vessel began a refit on the Moama slip. Much of the original deckhouse was removed, a number of hull planks were removed, and the diesel engine was replaced with a portable 1923 Marshall and Sons portable steam engine. The 'PS Canberra was repainted with a new colour scheme, and resumed regular service in May 2003.

The PS Canberra is the oldest river boat in the Murray River Paddlesteamer fleet, having celebrated her century in August 2013.

== Modern Day ==
Following her purchase in 2001, the Canberra underwent a 9-month restoration during 2002-2003 and was returned to being steam powered once again.

The PS Canberra operates as a tourist attraction in Echuca, running daily hour long journeys.

== Particulars ==
PS Canberra is powered by a 1923 wood-fired Marshall compound steam engine.
