= Thomas Arbuthnot (disambiguation) =

Thomas Arbuthnot (1776–1849) was a British Army commander.

Thomas Arbuthnot may also refer to:

- Thomas Arbuthnot (ship), fast sailing ship
- Thomas Arbuthnott (1911–1995), New Zealand boxer
