= Charles Arbuthnot (disambiguation) =

Charles Arbuthnot may refer to:

- Charles Arbuthnot (1767–1850), British Tory politician and diplomat
- Charles Arbuthnot (abbot) (1737–1820), renowned Scottish abbot
- Sir Charles George Arbuthnot (1824–1899), British lieutenant general
- Charles George James Arbuthnot (1801–1870), British general and MP
- Charles Ramsay Arbuthnot (1850–1913), British admiral
- Charles Mertz Arbuthnot (1852–1920), American physician

== See also ==
- Arbuthnot (disambiguation)
- Charles
