= Keith Arbuthnot =

Keith Arbuthnot may refer to:

- Sir Keith Arbuthnot, 8th Baronet (born 1951)
- Keith Arbuthnott, 15th Viscount of Arbuthnott, Major General, (1897–1966)
