= HM galley Arbuthnot =

HM galley Arbuthnot was a galley of eight guns belonging to the British Royal Navy. Her origins are currently obscure. The Royal Navy commissioned her in October 1780. In 1782 she was under the command of Lieutenant M. Scallion.

He was in command when her crew burned down large portions of Sunbury, Georgia, during the British evacuation in April 1782.

The Royal Navy sold her for £100 in Jamaica in 1786.

The British National Archives holds ship's paybooks and muster lists for Arbuthnot dating from 1780 to 1786.
