= Michael Arbuthnot =

Underwater archaeologist and film-maker

Michael Alexander Arbuthnot (born 9 June 1974) is an archaeologist, instructor and archaeological filmmaker.

== Education and awards ==
Michael A. Arbuthnot received his bachelor's degree in Philosophy and minor in Anthropology from the University of California at Santa Barbara in 1996. He holds a master's degree in Anthropology from Florida State University. He specialized in underwater archaeology and graduated magna cum laude.

Arbuthnot is an active member in many professional organizations, including: the Registry of Professional Archaeologists (RPA); the Florida Archaeological Council (FAC); the Southeastern Archaeological Conference (SEAC); the Florida Anthropological Society (FAS); the American Academy of Underwater Sciences (AAUS); and the St. Augustine Archaeological Association (SAAA).

In addition to being the author of many published articles and papers, Arbuthnot is considered an authority on submerged prehistoric sites. He focused his thesis on paleo-environmental change and the impact it has on archaeological sites in the Gulf of Mexico.

Arbuthnot's research has been presented at many conferences, including the Society for American Archaeology, the Northeast Florida Symposium on Underwater Archaeology, the annual meeting of the Florida Anthropological Society, and the Southeastern Archaeological Conference. The results of his research in the Caribbean are now exhibited at the George Town Museum on Grand Cayman Island.

== Titanic ==
Michael Arbuthnot is currently a faculty member at Flagler College, located in historic downtown St. Augustine, Florida. There, he teaches his students about the fascinating world of archaeology, which included a field expedition to the RMS Titanic. He hopes to set aside the boring impression people have of archaeology, saying, "People have this idea of archaeologists sitting there with a brush and a toothpick, but it can be exciting."

Arbuthnot's trip to the Titanic took him 12,600 feet below the ocean's surface. James Cameron, the producer, writer, and director of the movie "Titanic" recruited Arbuthnot in 2005 to work on the first systematic archeological survey of Titanic's internal bow structure. Findings from this survey were shown in the Discovery Channel special "Last Mysteries of the Titanic" and will exhibited as part of the Titanic Legacy Database Project presently in development with the non-profit digital historic preservation organization, CyArk.

== Team Atlantis ==
Arbuthnot founded Team Atlantis Productions in 1996. The name, of course, is a play on the mythical underwater city of Atlantis. Arbuthnot defines Team Atlantis, saying, "TA is a multi-disciplinary outfit whose mission is to explore archeological mysteries with an emphasis on those enigmas associated with underwater contexts." Because underwater archeological sites usually have some connection with sites on land, Team Atlantis is not restricted to only underwater locations.

Team Atlantis has explored and surveyed many sites around the world, including:

- Egypt (1996): Here, Arbuthnot and his team traveled extensively along the Giza Plateau. Arbuthnot developed his Orion Pyramid Theory while in Egypt.
- Grand Cayman Island, Caribbean (1997): Arbuthnot participated in the mapping of the remains of the Geneva Kathleen, a schooner that sank in 1930.
- Yonaguni, Japan (1998): In Japan, Arbuthnot organized an expedition that examined the Yonaguni Monument and created a film documentary of the experience.
- Cat Island, Bahamas (2000): Team Atlantis journeyed to the Bahamas to explore the possibility of ancient shorelines submerged in the shallow water of the Great Bahama Bank.
- The Gulf of Mexico (2000): Arbuthnot and other members of Florida State University's Program in Underwater Archaeology excavated submerged prehistoric sites and shipwrecks under the direction of Dr. Michael Faught.
- Yucatán, Mexico (2000): Team Atlantis explored Mayan ruins at Tulum and Chichen Itza and digitally documented their trip.
- La Jolla in San Diego, California (2005): Underwater artifacts were first discovered here in the early 1900s. Team Atlantis decided to make a trip to California to investigate. The team discovered a total of six artifacts, including a stone bowl, dated 4000 to 7000 years ago. This contributes to the already over 2000 artifacts recovered in this area of at least 34 submerged sites.

== More about La Jolla ==
Team Atlantis Productions sought to open the eyes of the public to archaeological mysteries off the coast of San Diego through their show, "La Jolla's Sunken City." Michael Arbuthnot, the Writer/Producer of the show, paired with Director/Editor David Faires, to take underwater cinematography to new depths. Arbuthnot has been described as "one of the most recognisable archaeologists in the United States" for his contributions to film and archaeology. In particular, he is known for his survey of the R.M.S Titanic with Director James Cameron for the Discovery Channel in 2005.

As stated previously, artifacts were first found in the early 1900s. Children would return to the shore from playing in the shallow water with small stone bowls. Scuba diving became increasingly popular in the 1950s, leading to more exploring around La Jolla. Due to this exploration, more than 2000 artifacts have been recovered. Some date to more than 5000 years ago. At least 34 submerged sites have been discovered in places as deep as 30 meters. Some scientists believe that La Jolla is an entire sunken village. In "La Jolla's Sunken City," Arbuthnot and Faires explore several hypotheses concerning how these objects were originally deposited, and they reveal never before seen artifacts.

Arbuthnot had trouble at the beginning of the expedition, but was eventually successful in finding artifacts at La Jolla. According to the CineForm article on La Jolla: Their success was aided by the help of a small octopus. A diver was tracking it, when the octopus stopped behind a round stone. This 'stone' turned out to be a beautiful stone bowl, which eventually led the team to discovering a total of six artifacts in 20 feet of water. Arbuthnot speculates that these ancient finds date to between 4,000 and 7,000 years ago!

== Currently ==
Arbuthnot has worked on underwater archaeology projects in Florida, North Carolina, Georgia, and the Caribbean since 1997. He has surveyed, mapped, excavated, interpreted and analyzed artifacts, and published reports on a variety of diverse archaeological sites. He continues his work, based mainly in Florida. He also functions as Newsletter Editor for the Florida Archaeological Council.

Arbuthnot presently serves as a Senior Project Manager for SEARCH, a leading cultural resource company based in Florida.

Arbuthnot is working with the Discovery Channel to create the television show "America's Lost Vikings", about the location of the mythical Viking Vinland, and where they may have settled along Canada and the United States.

== Secret Worlds with Michael Arbuthnot ==
Arbuthnot's documentary Secret Worlds with Mike Arbuthnot began airing on the travel channel in 2010.

== Family ==
Born in Oakland, California, son of Robert Murray Arbuthnot, Michael is married to Serena Lynn Conrad who had two sons by her first marriage. They live in St Augustine, Florida.
