= PS Hero =

Australian paddle steamer

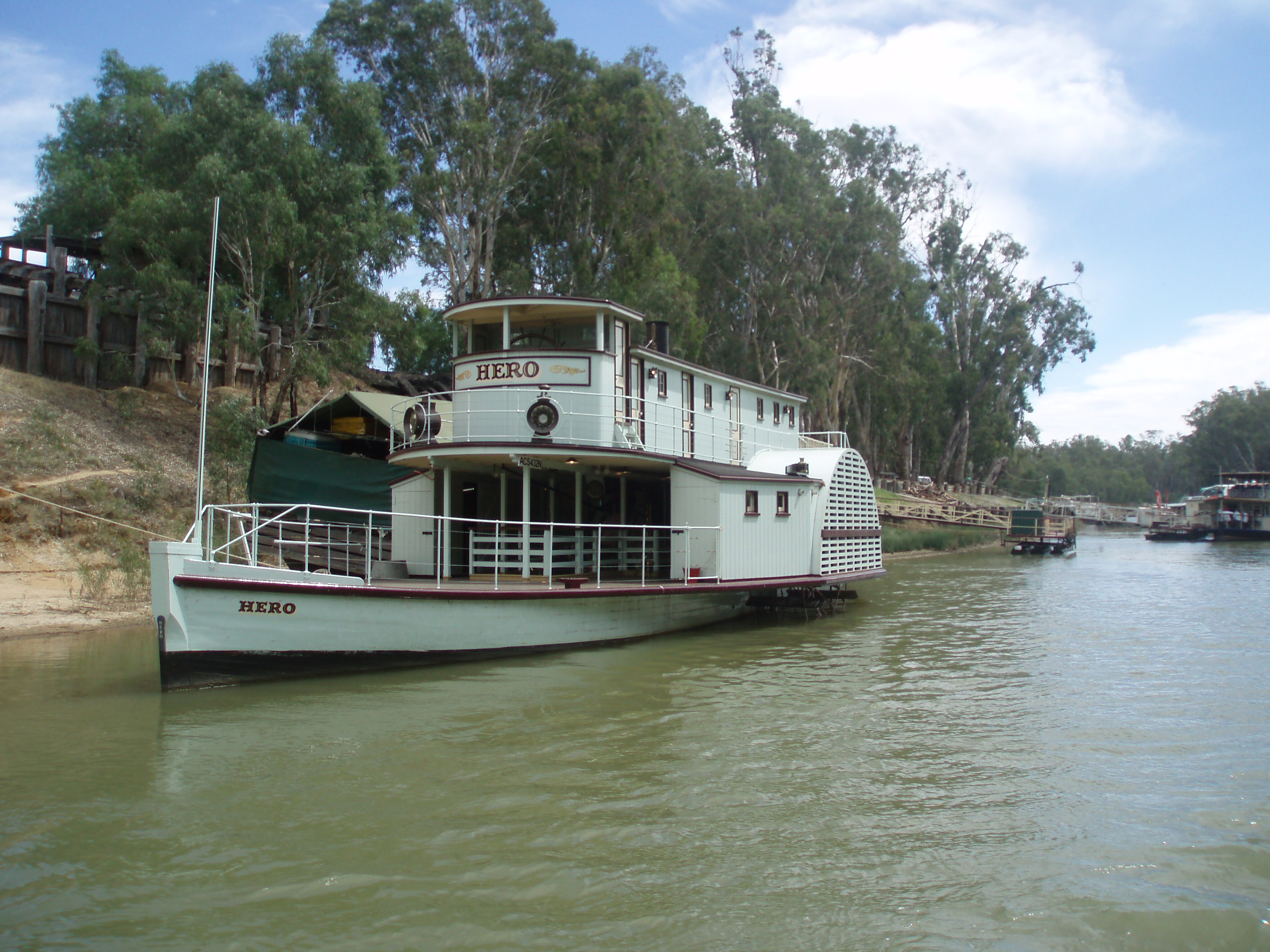
- Paddle Steamer Hero - Echuca

History

Australia
- Name: Hero
- Route: River Murray, Australia
- Launched: 1874
- In service: 1874
- Out of service: 1957
- Reinstated: 2000
- Home port: Echuca, Victoria (Australia)
- Status: Tourist vessel

General characteristics
- Class & type: Side paddle steamer
- Length: 28.1 m
- Beam: 5.2 m
- Propulsion: Steam
- Notes: Data compiled from several sources

The Hero is a paddle steamer that was built at Echuca in 1874 by George Linklater. The working life of Hero first ended in 1957, but it was later restored c2000 as a first class luxury paddle steamer finely fitted-out for private charters.

== History ==
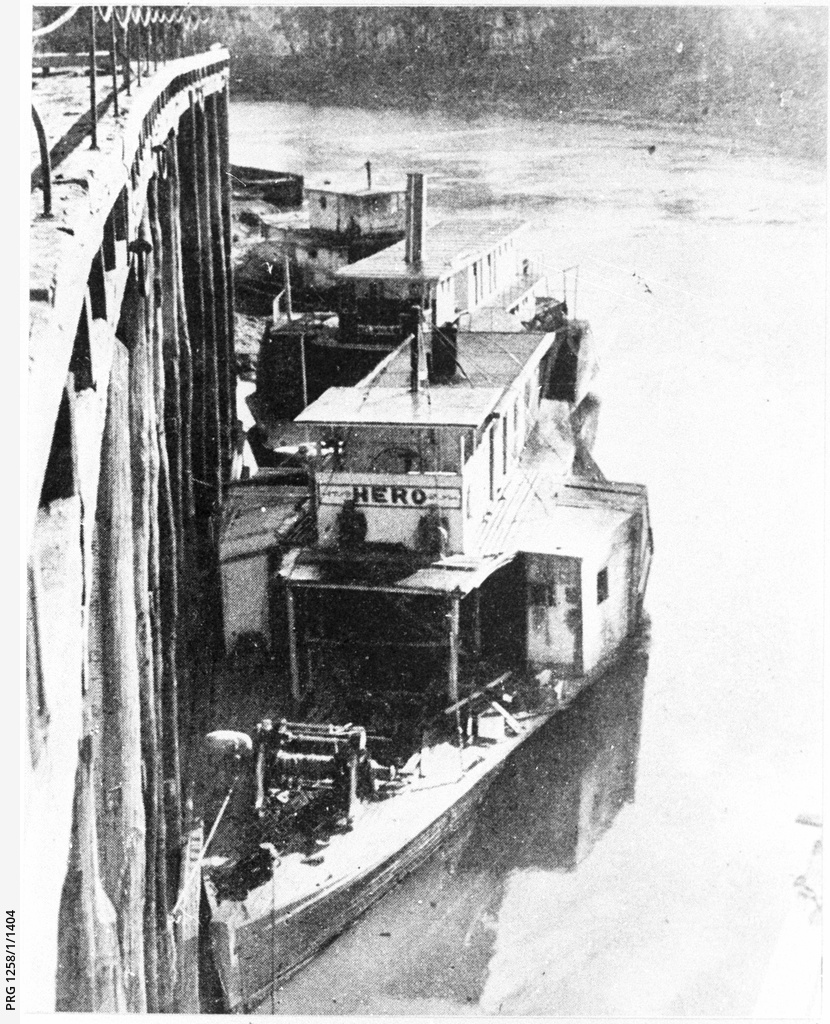
PS Hero - Echuca Wharf circa 1940. Source State Library SA

The Hero traded on the Murrumbidgee River as a hawking vessel until the 1930s when sold to Arbuthnot Sawmills at Koondrook as a logging boat. The company also owned the PS Alexander Arbuthnot.

In 1942, the Hero and two barges (John Campbell and Cannally) were purchased by the Forests Commission Victoria from Arbuthnot Sawmills and moved to Echuca. One of the pressing requirements during the War was to organise emergency supplies of firewood for a range of uses including military and civilian heating and cooking, and as a substitute for coal for locomotives because of a miners strike at Wonthaggi. PS Hero, under well known Captain Spencer (Spinny) Clark, was used to transport the much needed redgum logs from near Yielima in the Barmah State forest about 80 upstream to Echuca wharf. The two loaded barges were floated downstream from the forest to Echuca and the logs cut into foot blocks before being taken by rail to Melbourne. At one stage, annual production was upward of half a million tonnes. Most of the labour was provided by Italian internees.

In 1950 the Hero and barges were sold to the Collins Brothers and moved to Mildura. Later, in 1956, the Hero sold to Chislett Brothers at Boundary Bend, Victoria, and again worked as a logging boat.

During the 1952 and 1956 floods in Australia, Hero was used for various flood mitigation purposes.

In January 1957 Hero caught fire at Boundary Bend, near Robinvale, and sank. Over the years it was stripped and slowly deteriorated. Its paddle wheels were removed and installed on the PV Pride of the Murray.

In 1989, Gary and Irene Byford purchased Hero. They raised it in February 1998 and removed the boiler and engine. The hull was moved to Echuca where it was restored and re-launched on 16 September 2000, the 126th anniversary of its original launch.

== Particulars ==
Hero is 28 metres long and can carry up to 75 passengers.

Its original steam engines have been refitted.
