= Hugh Arbuthnot =

Hugh Arbuthnot or Arbuthnott may refer to:

- Hugh Arbuthnot (British Army officer) (1780–1868), British General and Member of Parliament
- Sir Hugh Arbuthnot, 7th Baronet (1922–1983), Scottish soldier
- Hugh James Arbuthnott (born 1936), British diplomat
