= Eric Arbuthnot =

South African cricketer (1888–1966)

Personal information
- Full name: Eric Arbuthnot
- Born: 13 September 1888; Equeefa, Umzinto, Colony of Natal
- Died: 16 November 1966 (aged 78); Durban, South Africa

Career statistics
| Competition | FC |
|---|---|
| Matches | 3 |
| Runs scored | 122 |
| Batting average | 30.5 |
| 100s/50s | -/- |
| Top score | 5 |
| Balls bowled | 0 |
| Wickets | 0 |
| Bowling average | – |
| 5 wickets in innings | – |
| 10 wickets in match | – |
| Best bowling | – |
| Catches/stumpings | 2/– |
- Source: CricketArchive, 18 February 2010

Eric Arbuthnot was a South African first-class cricketer.
