= Arbuthnot Lake =

Lake in Washington State, U.S.

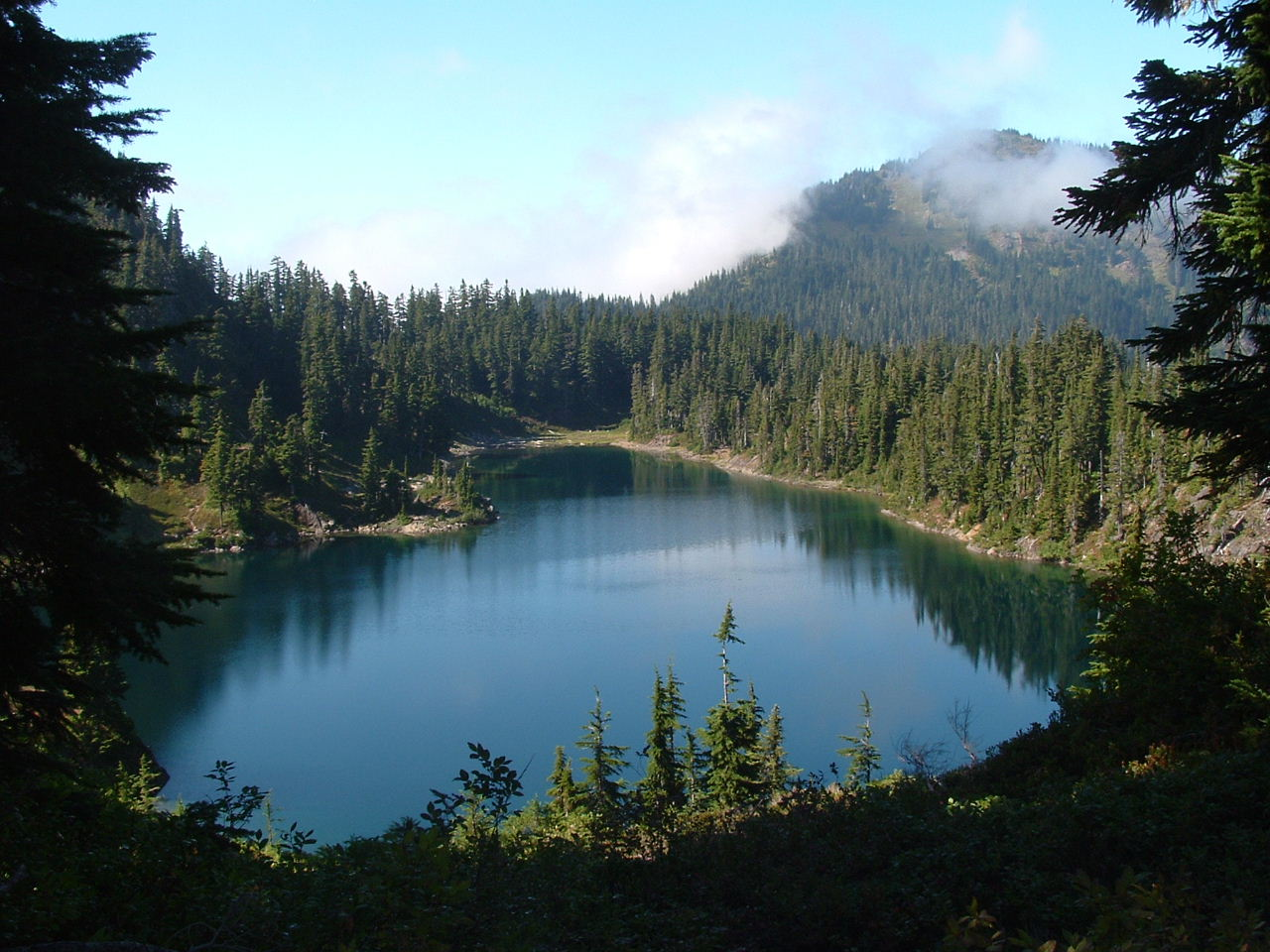

- Location within Washington (state) Location within the United States
- Location: Mount Baker Wilderness, Whatcom County, Washington
- Group: Galena Chain Lakes
- Coordinates: 48.8591810°N 121.7230220°W
- Basin countries: United States
- Surface area: 5.0 acres (2.0 ha)
- Surface elevation: 4,800 ft (1,500 m)

Arbuthnot Lake, Arbuthnet Lake, or Lower Chain Lake is a lake in the Mount Baker Wilderness Area, in Whatcom County, Washington, United States. It is one of the Galena Chain lakes. At one end of the lake is "Arbuthnot Falls". The lake was named in 1906.
