= PS Pevensey =

Australian paddle steamer

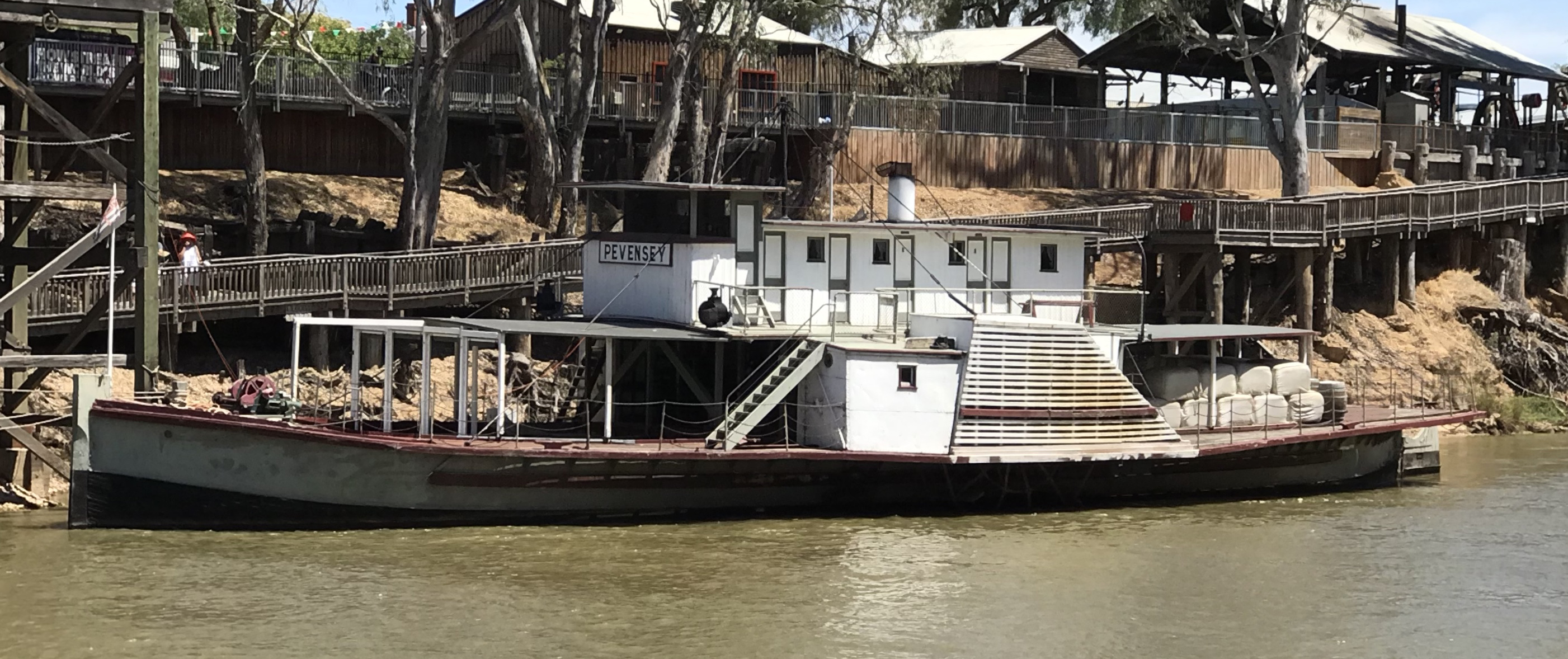
- PS Pevensey (2021)

History

Australia
- Name: Pevensey
- Port of registry: Melbourne, Victoria
- Route: River Murray, Australia
- Builder: Permewan Wright & Co. Ltd.
- Laid down: 1911
- Home port: Echuca, Victoria
- Identification: 120770
- Status: Tourist vessel

General characteristics
- Class & type: Paddle steamer
- Tonnage: 130 grt
- Length: 111.6 ft (34 m)
- Beam: 23.0 ft (7 m)
- Depth: 6.9 ft (2 m)
- Propulsion: Side-wheel paddle steamer
- Notes: Registered Heritage Vessel

PS Pevensey is a historic paddle steamer, with its original steam engine, in the fleet of steamers at Echuca Wharf, Victoria, Australia. Built in 1911, it traded on the Murray River until about 1958. In 1973 it was brought by Echuca for restoration and now operates as a tourist boat.

== Particulars ==
Pevensey was of composite construction, with timber on iron frames, built at the Moama slipway in 1911 by Permewan, Wright & Co. Ltd. The hull is 111.6 ft (34 m) in length, with a 23.0-foot (7 m) beam and 6.9 ft (2 m) in depth, was measured at 130 grt. It still has its original steam engine and boiler, built by Marshall, Sons & Co. of Gainsborough, England. It is a 20 nhp high-pressure, two-cylinder engine, No 55721, which gives Pevensey a speed of 8 knots (9.2 mph; 15 km/h).

== History ==
The PS Pevensey with covered load of timber (c. 1939)

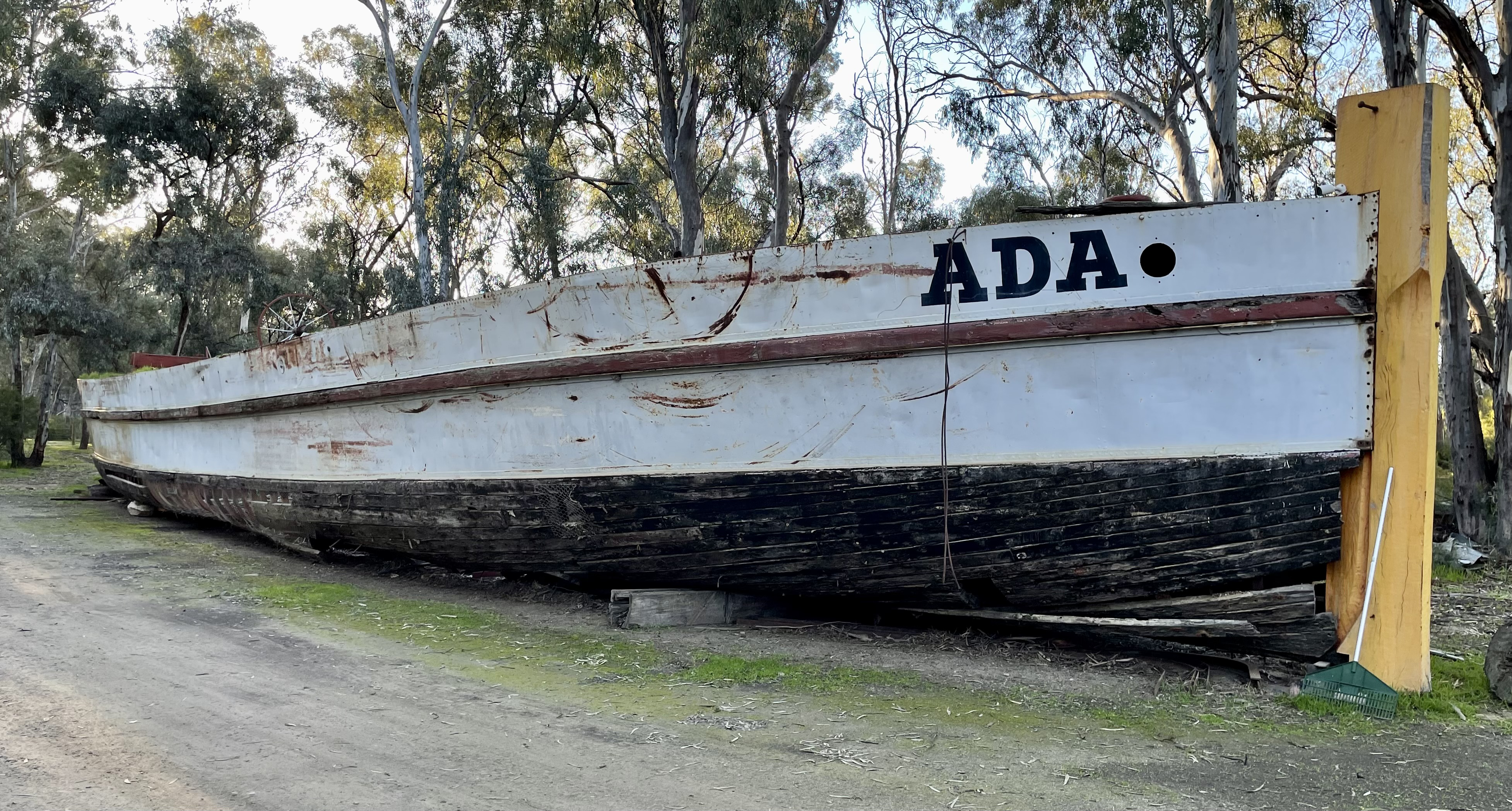
Ada barge (Moama Slipway – 2022)

Pevensey began life in 1910 as a barge named Mascotte, but was rebuilt as a paddle steamer within twelve months. The completed steamer was named after a sheep property on the Murrumbidgee River called Pevensey Station. It was first operated by its builder and collected bales of wool from sheep stations and brought them to the Echuca wharf. From the wharf, it was loaded onto trains and taken to Melbourne for export overseas. Pevensey, with a cargo capacity of 120 tons, could carry 815 bales of wool and a total of 2,000 bales when barges were towed along behind. Pevensey's barge, also composite built, was called Ada, and is also preserved at Echuca.

Pevensey was sold to Murray Shipping Ltd in July 1919. In October 1932 it suffered a major fire at Koraleigh Landing, near Swan Hill, but returned to service in 1935 after rebuild at Morgan, South Australia, running between there and Mildura. After the river trade ended around 1958, Pevensey was tied up at Mildura where it was sunk by vandals in 1967, though later raised. In 1968, Pevensey was purchased by the Collins brothers (of Mildura) with intention of use as a tourist attractions. The vessel was refloated and moored at Gol Gol; however, the intentions were never carried out. The Collins brothers later sold the paddle steamer to the Mildura City Council, with no further restoration being completed. In 1973 the steamer was purchased by Echuca City Council for $20,000 and towed there for restoration (leaving Mildura on 22 July 1973), with assistance of the Victorian Government. PS Pevensey arrived in Echuca on 5 August 1973, and was slipped in December 1974 (however, restoration work was delayed by several major floods until 1976). Pevensey was launched back into the Murray River on 29 October 1976.

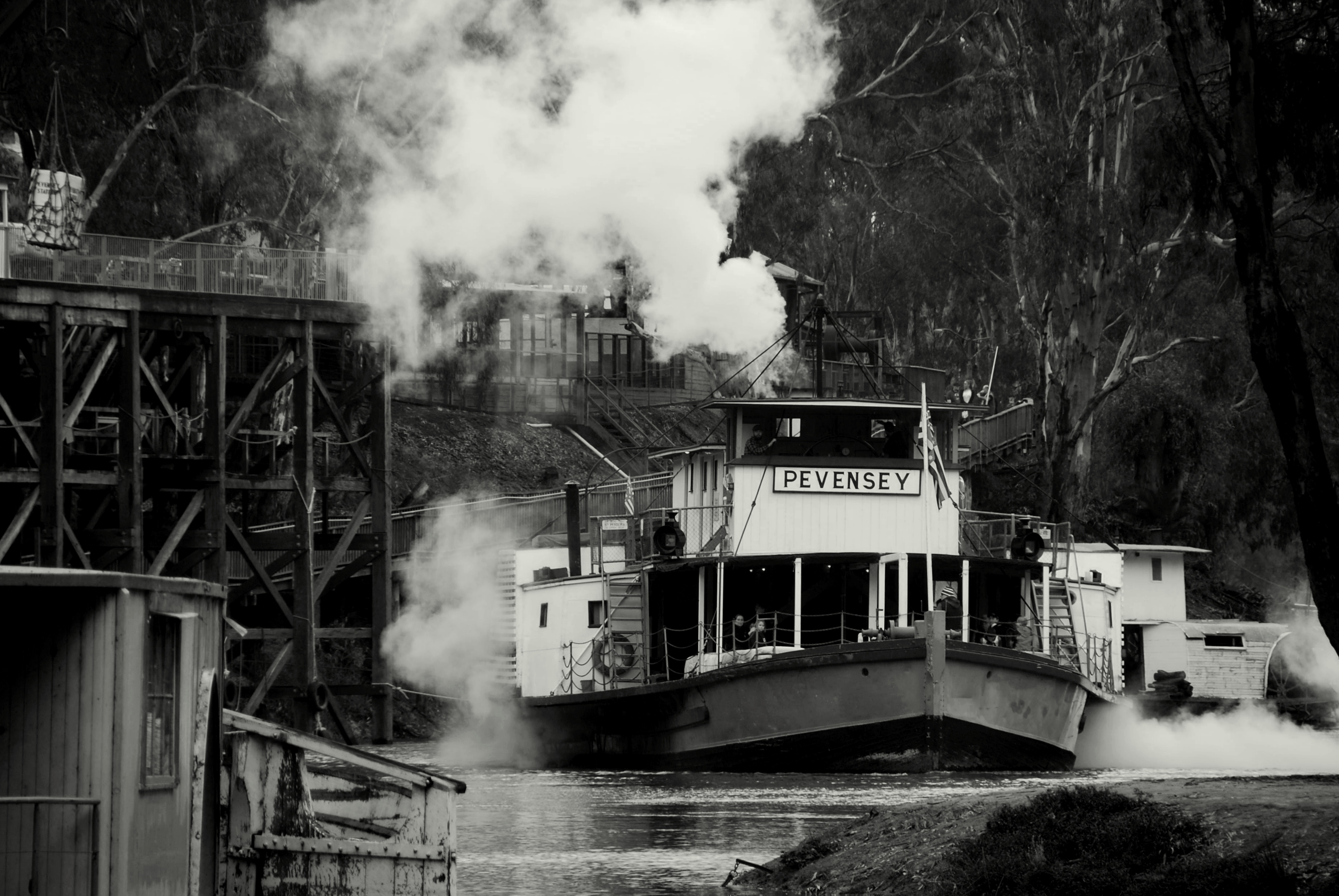
Pevensey with steam up at Echuca

Pevensey starred in the role of the fictional PS Philadelphia in the Australian television mini-series All the Rivers Run, made in Echuca in 1982–1983, alongside fellow Echuca steamer Emmylou.

The Pevensey's composite barge, Ada (built in 1899), was purchased by the Port of Echuca in 1974. In a preservation effort, the 52-tonne barge was removed from the Murray River in August 2012 (at a cost of $33,000), and now resides towards the rear of the Moama slipway. The current condition of the barge is described as "poor", with "no funds available, nor plans in place, to restore the Ada barge".
