= James G. Arbuthnot =

American wrestling coach (1883–1964)

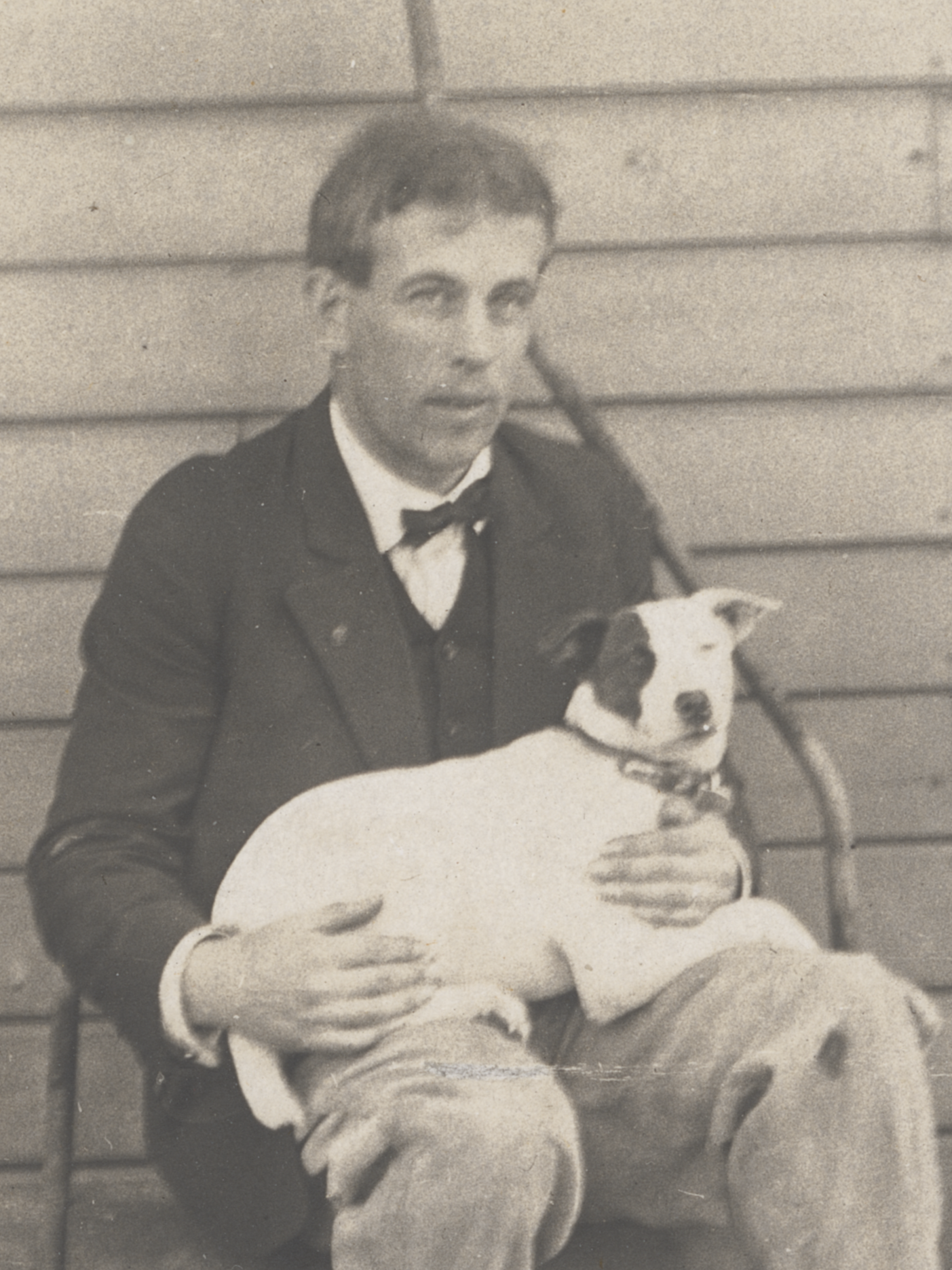
- Arbuthnot sitting on a large roller, holding his dog, c. 1910

Biographical details
- Born: December 31, 1883; Hubbell, Nebraska, U.S.
- Died: December 2, 1964 (aged 80); Roseville, California, U.S.

Coaching career (HC unless noted)
- 1911–1917: Oregon Agricultural
- 1920: Oregon Agricultural

Administrative career (AD unless noted)
- 1906–1918: Oregon Agricultural

Head coaching record
- Overall: 10–3–3 (dual meet)

Accomplishments and honors

Championships
- 4 Northwest Conference (1913, 1915–1917); 1 PCC (1920)

1911 OAC wrestling team, Coach Arbuthnot, and his dog

James G. Arbuthnot (December 31, 1883 – December 2, 1964) was an American collegiate wrestling coach, athletics administrator, and physical edication professor. He was the head wrestling coach at Oregon Agricultural College—now known as Oregon State University–from 1911 to 1917 and in 1920. In eight seasons at Oregon Agricultural, he compiled a 10–3–3 dual meet record and won five conference championships. Arbuthnot was also the athletic director at Oregon Agricultural from 1906 to 1918.

Arbuthnot was born on December 31, 1883, in Hubbell, Nebraska, where he received his early education. He earned a Bachelor of Science degree from the University of Kansas and a Master of Arts degree from the University of Washington. He also did postgraduate work in physical education at Harvard University and Columbia University.

Arbuthnot was a physical director for the YMCA in Aberdeen, Washington and a class leader for the YMCA in Portland, Oregon. In 1909, he was appointed assistant physical director for Portland's YMCA.

Arbuthnot was also a professor of physical edication at Oregon State. He died on December 2, 1964, at the Roseville Hospital in Roseville, California.
