= PV Pride of the Murray =

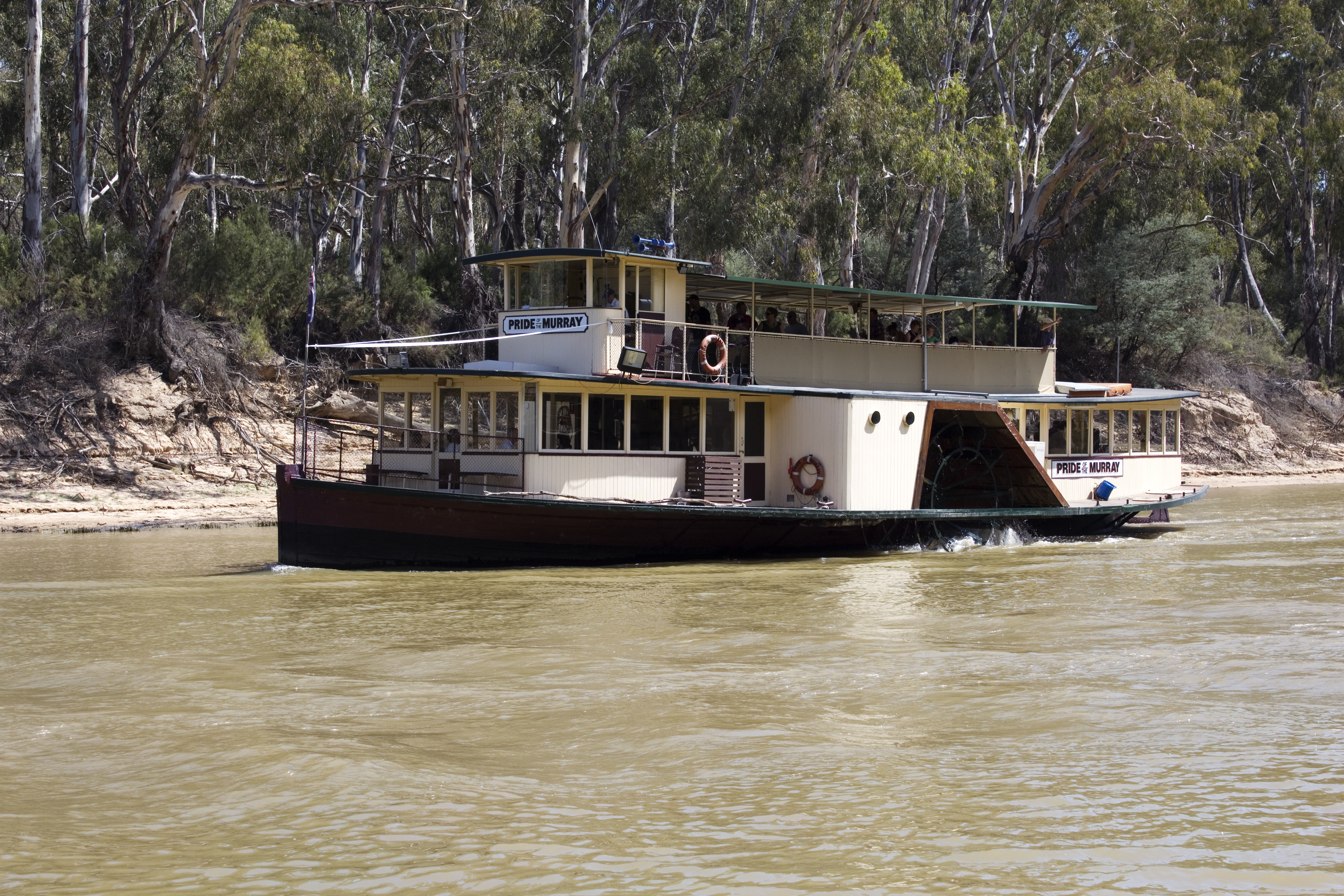
- Pride of the Murray in 2012

History

Australia
- Name: PV Pride of the Murray
- Namesake: PS Pride of the Murray (1865)
- Owner: Outback Pioneers, Longreach
- Route: Murray River; Thomson River
- Builder: Maxwell Carrington
- Launched: 1924
- Reinstated: 1977
- Homeport: Echuca, Victoria; (1924–1956; 1977–2022); Longreach, Queensland; (2022– )
- Identification: C24
- Nickname(s): The Pride, POTM
- Status: Tourist vessel

General characteristics
- Class & type: Side paddle wheeler
- Length: 82 ft 6 in (25.1 m)
- Beam: 16 ft (4.9 m)
- Depth of hold: 5 ft (1.5 m)
- Propulsion: Diesel
- Notes: Data compiled from several sources

PV Pride of the Murray, like many other Australian paddle wheelers, started out life as a timber logging barge. It was built at Echuca on the Murray River in 1924, and relaunched as a tourist vessel in 1977, also at Echuca. In 2022 the vessel was transported overland to Longreach, Queensland, for use as a tourist attraction on the Thompson River.

== History ==
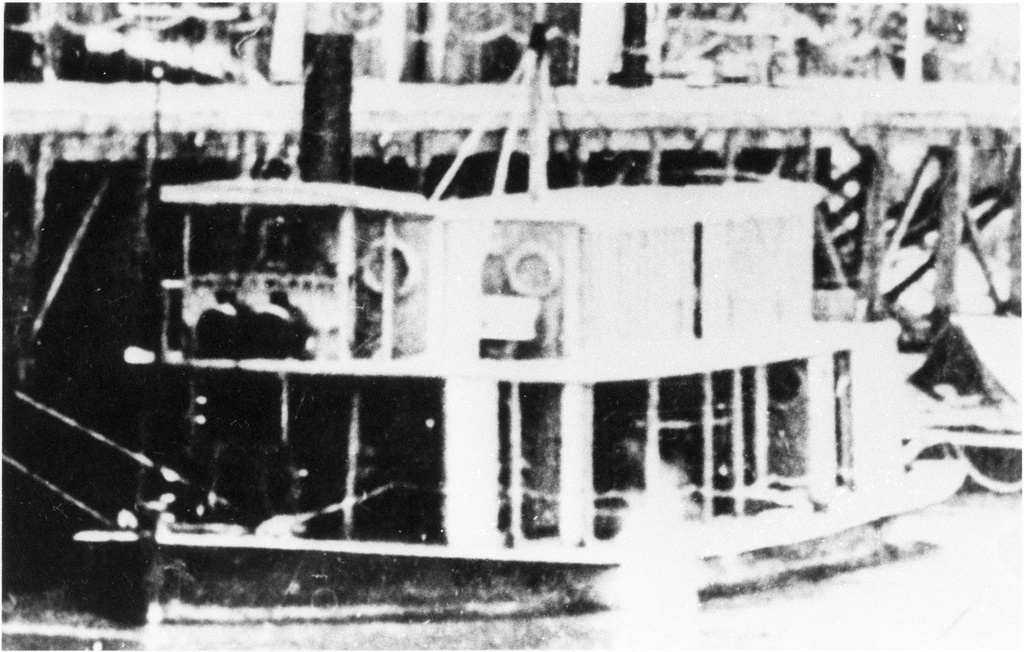
PS Pride of the Murray, built 1865, at the Echuca Wharf (c. 1895)

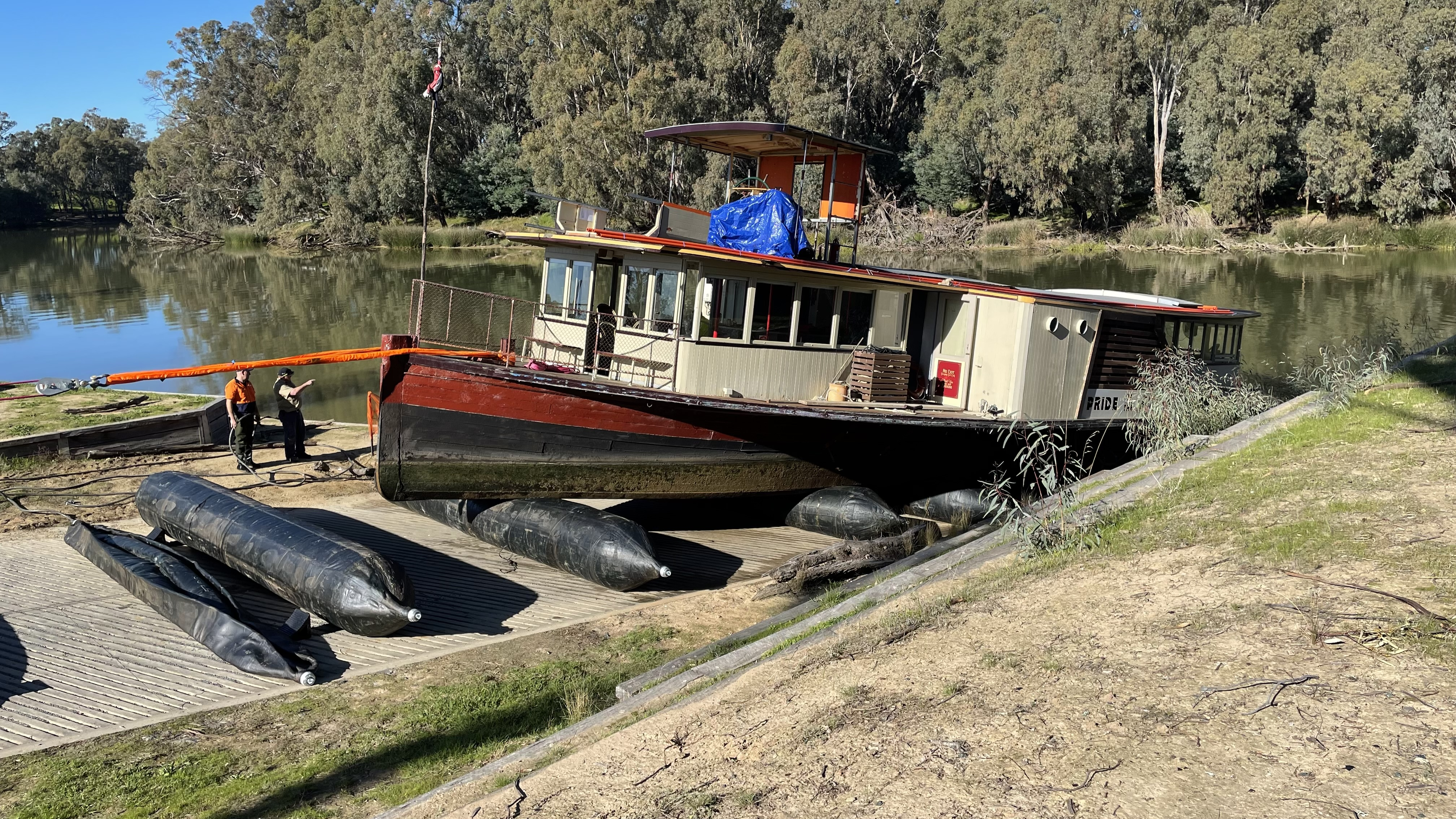
PV Pride of the Murray, with promenade deck collapsed, leaving the Murray River in May 2022

Pride of the Murray was built as the timber logging barge C24, at Echuca in 1924. Constructed by C Felshaw for the Murray River Sawmills, C24 took a team of twelve men between three and four months to complete.

In 1956, C24 was towed upstream by PS Oscar W for use during the construction of the new Barmah bridge. Following completion of the bridge, the barge was let go to drift downstream with the current (though still handled by two men) for five days to return to Echuca.

At the end of its working life it was abandoned and sunk in the Murray River (on the Victorian bank, just upstream of the Echuca-Moama Road Rail Bridge). In May 1973, Captain Maxwell Carrington decided to restore the C24 barge, purchasing the wreck for $100. Following the removal of over 250 tons of silt, the barge was refloated and repaired at the Moama slip. Multiple hull planks were renewed, and two decks of accommodation were subsequently built up. Pride of the Murray was launched as a diesel-electric passenger vessel from the Echuca Wharf slipway in 1977. The vessel's helm was originally located forward on the main deck, however due to the location of passenger seating the wheel was relocated to the upper deck.

Pride of the Murray, in conjunction with PS Canberra and PS Emmylou, was formerly operated by Murray River Paddlesteamers as a tourist attraction in Echuca. It ran hour-long journeys up and down the river daily, a Riverlunch cruise, and was also available to charter privately.

In 2022, Pride of the Murray was purchased by Outback Pioneers, located in Longreach, Queensland. The paddle vessel was relocated 1,750 km (1,090 mi) to the Thompson River by a 26-metre-long 700HP prime mover featuring 106 tyres, joining the Thomson Belle as part of the Outback Pioneers fleet. For the purchase and relocation of the Pride of the Murray, Outback Pioneers was awarded the Social Media Legends award by the Outback Queensland Tourism Association for their "four-week social media campaign showcasing the incredible journey" of the historic vessel.

On 6 March 2023, Pride of the Murray sank at its mooring; progressively listing, then capsizing onto its port side and becoming completely submerged. Salvage of the vessel was expected to take a week, while the sinking was confirmed as 'non suspicious' by local police. A small amount of diesel fuel was discharged into the Thompson River by the sinking vessel, however it was deemed to not have any effect on Longreach's drinking water supply. By early June the vessel was submerged in 9 metres of water; detailed hydrographic surveys had been completed along with expert analysis and digital mapping in an effort to assess the efforts needed to salvage the vessel.

The Pride of the Murray was expected to be refloated upon completion of reports by the Australian Maritime Safety Authority, Maritime Safety Queensland and insurers, with restoration efforts expected to begin in mid-September. On 7 September 2023, Pride of the Murray was refloated. The operation began with divers securing harnesses, prior to the attachment of airbags, before the vessel was raised and secured on a hardstand.

Following the challenging salvage operation, owner Richard Kinnon (tourism company Outback Pioneers) revealed that the boat would not be able to cruise again. He said that the vessel would need to be "virtually rebuilt from scratch" to pass certification requirements and that he now plans to restore and repurpose the Pride of the Murray and build a replica vessel. The original vessel is now planned to be restored on the banks of the Thompson (at a cost of $1.5 million), for future use as a "storytelling centre and a hospitality space".

== Particulars ==
Pride of the Murray has dimensions 25.1m x 4.9m x 1.5m. Her paddle-wheels were acquired from the wreck of the PS Hero, which was burned and sank in 1957.

The vessel was named after the earlier PS Pride of the Murray, a stern-wheeler paddle steamer built by Johnston and Davies at Echuca in 1865.
