= Alexander Arbuthnot (paddle steamer) =

Last paddle steamer built as a working boat on the Murray River, Australia

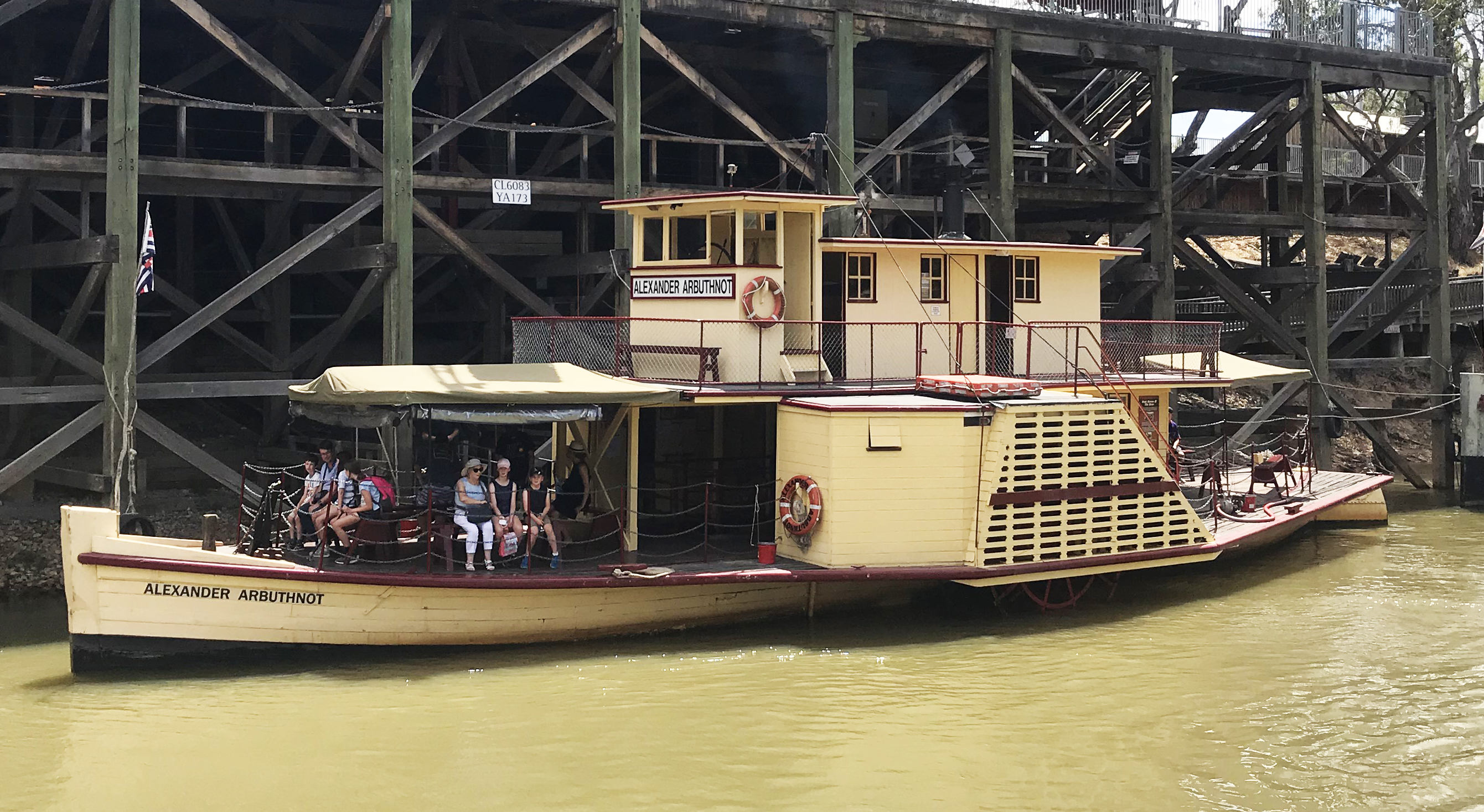
- PS Alexander Arbuthnot

History

Australia
- Name: Alexander Arbuthnot
- Namesake: Alexander Arbuthnot
- Operator: Echuca Paddlesteamers
- Port of registry: Melbourne, Victoria
- Builder: C Felshaw
- Launched: May 31, 1923
- In service: 1923
- Out of service: 1947
- Reinstated: 1994
- Home port: Echuca, Victoria
- Identification: 151809
- Nickname(s): The A.A., The Arbuthnot
- Status: Tourist vessel

General characteristics
- Type: Ferry boat
- Displacement: 46 long tons (47 t)
- Length: 76 ft (23 m)
- Beam: 15 ft 3 in (4.65 m)
- Draught: 2 ft 3 in (0.69 m)
- Propulsion: Wood-fuelled steam engine Richard Hornsby & sons, 10 hp (7 kW)
- Speed: 6 mph (9.7 km/h)
- Capacity: 47 passengers

Alexander Arbuthnot is the last paddle steamer built as a working boat during the riverboat trade era on the Murray River, Australia.

== Vessel history ==
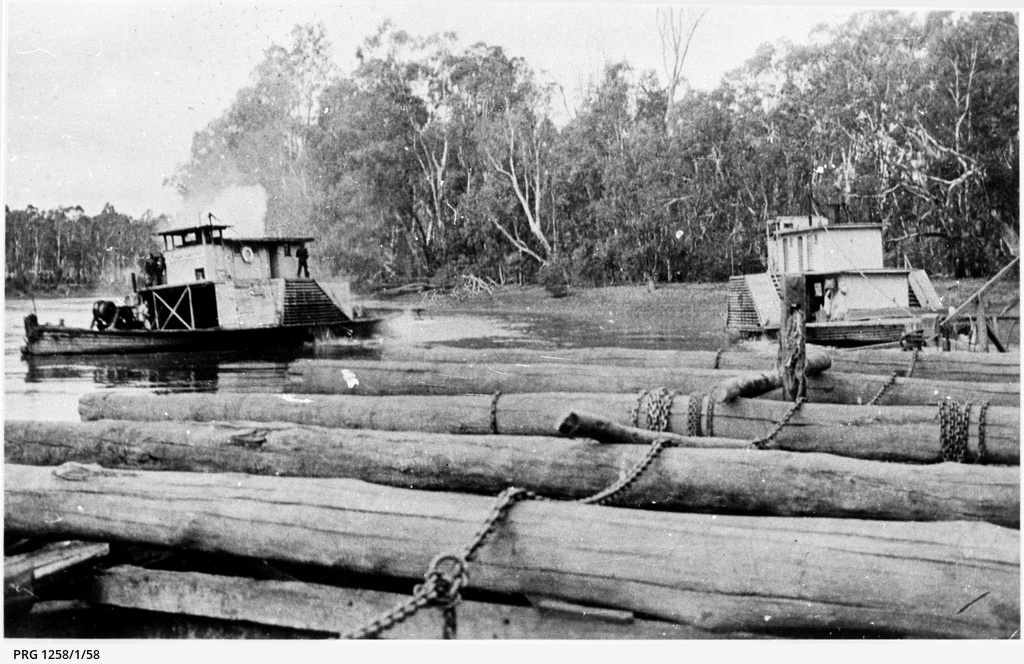
PS Alexander Arbuthnot was used to supply logs the company sawmill at Koondrook, circa 1930

The ship was built by the Arbuthnot Sawmill at Koondrook in 1916, as a barge, and named after the sawmill's founder. She was fitted with an engine and superstructure in 1923. The engine was built by Richard Hornsby & sons, Grantham Lincolnshire, England and imported for Melbourne's Centennial international exhibition of 1888–89, and later installed in the paddle steamer Glimpse in 1889, then re-used in Alexander Arbuthnot in 1923. The ship towed empty barges to the nearby forest to collect logs; then back to the mill where the logs were cut up into lengths of timber. Barges towed upstream could be left for loading then floated back downstream on the current while the steamer returned to the mill and took another barge upstream. The boat worked at the mill until the 1940s.

In 1942, the Alexander Arbuthnot was replaced by the PS Hero and sold to Barmah Charcoals of Barmah. There it transported charcoal from the forests at Yielima and Barmah to Echuca. In July 1942, it was reported that the Arbuthnot returned from Picola to unload 700 bags (over 15 tons) of coal to a railway truck at the Echuca wharf - an activity that hadn't been seen in several years. In early September 1942, it was recorded as delivering 946 bags of charcoal from Yielima. The vessel was then bought by George Newman, a partner of the company, in 1943. The Alexander Arbuthnot sunk at its mooring in 1947, when the river began to rise rapidly.

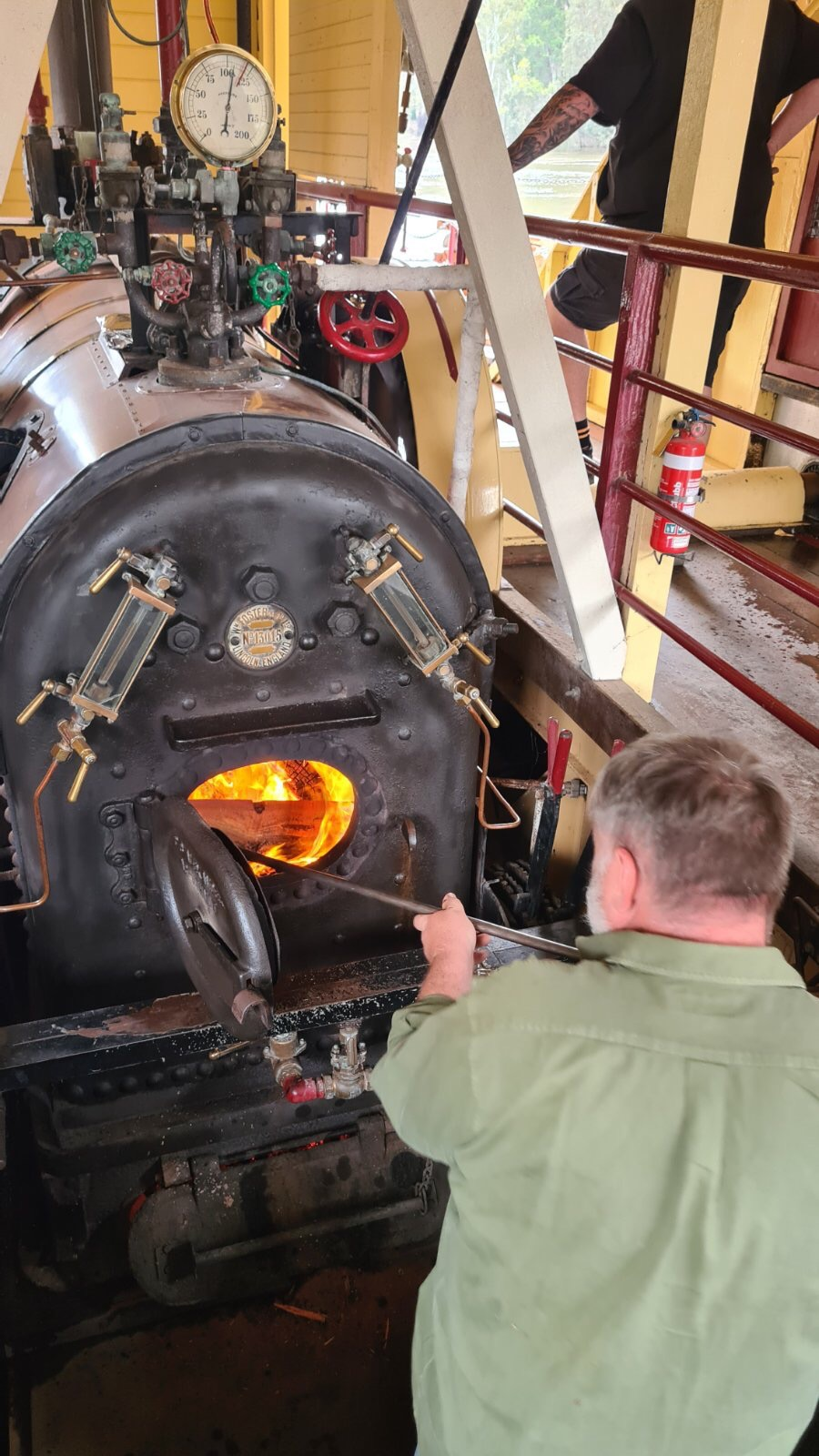
Firing the wood burning boiler

The paddle steamer remained partially submerged for an extended period of time, and as a result the deckhouse was destroyed. A salvage operation began in 1972, and the vessel was refloated on December 31, 1972. The hull was stripped and transported to Barmah, following which it was taken to Shepparton and restored to its original design. It was used at the International Village theme park in Shepparton, running excursions around a 100-foot (30 m) wide man-made moat. In 1989 the Alexander Arbuthnot was bought by the Echuca City Council for further restoration by the Port of Echuca. It was restored at Echuca in 1991 by local shipwright Kevin Hutchison, including new hull decking and planking, a new deckhouse, and a new boiler. Currently the Alexander Arbuthnot carries 47 passengers per trip, and is the youngest boat of the Port of Echuca's fleet. On average, she carries over 25,000 visitors a year.

By 2010, the original Richard Hornsby engine had been reconditioned, and continues to power the boat. In 2015, the Shire of Campaspe approved an additional $65,000 for deck repairs of the Alexander Arbuthnot. Including these funds, the total council contribution to the restoration of the vessel in this period totalled at $492,621.

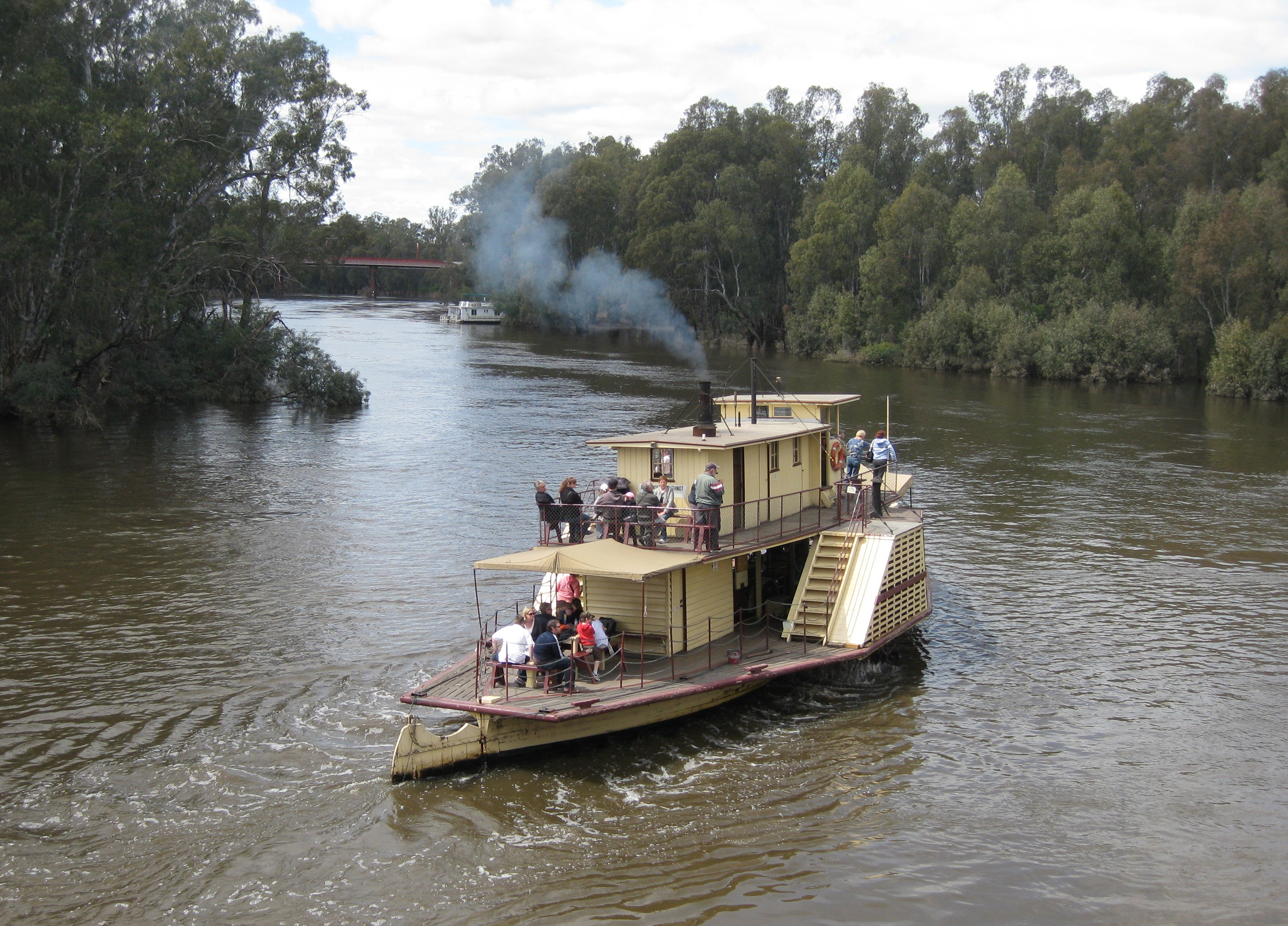
PS Alexander Arbuthnot on the Murray River near Echuca

== See also ==
- List of Murray–Darling steamboats
