= Arbuthnot (schooner) =

At least three British ship's tender or privateer schooners bore the name Arbuthnot during the American Revolutionary War. They were probably named for Admiral Mariot Arbuthnot, who commanded the British Royal Navy's North American station at that time.

- One Arbuthnot was in company in 1778 with His Majesty's armed brig Cabot, Edmund Dod, commander, when they captured the brigantine Deux Amis, and recaptured the ship York. At that time Arbuthnot was the property of the officers of HMS Rainbow. Arbuthnot became the prize of the American ships Argo and Fair American in April 1780. Argo was a Pennsylvanian privateer brig, commissioned on 18 March 1780 under Commander John Ridge of Philadelphia. She was listed as being armed with fourteen guns and having a crew of sixty men. Fair American, under the command of Stephen Decatur, Sr., too was a Philadelphian privateer. She was listed as having a battery of sixteen guns and a crew of 130. Arbuthnot was armed with 14 guns.
- A second Arbuthnot sailed from New York on 16 October 1780 as part of a squadron attacking the James River. She was armed with 16 guns and was under the command of James Goodrich. On 1 October 1782, Lloyd's List reported that the privateer Arbuthnot, of New York, had sent into Bermuda several prizes worth £10,000. Then on 24 January 1783, Lloyd's List reported that the "Arbuthnot Privateer, Messrs. Goodrich", had captured and brought in to Bermuda Nuestra Senora de los Dolores, which had a crew of 104 men and which had carried 22 "double fortified 9 Pounders". (Note: A common usage at the time referred to three classifications: the gun proper, which had a barrel weight of 150 lbs per pound of shot, the double-fortified gun, which had a barrel weight of 200 lbs per pound of shot, and the medium gun, which had a barrel weight of 100 lbs per pound of shot. By comparison, a carronade would have a barrel weight of 65 lbs per pound of shot.) She had been sailing from Havana to Cadiz with a cargo of sugar, indigo, and other goods, as well as 40,000 dollars. Capturing N.S. de los Dolores cost Arbuthnot nine men killed and 31 wounded.
- A third Arbuthnot, of 10 guns, was under the command of Captain John Riddle and sailing from New York to Newfoundland when the Connecticut brigantine Minerva captured her on 24 June 1781.

One schooner that bore the name Arbuthnot was a warship. In 1781, the armed schooner Arbuthnot, tender to HMS Allegiance, captured two American vessels that it sent into Halifax for adjudication by the Vice admiralty court there: Two Brothers (8 February), and Swallow (20 February).
