= Thomas Arbuthnot (ship) =

Sailing ship

History
- Launched: 1841

General characteristics
- Tonnage: 523 tons (old Imperial), 621 tons (new Imperial)

The ship Thomas Arbuthnot was a fast sailing ship, weighing 523 tons (old Imperial), 621 tons (new Imperial). Constructed 1841 in Aberdeen. She carried the first Australian gold from Australia to England 1851. The vessel was one of the largest of the immigrant ships regularly arriving at Australian ports during the 1840s and 50s. It was noted for transporting many orphans during the Great Famine of Ireland.
