= Alexander Arbuthnot (printer) =

Scottish printer (died 1585)

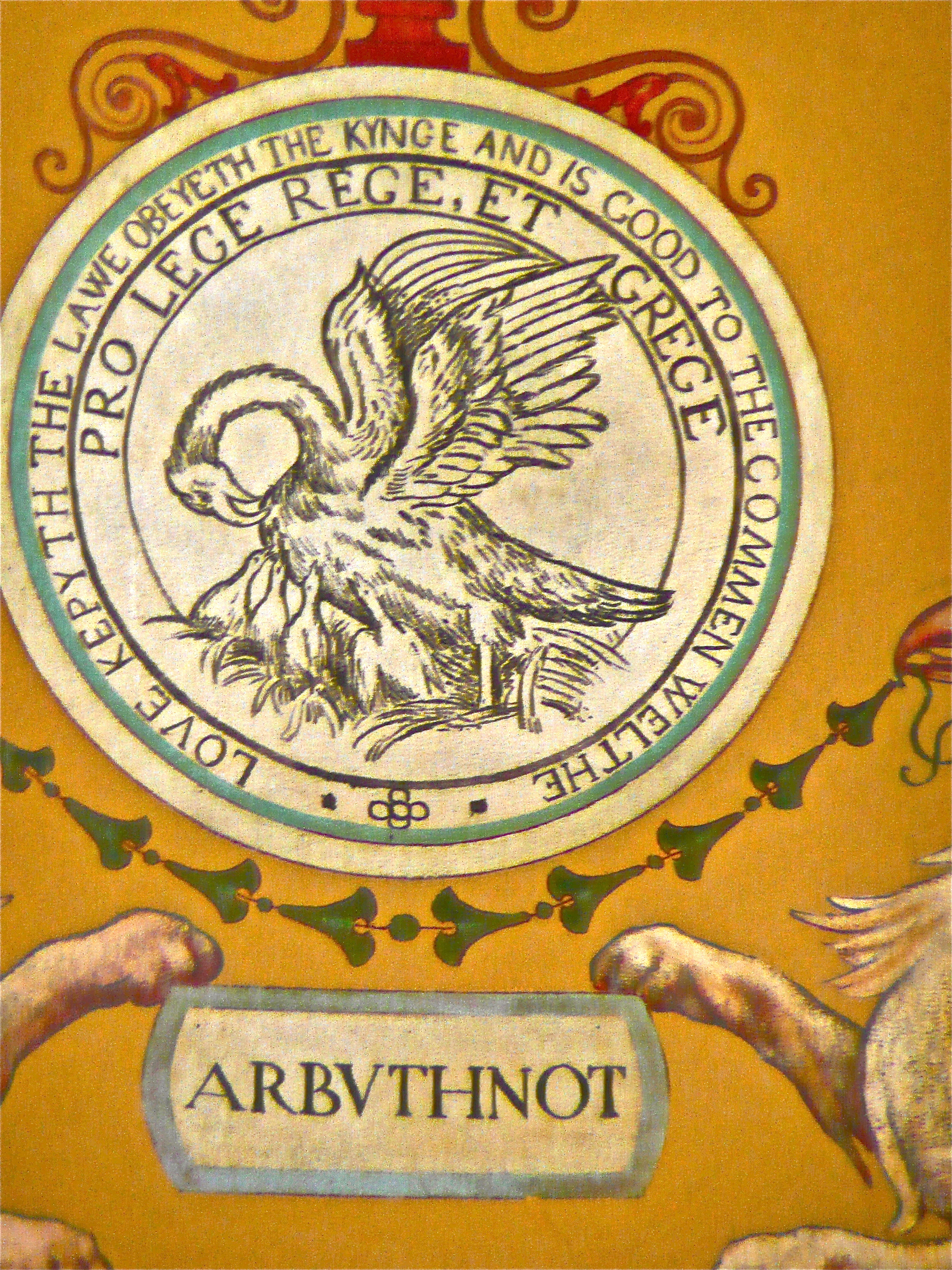
- Alexander Arbuthnot printer's device, Thomas Jefferson Building, Library of Congress
- Died: 1 September 1585
- Occupation: Printer
- Spouse: Agnes Pennycuik
- Parent(s): John Arbuthnot, Sr

Alexander Arbuthnot (died 1 September 1585) was an early printer in Edinburgh, Scotland, the fourth son of John Arbuthnot Sr in Portertown and of Legasland.

== Life ==
He printed the first edition of George Buchanan's first History of Scotland in 1582. He married one Agnes Pennycuick and died intestate.
