= Clan Arbuthnott =

Lowland Scottish clan

- Crest: A peacock's head couped at the neck Proper
- Motto: LAUS DEO (Praise [be] to God)

Profile
- Region: Lowland
- District: Aberdeenshire

Chief
- The Rt. Hon Keith Arbuthnott
- The 17th Viscount of Arbuthnott
- Seat: Arbuthnott House
Clan branches
Arbuthnott of Arbuthnott (chiefs)
See also:
Arbuthnot baronets

Clan Arbuthnott Tartan
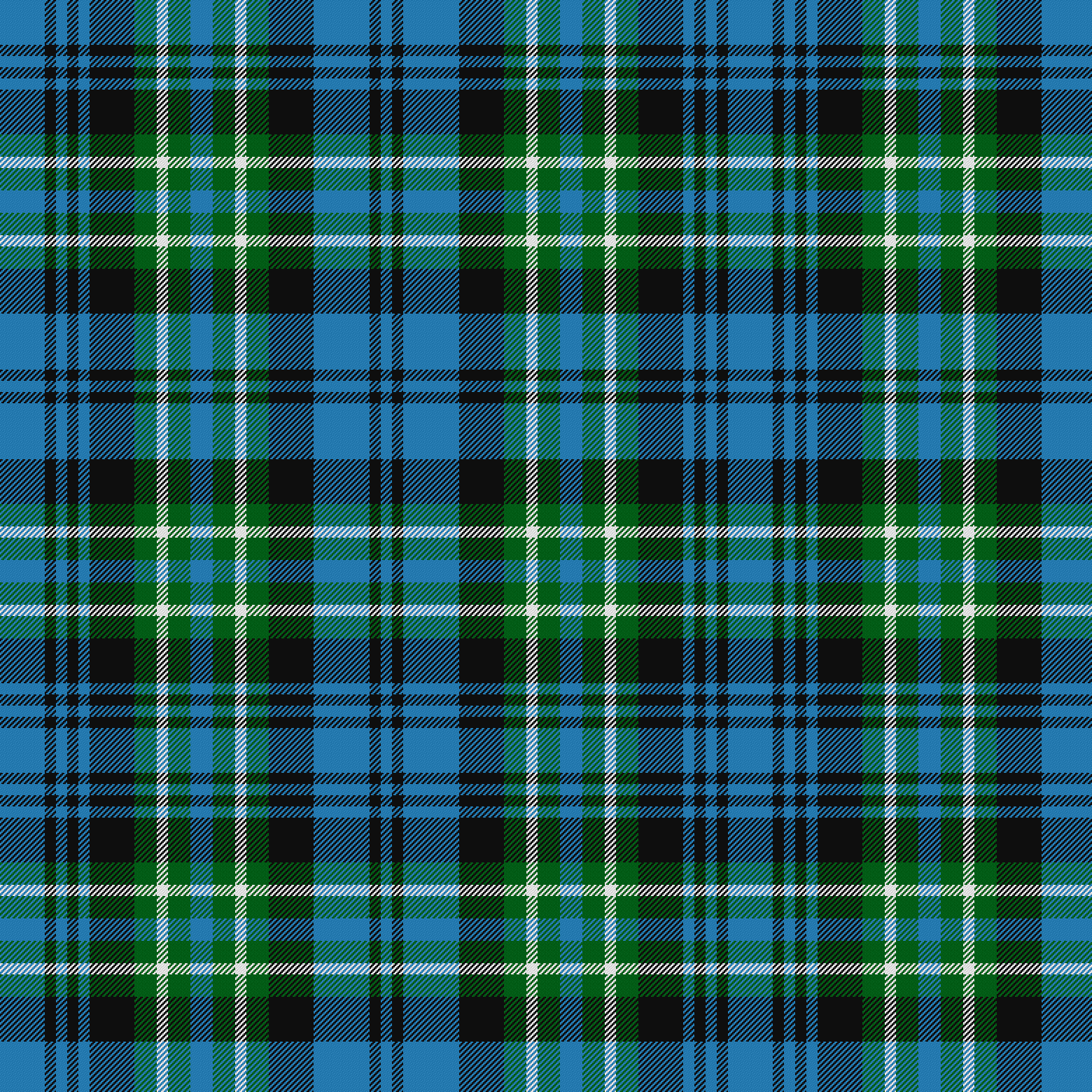
- The Clan Arbuthnott tartan in colors.

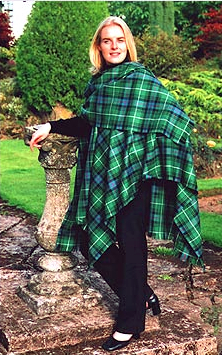
- Arbuthnot Tartan Plaid

Sett

Tartan registries
- STA: #204
- STWR: #204
- SRT entry: Clan Arbuthnott

Clan Arbuthnott is a Lowland Scottish clan.

== History ==
=== Origin of name ===
The name Arbuthnott is of territorial origin from the lands of the same name in the county of Kincardineshire. Early documents refer to these lands as Aberbothenoth which has been translated as the mouth of the stream below the noble house. The Arbuthnott lands have been in the hands of the same noble family for more than twenty-four generations including the present Viscount of Arbuthnott.

=== Origins of the clan ===
Hugh, who may have been from the Clan Swinton family, may have acquired the lands of Arbuthnott through his marriage to Margaret Olifard, heiress of Arbuthnott, sister of Osbert Olifard, who was known as "The Crusader" who was killed in the First Crusade during the reign of William the Lion. Another Hugh, styled "Le Blond", possibly for his fair hair, was Laird of Arbuthnott in about 1282. This Hugh appears in a charter in the same year bestowing lands upon the Monastery of Arbroath for the safety of his soul. The first of the clan to be described in a charter as dominus ejusdem (of that ilk) was Phillip de Arbuthnott.

=== Murder of John Melville of Glenbervie ===
The son of Phillip de Arbuthnott was Hugh Arbuthnott of that ilk who was implicated in the murder of John Melville of Glenbervie who was the sheriff of the Mearns in 1420. The traditional story is that sheriff Melville had made himself very unpopular with the local lairds by too strict an adherence to his jurisdiction. The Duke of Albany at the time was also Regent of Scotland while James I of Scotland was in captivity in England. The Duke is alleged to have become tired of endless complaints about Melville and exclaimed "sorrow gin that sheriff were sodden and supped in broo", which was taken by the disgruntled lairds as a signal to kill the sheriff. The Lairds of Arbuthnott, Mathers, Pitarrow and Halkerton invited Melville to a hunting party in the Garvock Forest. However Melville was lured to a prearranged place where he was killed by being thrown into a cauldron of boiling water and each of the murderers took a spoonful of the murderous brew. The Laird of Arbuthnott was pardoned for his involvement in this affair and died peacefully in 1446.

=== 16th century ===
James Arbuthnott of Arbuthnott had a Crown Charter of the feudal barony of Arbuthnott on 29 January 1507. He had married, by contract dated 31 August 1507, Jean, daughter of Sir John Stewart, 1st Earl of Atholl, a son of Sir James Stewart, 'The Black Knight of Lorn' by his wife Joan Beaufort, Dowager Queen of Scots.

Alexander Arbuthnot, a descendant of a younger son of the main family, was a leading figure in the Church of Scotland and Moderator of the General Assembly of the Church of Scotland in 1577. In 1583 he was asked by the General Assembly to complain to James VI of Scotland about various 'popish practices' still permitted by the King. His complaints were met with not inconsiderable displeasure from the King and he was placed under house arrest in St Andrews. This seems to have had an ill effect on his health, as he died at the age of 44 in 1583.

James VI wrote to some of his lairds on 30 August 1589, asking them to send food, "fat beef, mutton on foot, wild fowls and venison", to be delivered to Walter Naish Master of the Royal Larder in Edinburgh for the Entry and Coronation of Anne of Denmark. As the celebrations were delayed until May 1590, the king sent another letter to Andrew Arbuthnott renewing his request.

=== 17th and 18th centuries ===
Sir Robert Arbuthnott, the direct descendant of the Laird of Arbuthnott who had been involved in the murder of sheriff Melville, was elevated in the peerage as Viscount of Arbuthnott and Baron Inverbervie by Charles I of England.

Dr John Arbuthnot, who claimed kinship with the clan chief's family, was a distinguished physician and political humorist who was educated at the University of Aberdeen. In 1705, he had the fortune of being at Epsom races when Prince George of Denmark, husband of Anne, Queen of Great Britain, was taken ill. Dr Arbuthnot was rushed to his side; the Prince recovered, and Arbuthnot was appointed a royal physician. Over time he became a confidant to the queen and friends to a great many of the leading figures of his time. Dr Samuel Johnson once remarked that he was 'a man of great comprehension, skilful in his profession, versed in the sciences, acquainted with ancient literature and able to animate his mass of knowledge by a bright and active imagination'. Dr John Arbuthnott died in 1779.

=== Modern times from 19th century ===
George Arbuthnot, 1st of Elderslie (son of Robert Arbuthnot, 2nd of Haddo-Rattray and younger brother of Sir William Arbuthnot, 1st Baronet of Edinburgh) emigrated to India and joined Indian firm Lautour & Co, which was the origin of the banking business that came to bear his surname first in India and then later in London: Arbuthnot & Co. After having established a Trusted Name and gathering Deposits from at least 6000 creditors the Firm engaged in speculation through its London correspondent P. Macfadyen & Co operated by Arbuthnot's partner Patrick Macfadyen, whose firm was effectively Arbuthnot's London branch. The Indian bank crashed spectacularly in 1906. It was reported in the Hindu newspaper that "the consequences of this sudden and disastrous failure mean the ruin of many hundreds of families in southern India". At the time Arbuthnot & Co was the most popular bank in Madras. There is a small lane of about 100 meters abutting into the Beach Road of Chennai (then Madras) called Arbuthnot Lane. The successor bank in London continues under the name 'Arbuthnot Latham'.

The previous clan chief was awarded the Distinguished Service Cross (1945) and was appointed Knight of the Thistle and Commander of the Order of the British Empire. In Scotland he headed the Venerable Order of Saint John.

The present Viscount of Arbuthnott and chief of Clan Arbuthnott succeeded to the position on his father's death in 2012.

== Chief ==
The current chief of Clan Arbuthnott is Keith Arbuthnott, 17th Viscount of Arbuthnott, Lord Inverbervie and Chief of the Name and Arms of Arbuthnott.

== Symbolism ==
Members of Clan Arbuthnott can show their allegiance to the clan by wearing a crest badge which contains the chief's heraldic crest and motto. The chief's crest is A peacock's head couped at the neck Proper, his motto is LAUS DEO, from Latin: "Praise God".

Clan members may also wear a clan tartan. The Arbuthnott tartan was registered with the Lord Lyon in 1962 and was inspired by the tartan of the Black Watch.

== Today ==
- Approximate numbers in various countries: UK 350; USA 1,150; Canada 220; Australia and New Zealand 190; South Africa 85; Ireland 120 (depending on whom one includes)
- Ancestral lands: Arbuthnott House and surrounding estate of around 3,000 acres (12 km²) remains the seat of the family today.

== In fiction ==
- An account of the origin of the name and clan is found in Nigel Tranter's novel Tapestry of the Boar.

== Prominent members ==
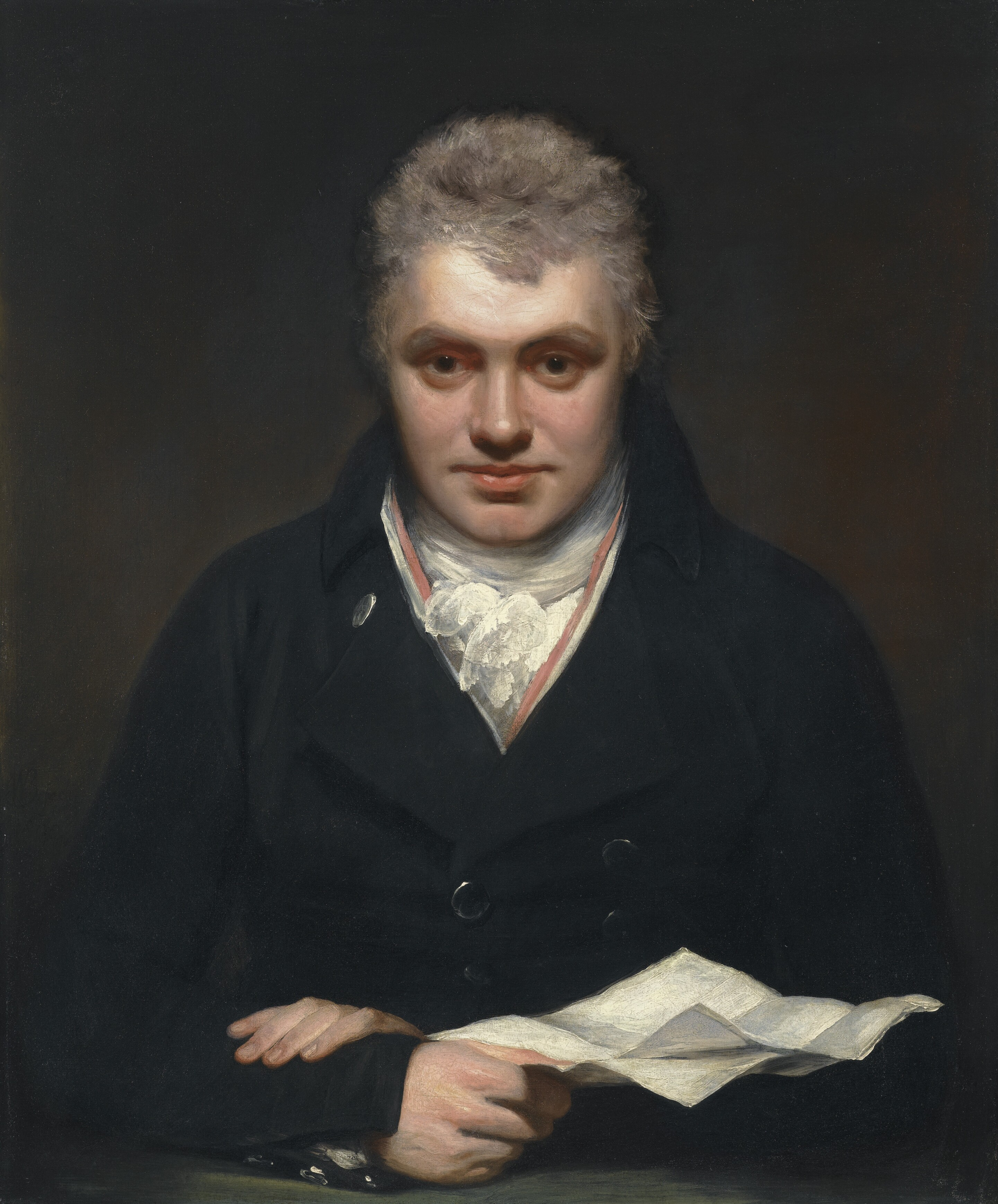
George Arbuthnot of Elderslie (1772–1843), by Sir William Beechey

- Robert Arbuthnot (c. 1761–1809), Scottish soldier and diplomat
- Sir William Arbuthnot, 1st Baronet (1766–1829), Scottish landowner and politician
- Charles George James Arbuthnot (1801–1870), British general
- John Alves Arbuthnot (1802–1875), Scottish born British banker who co-founded Arbuthnot Latham
- George Arbuthnot (civil servant) (1802–1865), British civil servant
- George Bingham Arbuthnot (1803–1867), major-general in the Honourable East India Company
- William Urquhart Arbuthnot (1807–1874), Scottish administrator in India.
- Charles George Arbuthnot (1824–1899), British Army officer
- Forster Fitzgerald Arbuthnot (1833–1901), British Orientalist and translator.
- George Arbuthnot (politician) (1836–1912), British politician who was MP for Hereford
- William Arbuthnot (1838–1893), a Major-General
- George Arbuthnot (priest) (1846–1922), Archdeacon of Coventry
- George Gough Arbuthnot (1848–1929), businessman and civil leader in British India
- Charles Ramsay Arbuthnot (1850–1913), an officer of the British Royal Navy
- John Bernard Arbuthnot (1875–1950), British soldier, banker, and journalist.
- Patricia Evangeline Anne Arbuthnot (1914–1989), Irish writer, traveler, conchologist and artist
