= John A. Arbuthnot =

British banker (1802–1875)

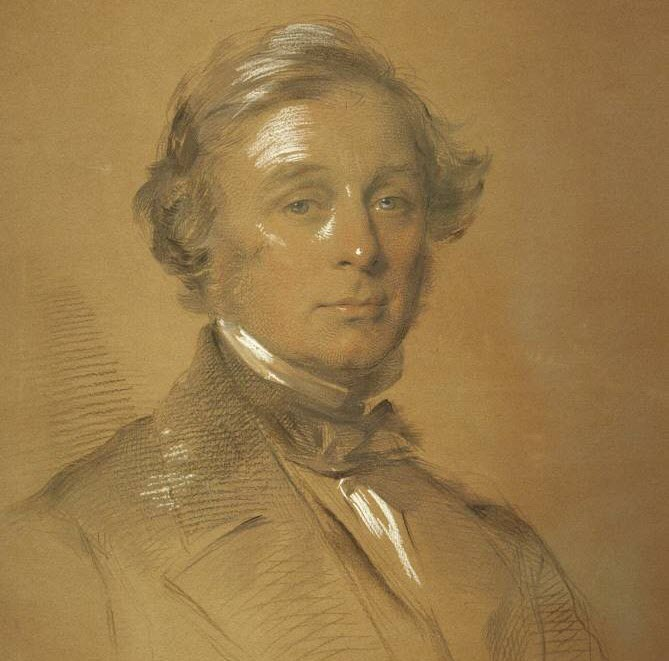

High Sheriff of Berkshire
- In office 5 February 1873 – 1 February 1874
- Preceded by: Sir Nicholas Throckmorton, Bt
- Succeeded by: William Hew Dunn

Personal details
- Born: John Alves Arbuthnot; 7 October 1802 Edinburgh, Scotland
- Died: 29 August 1875 (aged 72) Old Windsor, Sunningdale, England
- Spouse: Mary Arbuthnot (m. 1832; died 1859)
- Relations: William U. Arbuthnot (brother); Robert Arbuthnot (uncle); Charles R. Arbuthnot (nephew); George G. Arbuthnot (nephew)
- Children: George Arbuthnot; Mary Arbuthnot
- Parent(s): Sir William Arbuthnot, 1st Baronet; Anne Alves

John Alves Arbuthnot of Coworth House (7 October 1802 – 29 August 1875) was a British banker, co-founder of Arbuthnot Latham, a private bank.

== Early life ==
Arbuthnot was born on 7 October 1802 at Queen Street in Edinburgh, Scotland into Clan Arbuthnott. He was the second son of Sir William Arbuthnot, 1st Baronet (1766–1829) and Anne Alves (d. 1846). His elder brother was Sir Robert Keith Arbuthnot, 2nd Baronet. Among his younger siblings were George Clerk Arbuthnot (father of Charles Ramsay Arbuthnot), Archibald Francis Arbuthnot (who married Hon. Gertrude Sophia Gough, daughter of the 1st Viscount Gough, father of Maj.-Gen. William Arbuthnot and Sir George Gough Arbuthnot), William Urquhart Arbuthnot (a member of the Council of India) and James Edward Arbuthnot. His father served as Lord Provost of Edinburgh and Lord Lieutenant of the City of Edinburgh.

His maternal grandfather was John Alves, Esq., of Shipland, Inverness-shire. His paternal grandparents were Robert Keith Arbuthnot, FRSE of Haddo Rattray, and Mary Urquhart of Cromarty. Among his extended family were uncles, George Arbuthnot, 1st of Elderslie, and Robert Arbuthnot.

== Career ==
On 13 May 1833, Arbuthnot and Alfred Latham co-founded Arbuthnot Latham at 33 Great St Helen's, Lime Street (near The Gherkin) in the City of London. Originally starting as a general merchant business, it soon began involving itself in finance and lending operations. He also served as a director of the London Assurance Company and of the London and Colonial Bank.

A Justice of the Peace for Berkshire, he also served as High Sheriff of Berkshire in 1873.

== Personal life ==
In 1832, Arbuthnot was married to his cousin, Mary Arbuthnot (1812–1859), a daughter of George Arbuthnot, Esq., of Elderslie, Surrey, and Elizabeth "Eliza" (née Fraser) Arbuthnot (a daughter of Donald Fraser). Among her siblings were sisters Jane Arbuthnot (wife of George Gough, 2nd Viscount Gough), Laura Arbuthnot (wife of Sir William Fitzwilliam Lenox-Conyngham), and brother William Reierson Arbuthnot. Together, they lived at Coworth Park, Old Windsor, Sunningdale, and were the parents of eleven children:

- William Arbuthnot (1833–1896), who married Adolphine Eliza Macleod Lecot, daughter of Edward Lecot, in 1858. After her death, he married Margaret Rosa Campbell, daughter of John Campbell, 5th of Knockbury and 9th of Kilberry and Rosa MacBean, in 1865.
- Eliza Jane Arbuthnot (1834–1838), who died young.
- George Arbuthnot (1836–1912), an MP for Hereford; he married Caroline Emma Nepean Aitchison, daughter of Capt. Andrew Nepean Aitchison.
- Anne Arbuthnot (1838–1909), who died unmarried.
- Mary Arbuthnot (1840–1930), who died unmarried.
- Florence Arbuthnot (1841–1932), who died unmarried.
- Jane Arbuthnot (1841–1891)
- Alice Magdalen Arbuthnot (1843–1869), who died unmarried.
- Laura Gertrude Arbuthnot (1845–1852), who died young.
- Charles George Arbuthnot (1846–1928), a director of the Bank of England and Lieutenant of the City of London; he died unmarried.
- Hugh Lyttleton Arbuthnot (1851–1929), who married Elizabeth Fountaine Walker, daughter of Fountaine Walker and Adamina Maxwell Hunter, in 1879. After her death, he married Justine Henrietta Ross, daughter of Colin George Ross, in 1922.

Arbuthnot died at his home in Sunningdale on 29 August 1875, reportedly worth £400,000.

=== Descendants ===
Through his son George, he was a grandfather of, among others, John Bernard Arbuthnot, who married Olive Blake (the only daughter of Sir Henry Arthur Blake and Edith Bernal Osborne, sister of the Duchess of St Albans), and Dorothy Gertrude Arbuthnot (who married Brig.-Gen. Hugh Frederick Bateman-Champain).

Through his youngest son Hugh, he was a grandfather of Alice Maud Arbuthnot, who married Brig.-Gen. Sir Dalrymple Arbuthnot, 5th Baronet, parents of Maj. Sir Robert Dalrymple Arbuthnot, 6th Baronet and Sir Hugh FitzGerald Arbuthnot, 7th Baronet.
