= William Arbuthnot =

William Arbuthnot or Arbuthnott may refer to:

- Sir William Arbuthnot, 1st Baronet (1766–1829), Lord Provost of Edinburgh
- Sir William Arbuthnot, 3rd Baronet (1831–1889), major in the 18th Hussars
- William Arbuthnot (British Army officer) (1838–1893), Major General in the 14th Hussars
- Sir William Arbuthnot Lane, 1st Baronet (1856–1943), surgeon
- Sir William Arbuthnot Lane, 2nd Baronet (1897–1972), actor and producer
- Sir William Arbuthnot, 2nd Baronet (1950–2021)
- William Reierson Arbuthnot (1826–1913), British businessman and legislator
- William Urquhart Arbuthnot (1807–1874), British administrator in India
