= William Urquhart Arbuthnot =

Scottish administrator in India (1807–1874)

- Born: 24 March 1807; Edinburgh, Scotland
- Died: 11 December 1874 (aged 67); London, England
- Education: Royal High School, Edinburgh; East India Company College
- Employer(s): East India Company; Council of India, Arbuthnot & Co.
- Title: Member of the Council of India
- Term: 1858–1874
- Spouse: Elizabeth "Eliza" Jane Taylor (m. 1834; died 1874)
- Parents: Sir William Arbuthnot, 1st Baronet (father); Anne Alves (mother)

William Urquhart Arbuthnot (24 March 1807 – 11 December 1874) was a Scottish administrator in India.

== Early life ==
Arbuthnot was born on 24 March 1807 in Edinburgh, Scotland into Clan Arbuthnott. He was the fifth son of Sir William Arbuthnot, 1st Baronet (1766–1829) and Anne Alves (d. 1846). His siblings included Sir Robert Arbuthnot, 2nd Baronet, John A. Arbuthnot, George Clerk Arbuthnot (father of Charles Ramsay Arbuthnot), Archibald Francis Arbuthnot (who married Hon. Gertrude Sophia Gough, daughter of the 1st Viscount Gough, father of Maj.-Gen. William Arbuthnot and Sir George Gough Arbuthnot), and James Edward Arbuthnot. His father served as Lord Provost of Edinburgh and Lord Lieutenant of the City of Edinburgh.

His maternal grandfather was John Alves, Esq., of Shipland, Inverness-shire. His paternal grandparents were Robert Keith Arbuthnot, FRSE of Haddo Rattray, and Mary Urquhart of Cromarty. Among his extended family were uncles, George Arbuthnot, 1st of Elderslie, and Robert Arbuthnot.

He was educated at the Royal High School, Edinburgh and the East India Company College, Haileybury.

== Career ==
Joining the East India Company, he went to Madras in 1826, eventually becoming the agent to the Governor at Vizagapatam. He resigned from the service in 1846, after which he joined the firm of Arbuthnot & Co. at Madras. He retired to England in 1838.

In 1858, he was one of the first persons chosen by the Crown to fill seats on the new Council of India, on which he served until his death in 1874. On several occasions, he declined appointment as finance minister in India.

== Personal life ==
On 2 June 1834, he married Elizabeth "Eliza" Jane Taylor (1815–1892), a daughter of Gen. Sir Henry George Andrew Taylor and Eliza Maughan. Together, they lived at Brigden Place in Bexley in Kent, and were the parents of:

- William Henry Arbuthnot (1835–1888), who married Mary Pearson Turner, a daughter of Wright Turner, in 1875.
- Eliza Taylor Arbuthnot (1837–1894), who married the mathematician William Spottiswoode, a partner in the printing and publishing firm Eyre & Spottiswoode who was the son of Andrew Spottiswoode.
- Mary Charlotte Arbuthnot (1841–1897), who married Judge Arthur Brandreth of the Chief Court of the Punjab, in 1868.
- Frederick George Arbuthnot (1845–1910), who died unmarried.
- Helen Ellen Arbuthnot (1850–1929), who died unmarried.
- Louisa Arbuthnot (1852–1852), who died young.
- Reginald James Hugh Arbuthnot (1853–1917), a coffee broker and amateur cricketer who died unmarried.
- Madeline Arbuthnot (1856–1858), who died young.

Arbuthnot died in London on 11 December 1874.
