= Sir Robert Arbuthnot, 2nd Baronet =

Scottish civil servant (1801–1873)

Arms of the Arbuthnot baronets of Edinburgh

Sir Robert Keith Arbuthnot, 2nd Baronet FRSE (9 September 1801 – 4 March 1873) was a Scottish civil servant who served in India.

== Early life ==
Arbuthnot was born in Scotland on 9 September 1801. He was the eldest son of Sir William Arbuthnot, 1st Baronet (1766–1829), and Anne Alves (d. 1846). Among his younger siblings were John A. Arbuthnot, George Clerk Arbuthnot (father of Charles Ramsay Arbuthnot), Archibald Francis Arbuthnot (who married Hon. Gertrude Sophia Gough, daughter of the 1st Viscount Gough, father of Maj.-Gen. William Arbuthnot and Sir George Gough Arbuthnot), William Urquhart Arbuthnot (a member of the Council of India) and James Edward Arbuthnot. His father served as Lord Provost of Edinburgh and Lord Lieutenant of the City of Edinburgh.

His maternal grandfather was John Alves, Esq., of Shipland, Inverness-shire. His paternal grandparents were Robert Keith Arbuthnot, FRSE, of Haddo Rattray, and Mary Urquhart of Cromarty. Among his extended family were uncles, George Arbuthnot, 1st of Elderslie, and Robert Arbuthnot.

== Career ==
Arbuthnot entered the Bombay Civil Service and remained with them from 1819 to 1838. Arbuthnot succeeded to his father's baronetcy on 18 September 1829. He later served as collector and Magistrate of Ahmedabad, India. In Scotland, he was the Secretary to the Board of Trustees and Manufactures.

== Personal life ==
On 20 March 1828, he married Anne Fitzgerald (c. 1808–1882), daughter of Field Marshal Sir John Forster FitzGerald and the former Charlotte Hazen. Together, they had seven children:

- Sir William Wedderburn Arbuthnot, 3rd Baronet (1831–1889), a Major in the 18th Hussars; he married Alice Margaret Tompson, a daughter of Rev. Matthew Carrier Tompson, in 1863.
- Forster Fitzgerald Arbuthnot (1833–1901), a prominent orientalist who married, as her second husband, Elinor Stirling, daughter of Adm. Sir James Stirling, Governor of Western Australia and widow of James Guthrie, 4th Baron of Craigie, in 1879.
- Charlotte d'Ende Arbuthnot (1836–1904), who married the Rev. Charles Hall Raikes in 1863.
- Robert Keith Arbuthnot (1838–1894), a clergyman who married Mary Agnes Vaughan, daughter of Rev. Canon Edward Thomas Vaughan in 1868.
- Henrietta Anne Arbuthnot (1840–1897), who died unmarried.
- John Alves Henry Arbuthnot (1842–1903), a banker who died unmarried at Brieg, Switzerland.
- FitzGerald Hay Arbuthnot (1849–1894)

Sir Robert died on 4 March 1873, aged 71, in Florence, Italy.

=== Descendants ===
Through his daughter Charlotte, he was a grandfather of Arthur Edward Harrington Raikes (1867–1915), the British Army officer who served as acting prime minister, vizier and first minister to numerous Sultans of Zanzibar.

Baronetage of the United Kingdom
Preceded by William Arbuthnot	Baronet (of Edinburgh); 1829–1873	Succeeded by William Wedderburn Arbuthnot
