= Robert Arbuthnot =

Robert Arbuthnot or Arbuthnott may refer to:

- Robert Arbuthnot, 1st Viscount of Arbuthnott (bef. 1625 –1655)
- Robert Arbuthnot, 2nd Viscount of Arbuthnott (died 1682)
- Robert Arbuthnot, 3rd Viscount of Arbuthnott (1661–1694)
- Robert Arbuthnot (auditor) (1669–1727), Auditor of the Exchequer in Scotland
- Robert Arbuthnot, 4th Viscount of Arbuthnott (1686–1710)
- Keith Arbuthnott, 15th Viscount of Arbuthnott (Robert Keith Arbuthnott, 1897–1966), British Army general
- Robert Arbuthnot of Haddo (1728–1803), trustee of Board of Manufactures
- Robert Arbuthnot (Ceylon) (c. 1761–1809), British soldier and diplomat
- Robert Arbuthnot (British Army officer) (1773–1853), British Army general
- Sir Robert Arbuthnot, 2nd Baronet (1801–1873), Scottish civil servant
- Sir Robert Arbuthnot, 4th Baronet (1864–1916), British Royal Navy admiral
- Sir Robert Dalrymple Arbuthnot, 6th Baronet (1919–1944); see Arbuthnot baronets
