= Gerald Arbuthnot =

British politician

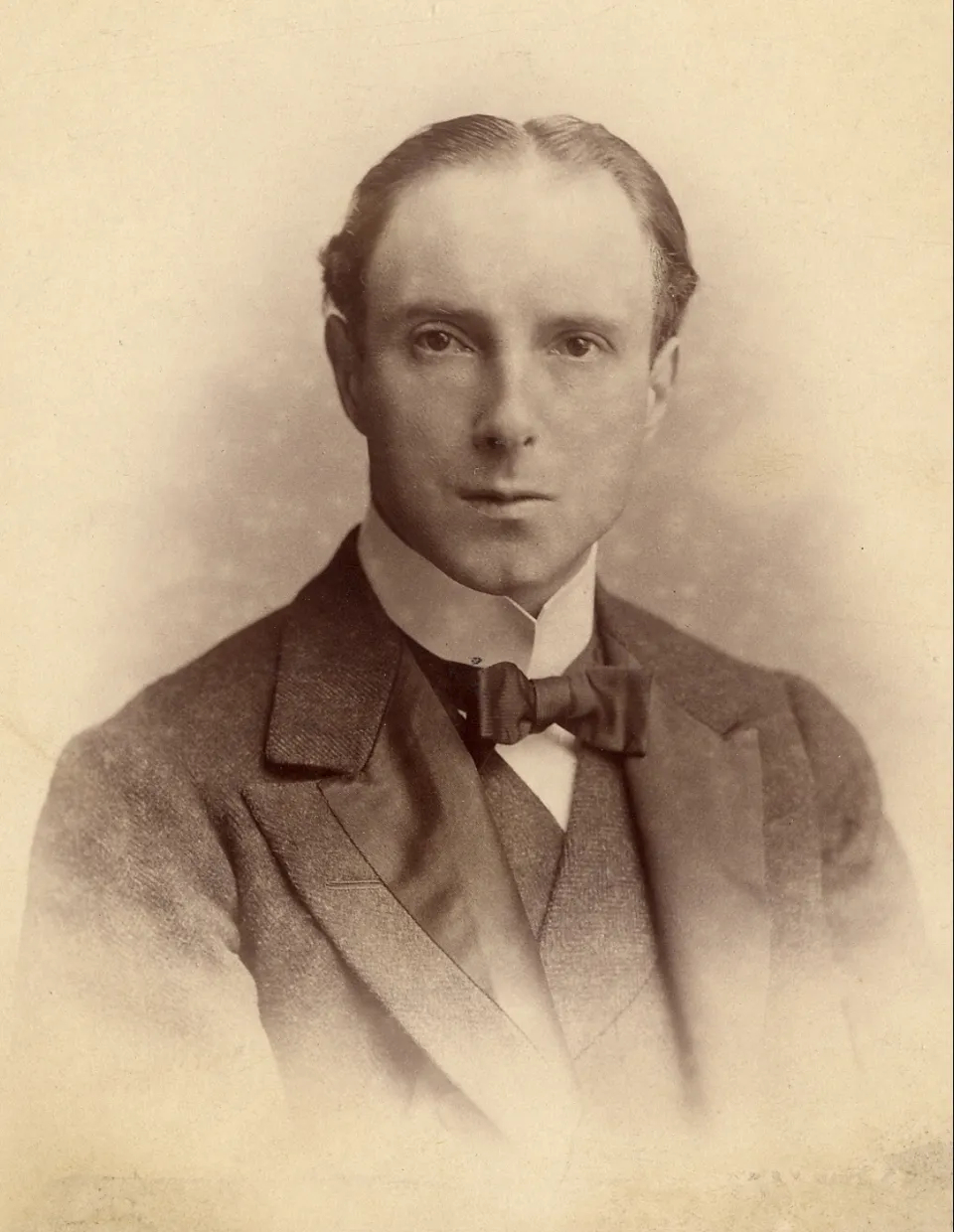

Member of Parliament for Burnley
- In office 15 January 1910 – 28 November 1910
- Preceded by: Frederick Maddison
- Succeeded by: Philip Morrell

Personal details
- Born: 19 December 1872
- Died: 25 September 1916 (aged 43) Fricourt, France
- Resting place: Citadel New Military Cemetery, Fricourt
- Party: Conservative
- Spouse: (Mary Johanna) Dulcie Antoinette Oppenheim
- Children: 3 daughters
- Parent(s): William Arbuthnot; Selina Moncreiffe
- Occupation: Politician

Military service
- Allegiance: United Kingdom
- Branch/service: Royal Navy (1886 – 1891, 1914 – 1915); British Army (1915 – 1916)
- Rank: Midshipman (RN) Lieutenant (RNVR); Second Lieutenant (Army)
- Unit: Royal Navy; Royal Naval Volunteer Reserve; 2nd Battalion, Grenadier Guards (Army)
- Battles/wars: First World War: Battle of Ypres; Battle of the Somme †

Gerald Archibald Arbuthnot (19 December 1872 – 25 September 1916) was a British naval officer, soldier and Conservative Party politician.

== Early life ==
The son of Major General William Arbuthnot and Selina Moncreiffe, he was vice-chancellor of the Primrose League.

== Political career ==
Arbuthnot was a private secretary to the Board of Agriculture from 1895 to 1899, assistant private secretary to the President of the Local Government Board in 1901 and 1902 and assistant private secretary to the Chief Secretary for Ireland in 1905 and 1906. Between January and December 1910, he was Member of Parliament (MP) for Burnley. He also was the last conservative MP from Burnley, up until 2019.

== Military service ==
In the First World War, he served in the Grenadier Guards and reached the rank of second lieutenant, having been made a lieutenant in the service of the Royal Naval Volunteer Reserve already in 1914. He fought in the Battle of Ypres. Arbuthnot died aged 43, killed in action during the Battle of the Somme. He was buried at Citadel New Military Cemetery, Fricourt. In November 2018, Arbuthnot's name was added to the UK Parliament's World War One memorial, after a historian at the History of Parliament Trust noticed his name was missing.

== Personal life ==
He married (Mary Johanna) Dulcie Antoinette Oppenheim, daughter of Charles Augustus Oppenheim, on 6 February 1894. They had three daughters, one of whom, Cynthia Isabelle Theresa, married rower and financier Ian Fairbairn.

Parliament of the United Kingdom
Preceded by Frederick Maddison	Member of Parliament for Burnley; January 1910 – December 1910	Succeeded by Philip Morrell
