= Sir William Arbuthnot, 1st Baronet =

Scottish landowner and politician (1766–1829)

Sir William Arbuthnot, Bt FRSE
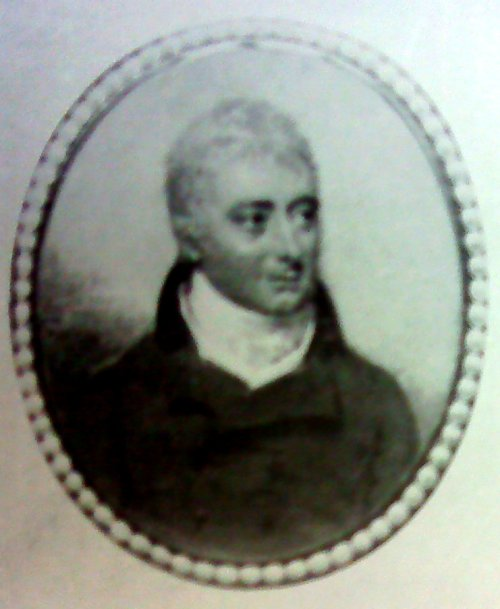

Lord Provost of Edinburgh
- In office 1821–1822
- Preceded by: John Manderston
- Succeeded by: Alexander Henderson
- In office 1815–1816
- Preceded by: Sir John Marjoribanks, Bt
- Succeeded by: Kincaid Mackenzie

Personal details
- Born: William Arbuthnot; 24 December 1766 Scotland
- Died: 18 September 1829 (aged 62)
- Spouse: Anne Alves (m. 1800; died 1829)
- Parent(s): Robert Keith Arbuthnot; Mary Urquhart
- Occupation: Landowner, Politician

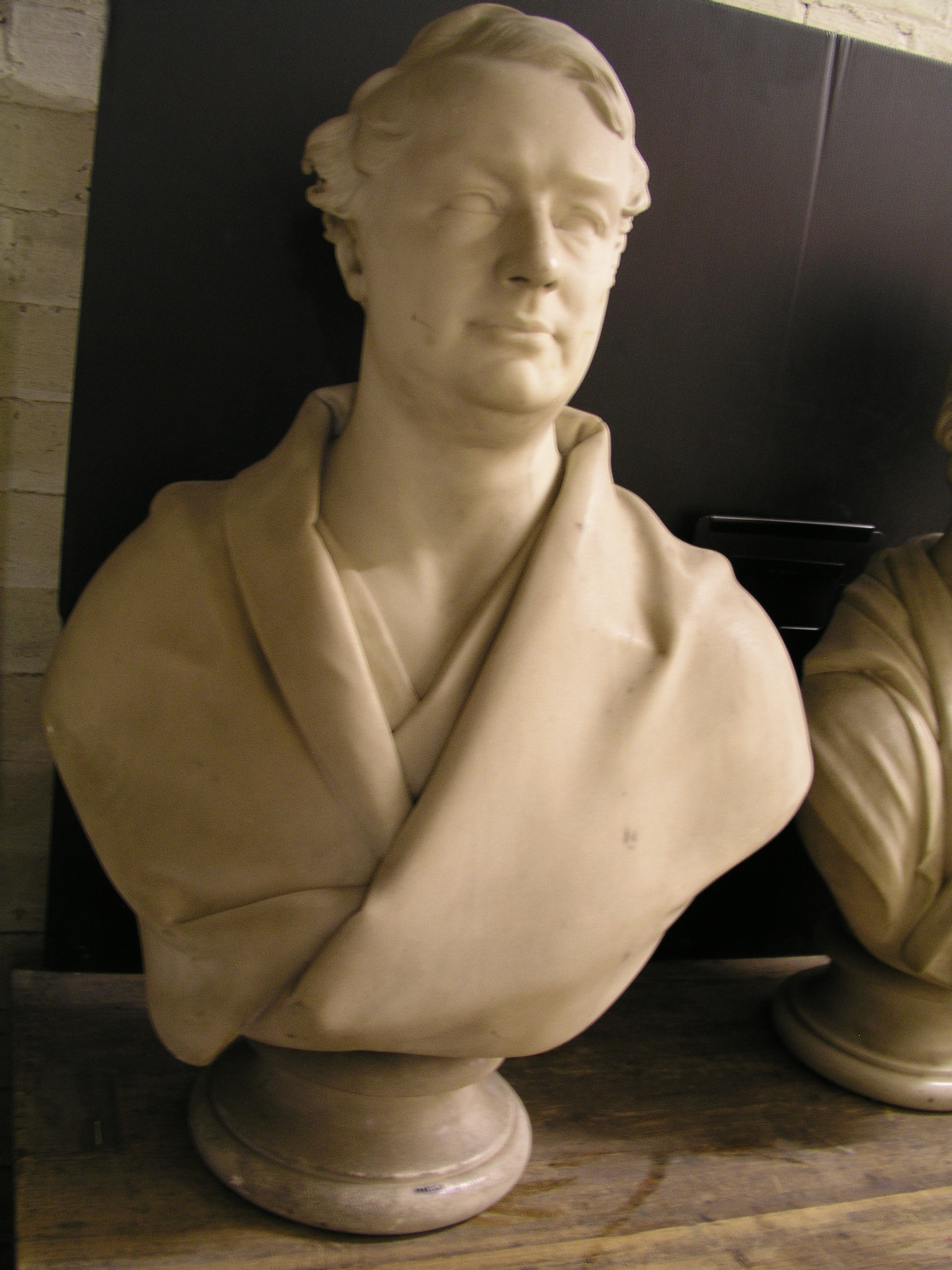
Sir William Arbuthnot, 1st Baronet

Arms of the Arbuthnot baronets of Edinburgh

Sir William Arbuthnot, 1st Baronet of Edinburgh FRSE (24 December 1766 – 18 September 1829) was a Scottish landowner and politician. He served as Lord Provost of Edinburgh and Lord Lieutenant of the City of Edinburgh.

== Early life ==
William was the son of Robert Keith Arbuthnot, 2nd of Haddo Rattray (1728–1803), and Mary Urquhart of Cromarty. He was the elder brother of George Arbuthnot, 1st of Elderslie, and younger brother of Robert Arbuthnot. His sister, Elizabeth Barbara Arbuthnot, married Sir John Hunter, Consul-General to Spain.

His father was the third son of Robert Arbuthnot, 1st of Haddo-Rattray, and the former Mary Petrie. His maternal grandparents were John Urquhart of Craigston and Cromarty and Jane Urquhart (a daughter of William Urquhart of Meldrum and Mary Forbes).

He attended the Edinburgh High School from 1773 to 1778.

== Career ==
He was elected a Fellow of the Royal Society of Edinburgh in January 1800, being proposed by John Playfair.

Arbuthnot managed a plantation on the island of Carriacou, in the Grenadines, on behalf of his uncle, William Urquhart of Craigston.

Sir William served twice as Lord Provost of Edinburgh, from 1815 to 1817 and from 1821 to 1823. On the death of his father, he became Secretary of the Board of Trustees for the Encouragement of the Manufactures and Fisheries of Scotland, a post later held by Sir Thomas Dick Lauder, Bt.

Traditionally a knighthood was conferred on Lord Provosts, but Arbuthnot was created a baronet on 24 August 1822 (by Letters Patent on 3 April 1823) on the occasion of a banquet given by the Magistrates and Town Council of Edinburgh in honour of King George IV during his visit to Edinburgh.

In his capacity as Lord Provost he opened the Edinburgh School of Arts on Adam Square on 16 October 1821.

Sir William matriculated Arms with the Lord Lyon King of Arms in 1822. Unusually, for a baronet, the arms include supporters, probably because he had accomplished two stints as Lord Provost.

== Personal life ==
On 13 September 1800, Arbuthnot married Anne Alves (d. 1846), daughter of Helen Baillie and John Alves of Shipland. They had ten children, including:

- Sir Robert Keith Arbuthnot, 2nd Baronet (1801–1873), who married Anne FitzGerald, daughter of Field Marshal Sir John Forster FitzGerald, in 1828.
- John Alves Arbuthnot (1802–1875) of Coworth Park who married his cousin, Mary Arbuthnot, a daughter of George Arbuthnot, Esq., of Elderslie, in 1832.
- George Clerk Arbuthnot (1803–1876), who married Agnes Rait, daughter of John Rait in 1837. After her death, he married Caroline Ramsay Hay, daughter of James Hay and Lady Mary Ramsay (a daughter of the 8th Earl of Dalhousie), in 1845.
- Archibald Francis Arbuthnot (1805–1879), who married Hon. Gertrude Sophia Gough, daughter of the Hugh Gough, 1st Viscount Gough in 1837.
- William Urquhart Arbuthnot (1807–1874), who married Eliza Jane Taylor, daughter of Gen. Sir Henry George Andrew Taylor, in 1834.
- James Edward Arbuthnot (1809–1868), who married Harriet Frances Staveley, daughter of Gen. William Staveley, in 1837.
- Henry Dundas Arbuthnot (1811–1847), who died unmarried.
- Mary Arbuthnot (1814–1838), who died unmarried.
- Elizabeth Helen Arbuthnot (1819–1825), who died young.
- Ann Arbuthnot (1822–1900), who married Lt.-Col. Hugh Inglis, son of George Inglis of Kingsmill and Helen Alves, in 1849.

Sir William died on 18 September 1829. He was buried in St John's Episcopal Churchyard in Edinburgh at the west end of Princes Street.

=== Descendants ===
Through his eldest son Robert, he was a grandfather of Major Sir William Wedderburn Arbuthnot, 3rd Baronet, and Forster Fitzgerald Arbuthnot.

Through his second son John, he was a grandfather of George Arbuthnot, an MP for Hereford.

Through his son George, he was a grandfather of Charles Ramsay Arbuthnot.

Through his son Archibald, he was a grandfather of Maj.-Gen. William Arbuthnot and Sir George Gough Arbuthnot.

== See also ==
- Court of the Lord Lyon

Political offices
Preceded by Sir John Marjoribanks, Bt	Lord Provost of Edinburgh; 1815–1816	Succeeded by Kincaid Mackenzie
Preceded by John Manderston	Lord Provost of Edinburgh; 1821–1822	Succeeded by Alexander Henderson
Baronetage of the United Kingdom
New creation	Baronet (of Edinburgh); 1823–1829	Succeeded by Robert Keith Arbuthnot
