= John Manderston =

Scottish pharmacist

John Manderston or Manderson (c.1760–1831) was a 19th-century Scottish pharmacist who served as Lord Provost of Edinburgh from 1819 to 1821.

== Life ==
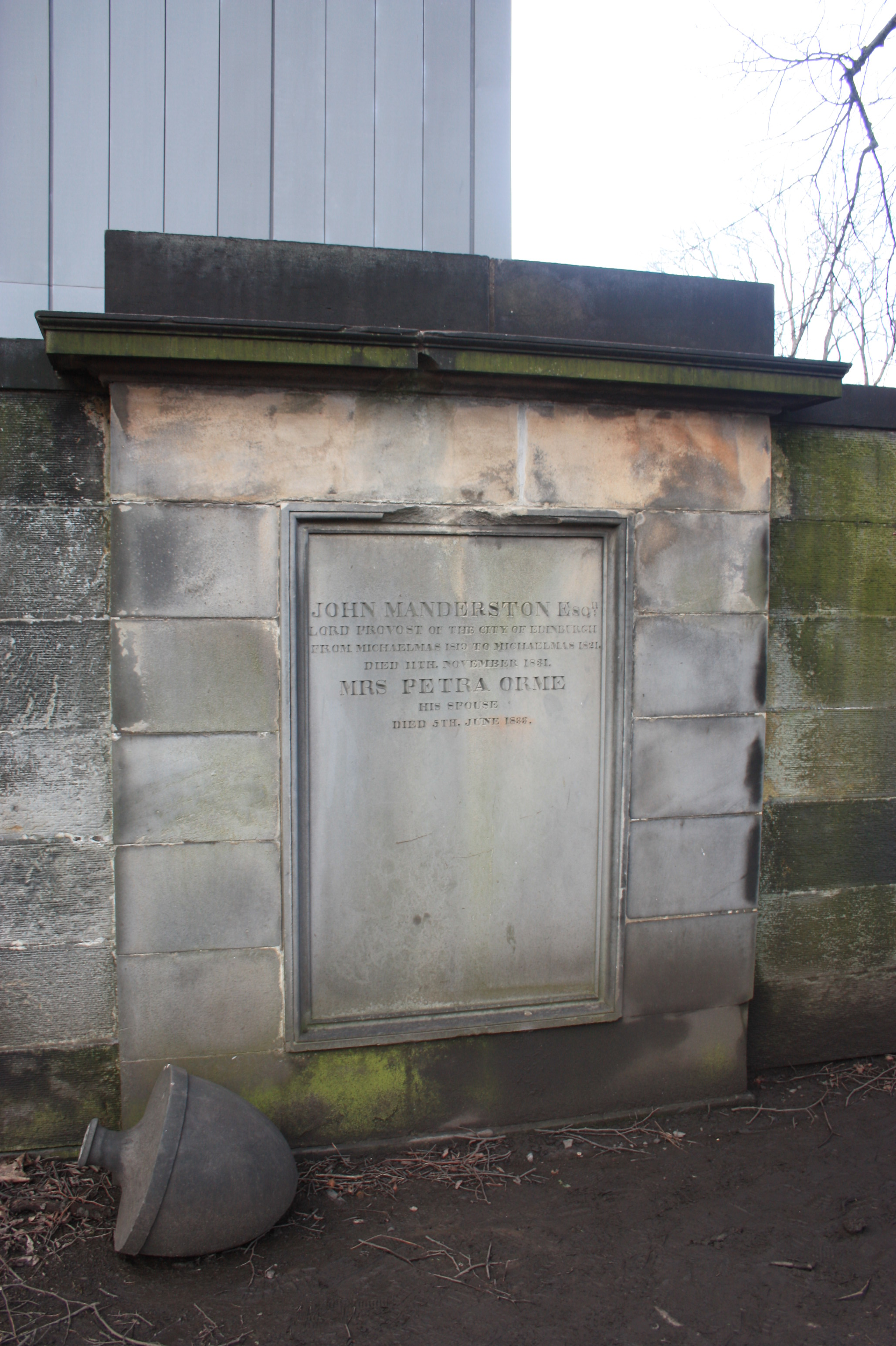
The grave of John Manderston, Greyfriars Kitkyard

He was born in Edinburgh in the late 18th century, the son of William Manderson, a brewer in the Canongate. In 1800 he is listed as a druggist with a shop at 21 Rose Street in Edinburgh's First New town just behind Princes Street with his house opposite his shop.

He 1819 he succeeded Kincaid Mackenzie as Lord Provost of Edinburgh. He then moved house to 1 Abercromby Place in Edinburgh's Second New Town.

In 1817 he is listed as Treasurer of Edinburgh Town Council.

In 1821 he was succeeded in turn by William Arbuthnot.

He died in Edinburgh on 11 November 1831, then described as a "banker". He is buried in Greyfriars Kirkyard in Edinburgh. The grave lies on the north (lower) boundary of the western extension.

== Family ==
He was married to Petra Orme (died 1833). She is thought to be the daughter of George Orme, a grocer in the Lauriston district of south Edinburgh.
