= Dalrymple Arbuthnot =

British Army general

Brigadier-General Sir Dalrymple Arbuthnot Bt CMG DSO JP
- Born: 1 April 1867
- Died: 31 March 1941 (aged 73)
- Relatives: Sir William Arbuthnot, 3rd Baronet (father)
- Military career
- Allegiance: United Kingdom
- Branch: British Army
- Service years: 1886–1920
- Rank: Brigadier-General
- Unit: Royal Artillery
- Commands: 44th (Howitzer) Brigade Royal Field Artillery
- Conflicts: Chitral Expedition; Second Boer War; First World War
- Awards: Companion of the Order of St Michael and St George; Companion of the Distinguished Service Order; Mentioned in Despatches (9); Order of Saints Maurice and Lazarus (Italy)

Brigadier-General Sir Dalrymple Arbuthnot, 5th Baronet, CMG, DSO, JP (1 April 1867 – 31 March 1941) was a British baronet and Army officer.

== Early life ==
The second son of Sir William Arbuthnot, 3rd Baronet and Alice Margaret Thompson, and younger brother of the Sir Robert Arbuthnot, 4th Baronet, he was educated at the Royal Military Academy Woolwich.

== Military career ==
Arbuthnot was commissioned in the Royal Artillery on 17 February 1886. He served in the Chitral Expedition of 1895 in the North-West Frontier Province, where he was awarded a medal with clasp, and the following year was promoted to captain on 30 September 1896. He later served in the Second Boer War in South Africa from 1899 to 1902, being mentioned in despatches. He was promoted to major on 28 October 1901, and in January the following year was appointed an assistant staff officer for colonial forces in South Africa. After the end of the war in June 1902, Arbuthnot stayed in South Africa for several months, returning home on the SS Scot in November.

By the time the First World War broke out, Arbuthnot had risen to lieutenant colonel and was Officer Commanding of the 44th (Howitzer) Brigade Royal Field Artillery, based at Brighton. On mobilisation, the brigade formed part of the artillery of the 2nd Division in the original British Expeditionary Force. Arbuthnot commanded the Brigade until May 1915, when he became Commander Royal Artillery of the newly formed 28th Division. Although the division spent only ten months on the Western Front before re-deploying to Salonika, it took part in several engagements at Second Battle of Ypres and in the Battle of Loos.

Arbuthnot spent much of the rest of the war away from the Western Front. He was Brigadier General, Royal Artillery of the XII Corps at Salonika from January to July 1916, Commander Royal Artillery of the 23rd Division in France and Italy from January 1917, when he was seconded from his regiment and granted the temporary rank of brigadier general on 17 January, to July 1918, and Brigadier General, Royal Artillery of the XXIII Corps, Home Forces, from July 1918 to the Armistice. During the war, he was mentioned in despatches eight times; appointed a Companion of the Distinguished Service Order, and a Companion of the Order of St Michael and St George in 1915; and made brevet colonel in 1916. He was also a member of the Italian Order of Saints Maurice and Lazarus, and was made an honorary brigadier general in 1920.

In the first years of the Second World War, Arbuthnot served with the Civil Defence.

== Family ==
Arms of the Arbuthnot baronets of Edinburgh

On 15 January 1918, he married Alice Maud Arbuthnot, daughter of Hugh Lyttleton Arbuthnot. They had two children:

- Major Sir Robert Dalrymple Arbuthnot, 6th Baronet (1919–1944)
- Sir Hugh FitzGerald Arbuthnot, 7th Baronet (1922–1983)

Arbuthnot succeeded to the baronetcy on 31 May 1916, after his brother was killed in the Battle of Jutland.

== Notes ==
Baronetage of the United Kingdom
Preceded by Robert Keith Arbuthnot	Baronet (of Edinburgh); 1916–1941	Succeeded by Robert Dalrymple Arbuthnot
