= John Hunter (consul-general) =

British statesman

Sir John Hunter (13 February 1751 – 3 July 1816) was a British statesman serving as Consul-General in Madras, India, and both Seville and St Lucar, Spain.

Born in Edinburgh, Scotland to James Hunter, Hunter married Margaret Congalton in 1787, daughter of Charles Congalton. Upon her death in 1791, he married Dame Elizabeth Barbara Arbuthnot in 1793, daughter of Robert Keith Arbuthnot FRSE (1728-1803) of Haddo Rattray, and sister of Sir William Arbuthnot, 1st Baronet of Edinburgh FRSE.

He was knighted by the Prince Regent on 10 December 1813.

He is the father, through his second marriage, of Margaret Congalton Hunter, spouse of Captain Basil Hall.
