= HMS Viper (1807) =

History

United Kingdom
- Name: Princess Charlotte
- Builder: Cowes
- Launched: 1805
- Fate: Sold 1807

United Kingdom
- Acquired: 1807 by purchase
- Fate: Foundered February 1809

General characteristics
- Tons burthen: 81 (bm)
- Length: 57 ft 10 in (17.6 m) (Keel)
- Beam: 18 ft 7 in (5.7 m)
- Depth of hold: 8 ft 5 in (2.6 m)
- Sail plan: Schooner
- Complement: 25
- Armament: 4 × 12-pounder carronades

HMS Viper was launched at Cowes in 1805 as the mercantile schooner Princess Charlotte. The Royal Navy purchased her in 1807. Lieutenant William Towning commissioned her. On 9 (or 18) February 1809 she sailed from Cadiz for Gibraltar. She never arrived and was presumed to have foundered with all hands.

She was carrying as a passenger Robert Arbuthnot, the former Chief Secretary in Ceylon.
