= Henry Angest =

Swiss banker

- Born: 6 July 1940 (age 86); Switzerland
- Education: University of Basel
- Occupations: President, Arbuthnot Latham; Chairman and CEO, Arbuthnot Banking Group plc
- Spouse: Dorothy Angest

Sir Henry Angest (born 6 July 1940) is a Swiss-born London-based banker and political donor. He is the president of Arbuthnot Latham, a merchant bank in the City of London and chairman and CEO of its parent, Arbuthnot Banking Group.

== Early life ==
Henry Angest was born in July 1940 in Switzerland. He attended the University of Basel.

== Career ==
Angest is the chairman and CEO of Arbuthnot Latham, a private bank in the City of London.

Angest was on the board of directors of the Parity Group from 1997 to 2002. He has served as Master of the Worshipful Company of International Bankers.

== Political activity ==
Angest has made large donations to the Conservative Party, where he was treasurer. He has also donated to William Hague, Chris Grayling, and Murdo Fraser. He has been invited to private dinners with British Prime Minister David Cameron at 10 Downing Street and Chequers.

He has made donations to The Atlantic Bridge, The Freedom Association, and Global Britain, an anti-European Union think tank.

In 2015, he was knighted in Queen's Birthday Honours List "for political services". As a result, if he were to become a British citizen then he would be styled Sir Henry Angest.

== Personal life ==
He is married to Dorothy Angest. In 2010, he was worth an estimated £45 million.
