= Patrick Macfadyen =

Scottish businessman, banker and politician

Patrick Macfadyen (16 May 1841 – 20 October 1906) was a Scottish businessman, banker and politician. He committed suicide in 1906 in London due to the crash of Arbuthnot & Co.

== Early life ==
Macfadyen was born in Campbeltown, Argyll and Bute, Scotland, to Archibald Mcfadyen and Margaret McKinlay. On completion of his studies, Macfadyen started a business of his own.

== Career ==
Macfadyen initially operated from Madras and achieved considerable success. He was nominated to the Madras Legislative Council for the terms 1874–75 and 1875–76. He was also elected as the President of the Madras Chamber of Commerce in 1875.

In 1876, Macfadyen was appointed to the newly established executive committee of management of the Madras School of Arts.

Macfadyen traded in West Indian sugar and owned businesses in Java. He even invested in railroads in the United States of America. Based on his connections in Madras, Macfadyen established P. Macfayden & Co., the London branch of the Arbuthnot Bank. That firm is still remembered for the pooling arrangements in cross-border insolvencies.

== Business failure ==
In 1906, Arbuthnot & Co and P. Macfayden & Co. failed. P. Macfayden & Co. had liabilities of £1,044,952 (£142 million as of 2023), of which £412,034 was unsecured, and assets of only £25,530. Arbuthnot & Co. likewise had £1,783,333 in liabilities (£2.42 billion as of 2023) and £474,000 in assets. The turnover was stated to be between £2–3 million per year.

== Death ==
Macfadyen committed suicide on Saturday, 20 October 1906, at age 65, by walking into a railway tunnel in Shoreditch near the Old Street station, Islington, as a train was approaching. The bank had been required to remit a sum of £50,000 (equivalent to £6,793,205 in 2023) before 20 October. It is generally believed that on the morning of 20 October, Macfayden received a telegram from Madras stating "Cannot remit any funds. Money still going out. We must stop payment on Monday". Sir George Arbuthnot, active partner of Arbuthnot & Co, was arrested following the bank's collapse.

Macfadyen was seen at the office until around 11 in the morning on Saturday. Initially, witnesses stated that he was "worried-looking when he left the bank" but there was no indication that he planned to harm himself, and his friends stated that they believed he wandered onto the train line absentmindedly. None of the railway officials at the Old Street Station reported seeing him walk off the platform and into the tunnel. At the inquest, however, other witnesses described Macfadyen as "completely unhinged" in his demeanour as he walked toward the train.

Ernest Wallace, manager of the firm, said he saw Macfadyen on the Saturday morning of his death, when he stopped by the office for approximately an hour. He was greatly worried about business matters and left a letter for him that stated, "October 20th – Dear Mr. Wallace, Enclosed from Arbuthnot and Co. is the last straw. I suppose must put down the catastrophe our endeavour to keep Arbuthnot and Co. going. Wills (solicitor) will advise you." He left a note for a female, which may or may not have been for his wife, who was in Australia at the time.

Several other business associates and old friends, including Sir Lewis McIver, testified at the inquest into Macfadyen's death with various stories about his recently distraught and altered behavior. The judge delivered a verdict of suicide while of unsound mind.

Macfadyen's suicide and the subsequent claims on his estate by creditors received significant coverage in the British media. It was reported that his body was found "cut in pieces" and he had been decapitated. Bankruptcy proceedings determined Macfadyen had business liabilities of £400,000 (£53.4 million as of 2023) and personal separate debt of £30,000 (£4.01 million as of 2023). Three months after his death, creditors had submitted 291 proofs of liability amounting to £282,340 (£37.7 million as of 2023).
