= HMS Orlando (1886) =

Cruiser of the Royal Navy

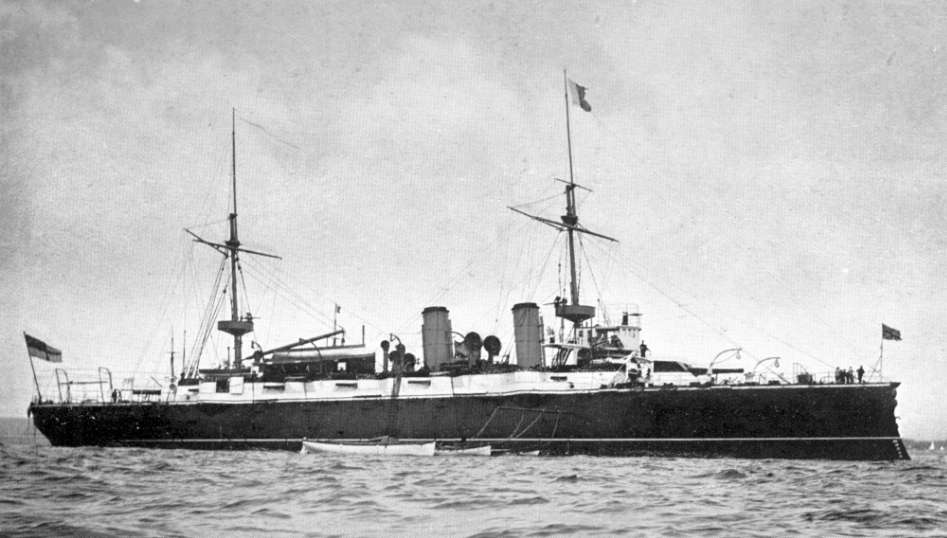

History

United Kingdom
- Name: HMS Orlando
- Builder: Palmers Shipbuilding and Iron Company, Jarrow
- Laid down: 23 April 1885
- Launched: 3 August 1886
- Fate: Sold for breaking up 11 July 1905

General characteristics
- Class & type: Orlando-class armoured cruiser
- Displacement: 5,600 long tons (5,700 t)
- Length: 300 ft (91 m) p/p
- Beam: 56 ft (17 m)
- Draught: 22.5 ft (6.9 m)
- Installed power: 5,500 hp (4,100 kW); 8,500 hp (6,300 kW) forced-draught
- Propulsion: 3-cylinder triple-extension steam engines; two shafts; 4 double-ended boilers
- Speed: 17 knots (31 km/h) natural draught; 18 knots (33 km/h) forced draught
- Range: 10,000 nautical miles (19,000 km) at 10 knots (19 km/h)
- Complement: 484
- Armament: 2 × BL 9.2-inch (233.7 mm) Mk V or VI guns (2 x 1); 10 × BL 6-inch (152.4 mm) guns (10 x 1); 6 × QF 6-pounder (57 mm) guns (6 × 1); 10 × QF 3-pounder (47 mm) Hotchkiss guns (10 × 1); 6 × 18-inch (450-mm) torpedo tubes (4 above water broadside, 1 bow and 1 stern submerged)
- Armour: Belt: 10 in (250 mm); Conning tower: 12 in (300 mm)

HMS Orlando was the lead ship of the Orlando class of first-class cruisers built in the yards of Palmers Shipbuilding and Iron Company, Jarrow and launched on 3 August 1886.

== Service history ==
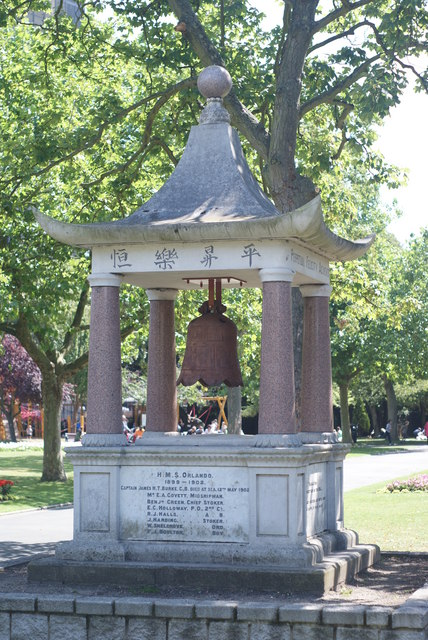
Memorial to HMS Orlando, Victoria Park, Portsmouth

She was commanded by Charles Ramsay Arbuthnot on the Australia Station from 1892 to 1895. In 1899 she was assigned to the China Station, Captain James Henry Thomas Burke in command. During the Boxer Rebellion in 1900, sailors from HMS Orlando formed part of the force led by Vice-Admiral Sir Edward Seymour attempting to relieve the British Legation in Beijing. A replica of a bell captured from the Taku Forts forms part of a memorial to HMS Orlando in Victoria Park, Portsmouth.

In late March 1902 she left Hong Kong for Singapore, arriving there on 6 April. After three weeks, she left Penang in late April, homebound, stopping at Colombo on 5 May, Aden on 14 May, Malta on 28 May, and Gibraltar on 2 June, before arriving at Portsmouth four days later. Captain Burke died at sea on 12 May 1902, during the journey, and was buried at Aden. Commander Philip Howard Colomb was in charge for the remainder of the journey. She paid off at Portsmouth on 25 July, and was placed in the B Division of the Fleet Reserve.

HMS Orlando was sold for scrapping on 11 July 1905 to Thos. W. Ward of Morecambe for £10,000.
