= Sir Robert Arbuthnot, 4th Baronet =

Royal Navy Rear Admiral (1864-1916)

Rear-Admiral Sir Robert Arbuthnot Bt KCB MVO
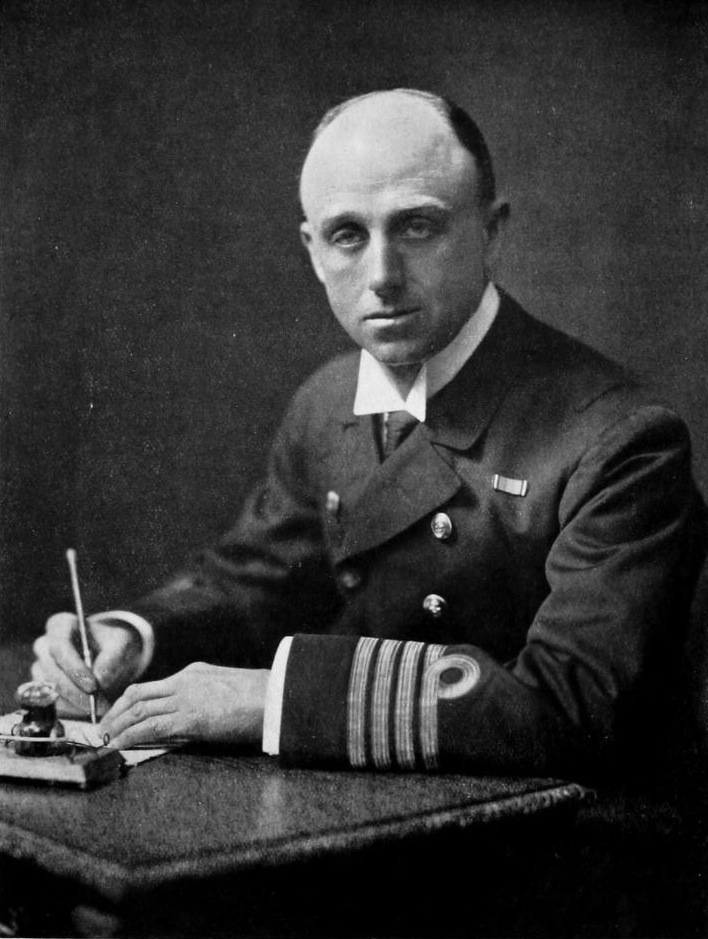
- Sir Robert Arbuthnot whilst he was a captain
- Born: 23 March 1864; Alderminster, Warwickshire, England
- Died: 31 May 1916 (aged 52); HMS Defence, North Sea, off Jutland
- Military career
- Allegiance: United Kingdom
- Branch: Royal Navy
- Service years: 1877–1916
- Rank: Rear-Admiral
- Commands: 1st Cruiser Squadron; First Destroyer Flotilla; HMS Lord Nelson
- Conflicts: First World War: Raid on Scarborough; Battle of Jutland †
- Awards: Knight Commander of the Order of the Bath; Member of the Royal Victorian Order

Sir Robert Arbuthnot, 4th Baronet
Motorcycle racing career statistics
Isle of Man TT career
TTs contested	1 (1908)
TT wins	0
TT podiums	1

Rear-Admiral Sir Robert Keith Arbuthnot, 4th Baronet, KCB, MVO (23 March 1864 – 31 May 1916) was a British Royal Navy officer during the First World War. He was killed at the Battle of Jutland, when the cruiser squadron he commanded came under heavy fire after a bold but ill-judged attack on the German battle fleet.

== Background ==
Born in Alderminster to Major Sir William Arbuthnot, 3rd Baronet and Alice Margaret Tompson, he succeeded to his father's baronetcy on 5 June 1889. In 1904, he was appointed a Member of the Royal Victorian Order.

Arbuthnot had been a rugby three-quarter back who captained the United Service team and played for Hampshire. He was a boxing champion, who after dinner might bring out boxing gloves and spar with his guests. On one occasion when two sailors were found to be seeking revenge for a punishment, he issued them with boxing gloves and proceeded to take on and knock down the pair. On another occasion when three of his men launched a surprise attack against him while ashore, two had to be taken away to hospital. He was 'almost certainly the only [admiral] who could be seen on the quarterdeck of the flagship doing three grand circles in succession on the horizontal bar'. An interfleet cross-country race was called "The Arbuthnot Trophy".

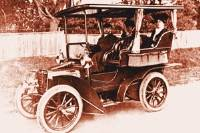
Sunbeam tonneau

He had a Sunbeam Tonneau and competed with it in the 1904 Bexhill Speed Trials. An enthusiastic member of the Motor Cycling Club, he kept his motorbike in his day cabin and engaged in long-distance endurance races. In 1908, he came third in the single-cylinder class of the Isle of Man TT, and an annual rally in the Isle of Man and a TT trophy for service members are named after him. He had been a member of the MCC since 1898, and had played for the club, United Services, and the Navy. There is also a hamlet and post office named after him in Saskatchewan.

He was married on 11 December 1897, to Lina MacLeay (1868–1935), daughter of Colonel Alexander Caldcleugh MacLeay. They had one daughter.

== Naval career ==
Arbuthnot entered the navy in 1877 as a cadet in the training ship Britannia.

Upon acquiring command rank, Arbuthnot quickly developed a reputation as a dedicated but highly inflexible and detail-obsessed martinet, with a passion for "the highest authoritarian standard of discipline, mercilessly enforced." Even by the strict disciplinary standards of the Royal Navy, Arbuthnot's zeal was unusual; in 1900 as executive officer of Royal Sovereign, Arbuthnot wrote and published A Battleship Commander's Order Book, containing some 300 pages of detailed standing orders for his crew, when a ship's Commander at this time would typically produce just a few pages of special instructions to act as an addendum to the standardized King's Regulations procedural manual. While the book remains a valuable source of historical information on details of life aboard a battleship at this time, it made Arbuthnot the butt of so many jokes from his contemporaries that he later allegedly requested it not be mentioned in his biographical entry in Who's Who in the Navy. Aside from his love of discipline, he also continued his obsession with physical and spiritual fitness, spending several hours each day performing strenuous exercises on deck, rain or shine, attending daily church services and lecturing his crew on Christian virtue. Although largely regarded with bemused admiration by his superiors and respectful fear by his subordinates, his extreme nature caused some to consider him a fanatic; Andrew Gordon describes him as "in a colloquial if not a clinical sense, insane."

He was severely wounded in November 1901, when a 6-inch gun, which was being prepared to celebrate the King's birthday, exploded on board the Royal Sovereign, killing six men. Following recovery, he was promoted to captain on 26 June 1902, and later that year ordered to the President for RN College

Robert Arbuthnot in motoring attire, as depicted in the Illustrated London News, 10 June 1916 after his death

In January 1910, while commanding officer of the battleship HMS Lord Nelson, Arbuthnot made a speech at the Auto-Cycle Union, which was at the time considered very inflammatory, especially considering that British flag officers were under standing orders to avoid political intrigues. He spoke boldly of the German menace and insisted that urgent preparations against it were essential. He said that ever since the German Emperor came to the throne, he had been preparing for the invasion of the country. A General election was in progress and he urged that "to prevent that, the first thing to do was to keep the Liberals out of power". Arbuthnot's remarks caused consternation within the Royal Navy and a minor diplomatic incident with Germany; the German government made a formal protest and the Admiralty demanded an explanation from Arbuthnot, during which he refused to recant his remarks or apologize. He was quickly relieved of his command and placed on half pay. However, shortly thereafter he was appointed to the submarine committee (March to December), and then appointed commodore commanding the First Destroyer Flotilla at Harwich, where he remained 1910–1912. He was also aide-de-camp to King George V from 1911 to 1912, and was promoted to rear admiral in July 1912. In 1913 he was appointed second-in-command of the Second Battle Squadron commanded by Vice Admiral Sir George Warrender, flying his own flag from the dreadnought Orion.

=== Outbreak of war ===
Following the outbreak of war in 1914, Arbuthnot's slavishly doctrinaire nature proved harmful to his command abilities, particularly during the German raid on Scarborough when he allowed a group of German light cruisers and destroyers to escape without resistance because he had not yet received official orders from Warrender to open fire. Orion's captain, Frederic Charles Dreyer, had his 13.5-inch guns trained on the enemy ships and later claimed that he repeatedly requested permission to fire, but despite the battle having already been joined for several hours, Arbuthnot refused to allow Dreyer to fire before receiving Warrender's explicit order (via flag hoist) to do so. By the time Warrender (attending to other aspects of the battle in HMS King George V) realized the cause of Arbuthnot's reticence and had the order hoisted, the ships had already turned away and escaped.

Arms of the Arbuthnot baronets of Edinburgh

Arbuthnot was appointed commander of the 1st Cruiser Squadron in January 1915, with the obsolete armoured cruiser HMS Defence as his flagship. Admiral John Jellicoe, commanding the Grand Fleet, noted that all was not entirely well with the squadron under Arbuthnot: "Arbuthnot is one of the finest fellows in the world, but somehow can't run a squadron. His ideals are too high and he can't leave people alone." Still, Jellicoe believed, "He would be invaluable when there is fighting. I have the highest opinion of him."

=== Performance at the Battle of Jutland ===
Defence with the admiral on board was sunk at the Battle of Jutland on 31 May 1916, in circumstances described by Admiral of the Fleet Lord Fisher as "a glorious but not a justifiable death". Rear Admiral Horace Hood commanding the 3rd Battlecruiser Squadron had briefly engaged light cruisers of the German 2nd Scouting Group, damaging several as they steamed away from the High Seas Fleet at high speed during the initial "Run to the North" stage of the battle. Arbuthnot had seen the engagement and impetuously decided to engage the German cruisers at close range before they could escape; he promptly turned his squadron in pursuit, cutting directly across the path of the 1st Battlecruiser Squadron commanded by David Beatty. In the course of this turn, first Defence and then HMS Warrior steamed directly in front of HMS Lion, forcing it to turn sharply, missing collision with it by less than 200 yards. The British battlecruisers were at that time exchanging shells with their German counterparts as they ran north, drawing the Germans towards the main body of the Grand Fleet: Arbuthnot had turned into an area full of falling shells which other ships had been striving to avoid and was blocking Lion's return fire. The third cruiser of his squadron, HMS Duke of Edinburgh, was unable to cross the battlecruiser line, so stayed behind, while the final cruiser, HMS Black Prince, was also too far away to join the mad dash.

Arbuthnot's goal was apparently aggressively to close at high speed with the drifting, crippled German light cruiser Wiesbaden in order to finish her off. In the process, however, his obsolete and poorly armoured ships obstructed any covering fire from Beatty's better-armoured battlecruisers and presented themselves as an easy target for the combined firepower of German Admiral Franz von Hipper's modern battlecruiser squadron. A lieutenant watching aghast from HMS Malaya later noted: "When I first saw them, I [knew] they were doomed." Within minutes, Defence was destroyed with all 903 hands in a massive magazine explosion after taking fire from SMS Lützow at close range. Captain Gunther Paschen of Lützow recorded, "From left to right there appears in the field of the periscope a ship, improbably large and close. At the first glance I recognise an old English armoured cruiser and give the necessary orders...Range 76 hm....Five salvoes rapidly follow, of which three straddle: then there was repeated the now familiar sight of a ship blowing up." Captain Georg von Hase of the battlecruiser Derfflinger also spotted Defence, but did not even have time to train his guns before she was blown up by Lützow.

Warrior fought on, but was soon crippled by fifteen shell hits. She was unintentionally saved from impending destruction by the super-dreadnought HMS Warspite, which was forced to turn in circles around Warrior because of a stuck rudder, drawing the enemy fire to herself in the process. While Warspite's heavy armour allowed her to withstand the pounding and return to port under her own power, Warrior used the opportunity to withdraw, limped away with mortal damage, and was allowed to founder while under tow the next day. Black Prince was blown up with the loss of all hands that night after blundering into the main German battle line in the dark, leaving Duke of Edinburgh as the sole vessel in 1st Cruiser Squadron to survive Jutland.

Arbuthnot's unwise 'berserk rush' towards the enemy was likely a result of his impetuous and overzealous nature; Steel & Hart likened Arbuthnot to "a bulldog with its teeth firmly into its prey...as if only he and they existed. No thought of his smoke obfuscating the view of the all-important battlecruisers and dreadnoughts. No thought of what might lie ahead cloaked in the poor visibility. No thought, really, at all, at least as far as can now be judged." Marder speculates that Arbuthnot's rush may have also partially stemmed from his quasi-religious zeal in obeying Grand Fleet standing orders, which did, in fact, call for cruisers to rapidly seek out and report on the position of the enemy main battle fleet, which was not immediately in view. Walter Cowan, captain of the battlecruiser HMS Princess Royal saw the cruisers approaching the German fleet and commented he would "bet anything" it was Arbuthnot. One beneficiary of the fiasco was the destroyer HMS Onslow, which was engaged in a torpedo attack on the German fleet at this time. The more interesting targets Defence, Warrior and then Warspite drew fire away from her, allowing her to escape. Her commander, John Tovey, went on to play a part in the sinking of the German battleship Bismarck in the Second World War.

A memorial plaque was erected to Arbuthnot in St. Giles' Cathedral, Edinburgh, and he was posthumously appointed a Knight Commander of the Order of the Bath, having been made a Companion already in 1916.

== Notes ==
Baronetage of the United Kingdom
Preceded by William Wedderburn Arbuthnot	Baronet (of Edinburgh); 1889–1916	Succeeded by Dalrymple Arbuthnot
