= Alexander Henderson of Press =

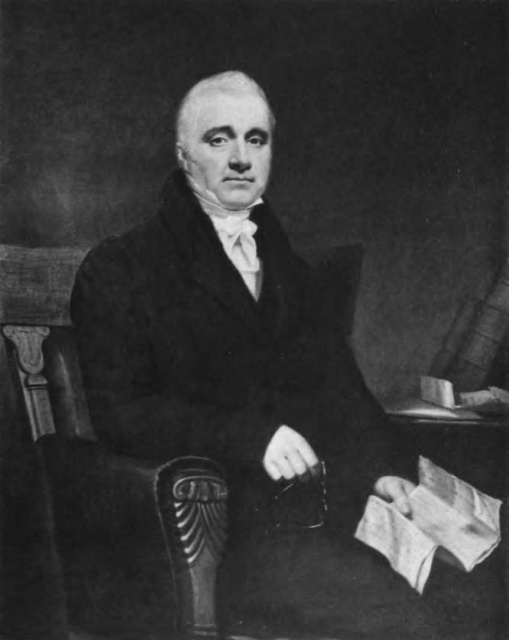
Alexander Henderson, Lord Provost of Edinburgh

Alexander Henderson of Press (c.1770–1826) was an 18th–19th century Scottish nurseryman and seed merchant, who was first Chairman of the National Bank of Scotland and Lord Provost of Edinburgh from 1823 to 1825.

== Life ==
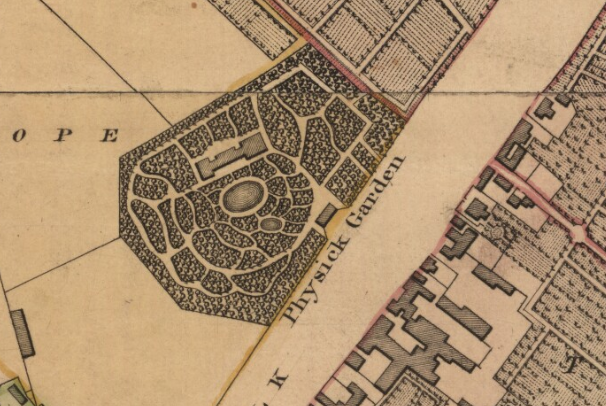
The house in the Physic garden on Leith Walk - detail of John Ainslie's map 1804

He was from an affluent family who owned Press Castle a 650-acre estate near Coldingham.

He ran a seed shop, Eagle & Henderson, at the head of Todricks Wynd on the Royal Mile from at least 1800, but did not live in Edinburgh at that time.

Around 1820 the shop moved to 99 High Street on the Royal Mile in Edinburgh's Old Town. He lived in a large house on Leith Walk at the Old Physic Garden, having bought it when the gardens moved to Inverleith in 1820. This is where he then raised his plants and seeds.

In 1823 he replaced William Arbuthnot as Lord Provost of Edinburgh.

In 1825 he co-founded the National Bank of Scotland and they acquired Dumbreck's Hotel on St Andrews Square to build a new bank.

Eagle Henderson of "Eagle & Henderson" does not appear in directories until 1830 and is then presumably his son. It is unclear who the original Eagle was. Curiously Eagle and Henderson remain at 99 High Street and are listed as having three nurseries: Leith Walk (the old Physic Garden); Meadowbank; and Princes Street. The Princes Street nursery appears on John Wood's map of 1831 at the west end of the Nor Loch and appears to be the first beginning of Princes Street Gardens.

Press Castle survives and is now a Listed building.

He died on 3 March 1826 of a severe stomach complaint whilst Master of the Edinburgh Company of Merchants and was replaced by Sir James Spittal, a previous Master.

== Family ==
He married the sister of Sir Thomas Mills who had served under General Wolfe at Quebec.

His sons included Thomas Henderson (d.1840) and the unusually named Eagle Henderson.

His grandson was the landscape photographer, Alexander Henderson (born 1831) to whom an exhibition is devoted until 16 April 2023 (McCord museum, Canada).
