= Geoffrey Arbuthnot =

Royal Navy admiral

Vice-Admiral Sir Geoffrey Arbuthnot KCB DSO
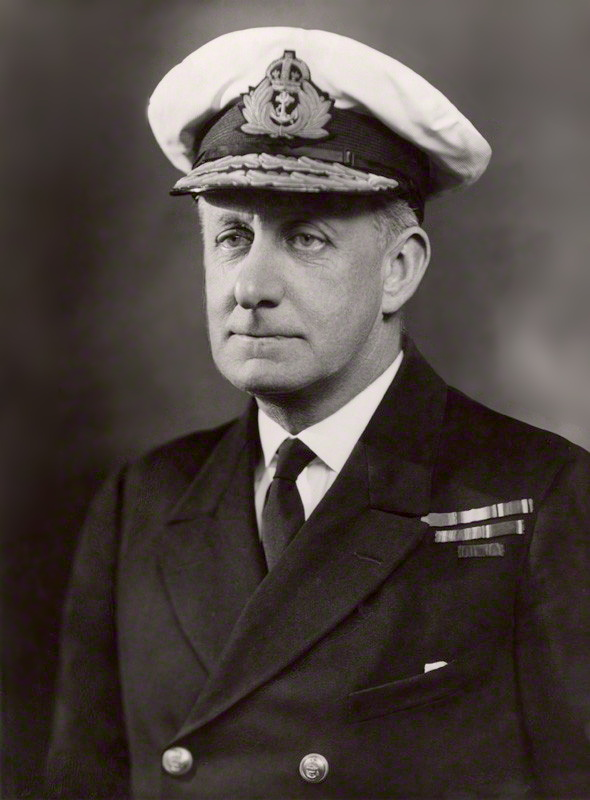
- Born: 18 January 1885; Havant, Hampshire
- Died: 4 October 1957 (aged 72); Heyshott, Sussex
- Military career
- Allegiance: United Kingdom
- Branch: Royal Navy
- Service years: 1900–1946
- Rank: Vice-Admiral
- Commands: East Indies Station (1941–42); HMS Valiant (1935–37); HMS Suffolk (1929–31); HMS Seawolf (1925–26)
- Conflicts: First World War; Second World War
- Awards: Knight Commander of the Order of the Bath; Companion of the Distinguished Service Order; Mentioned in Despatches; Knight of the Legion of Honour (France)

Vice-Admiral Sir Geoffrey Schomberg Arbuthnot, KCB, DSO (18 January 1885 – 4 October 1957) was a senior officer in the Royal Navy.

== Naval career ==
Born in Havant, Hampshire, on 18 January 1885, Arbuthnot was the son of Admiral Charles Ramsay Arbuthnot and Emily Caroline Schomberg. Educated at the Britannia training establishment, Arbuthnot joined the Royal Navy in 1900 and fought in the First World War, where he was mentioned in despatches and was appointed a Companion of the Distinguished Service Order in 1919. He was appointed Naval Member of the Ordnance Committee at Woolwich in 1927 and then given command of the cruiser HMS Suffolk in 1929. He went on to be Deputy Director of Training in 1932, Director of Training and Staff Duties in 1933 and Commander of the destroyer flotillas in the Home Fleet in 1934 before being given command of HMS Valiant in 1935. He was made Naval Aide-de-Camp to King George VI in 1936. In 1937 he became Fourth Sea Lord and Chief of Supplies and Transport. He also served in the Second World War and, having been Commander-in-Chief, East Indies Station from 1941 to 1942, Arbuthnot was made a Knight Commander of the Order of the Bath (1942) and a Knight of the French Legion of Honour. He was Chairman of the Honours and Awards Committee from 1942 to 1945 when he retired.

== Family ==
On 22 October 1913, he married Jessie Marguerite Henderson, second daughter of William Henderson of Berkley House, Frome. They three children; Mary Marguerite (1914–1999), Lieutenant Peter Charles Reginald (1915–1941) and Michael Geoffrey Henderson (1919–1967).

Military offices
Preceded by Sir Percy Noble	Fourth Sea Lord; 1937–1941	Succeeded by Sir John Cunningham
Preceded by Sir Ralph Leatham	Commander-in-Chief, East Indies Station; 1941–1942	Succeeded by Sir Geoffrey Layton
