= Arbuthnot baronets of Edinburgh (1823) =

The Arbuthnot baronetcy of Edinburgh' was created in the Baronetage of the United Kingdom on 3 April 1823 for Sir William Arbuthnot, Provost of Edinburgh.

== Arbuthnot baronets of Edinburgh (1823) ==
- Sir William Arbuthnot, 1st Baronet (1766–1829)
- Sir Robert Keith Arbuthnot, 2nd Baronet (1801–1873) married Anne Fitzgerald, daughter of Field Marshal Sir John Forster FitzGerald, G.C.H., and his wife, Charlotte, child of the Hon. William Hazen. Lady Arbuthnot's Chamber is named after Lady Anne, who died at Florence, Italy, 6 March 1882, her husband having predeceased her on 4 March 1873. The couple had five sons and two daughters.
- Sir William Wedderburn Arbuthnot, 3rd Baronet (1831–1889)
- Rear Admiral Sir Robert Keith Arbuthnot, 4th Baronet (1864–1916), commander of the Royal Navy's 1st Cruiser Squadron; killed in action at the Battle of Jutland on 31 May 1916, knighted KCB posthumously.
- Sir Dalrymple Arbuthnot, CMG, DSO, 5th Baronet (1867–1941), younger brother of 4th baronet
- Major Sir Robert Dalrymple Arbuthnot, 6th Baronet (1919–1944), 24th Lancers, killed in action at Normandy on 30 June 1944
- Sir Hugh Fitzgerald Arbuthnot, 7th Baronet (1922–1983), younger brother of 6th baronet; married Julia Grace, daughter of Major General Frederick Peake
- Sir Keith Robert Charles Arbuthnot, 8th Baronet (born 1951), educated at Wellington College and the University of Edinburgh.

The heir apparent is the present holder's eldest son Robert Hugh Peter Arbuthnot (b. 1986)

=== Coat of arms ===
Coat of arms of Arbuthnot of Edinburgh
| Crest a peacock's head proper. Escutcheon azure, a crescent between three mullets, two and one, argent; the whole within a bordure or, charged with three boars' heads couped gules. Supporters dexter, a wyvern vert vomiting flames; sinister, a greyhound argent, collared and line reflexed over the back gules. Motto "Innocent and true" |

== Gallery ==
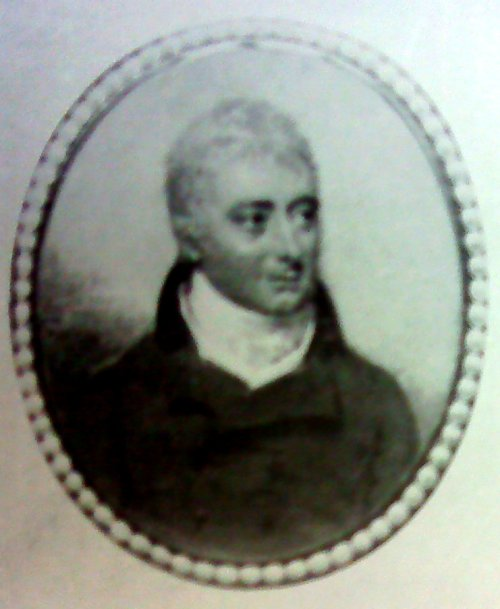
Sir William Arbuthnot, 1st Baronet

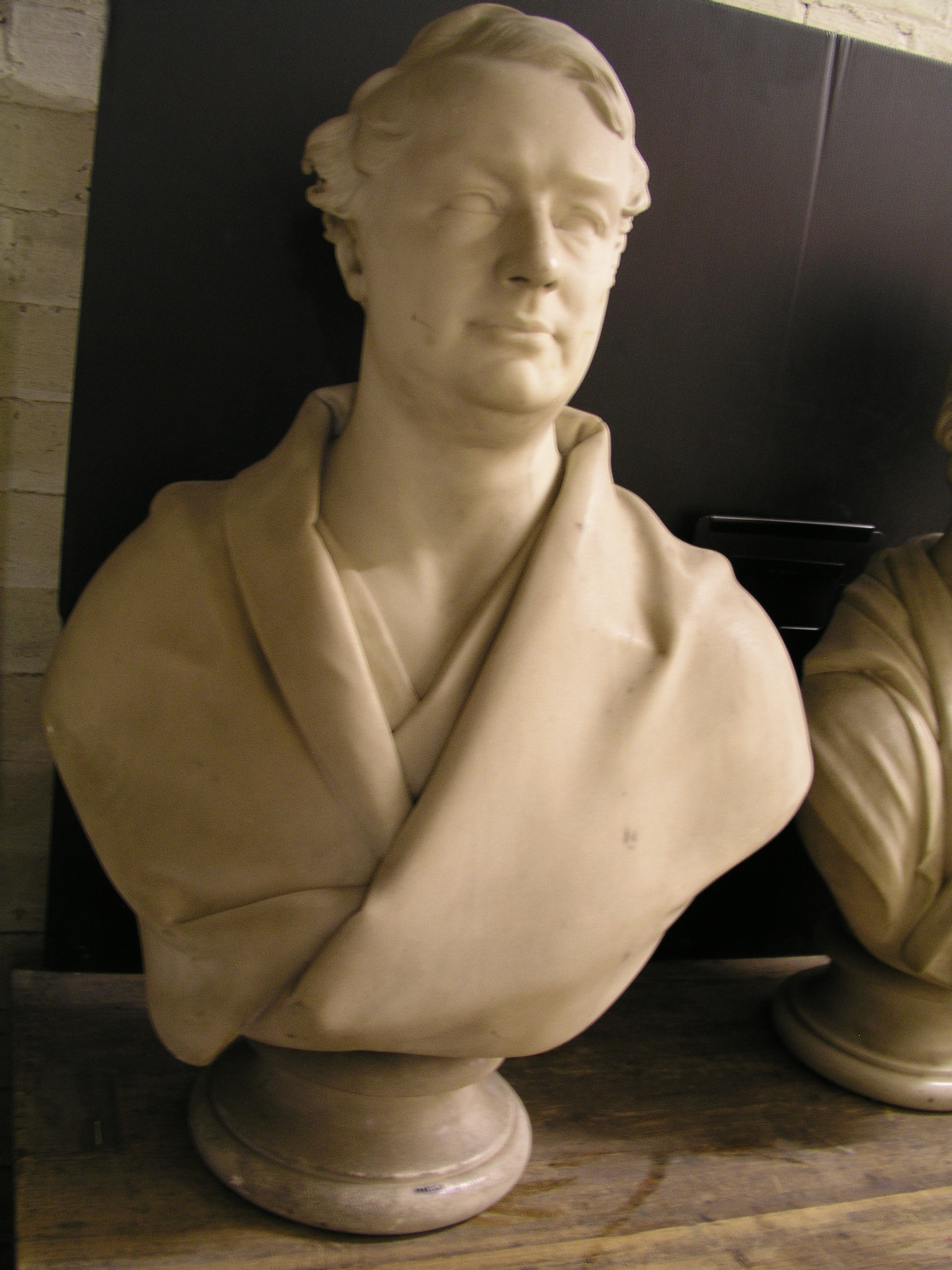
Sir William Arbuthnot, 1st Baronet

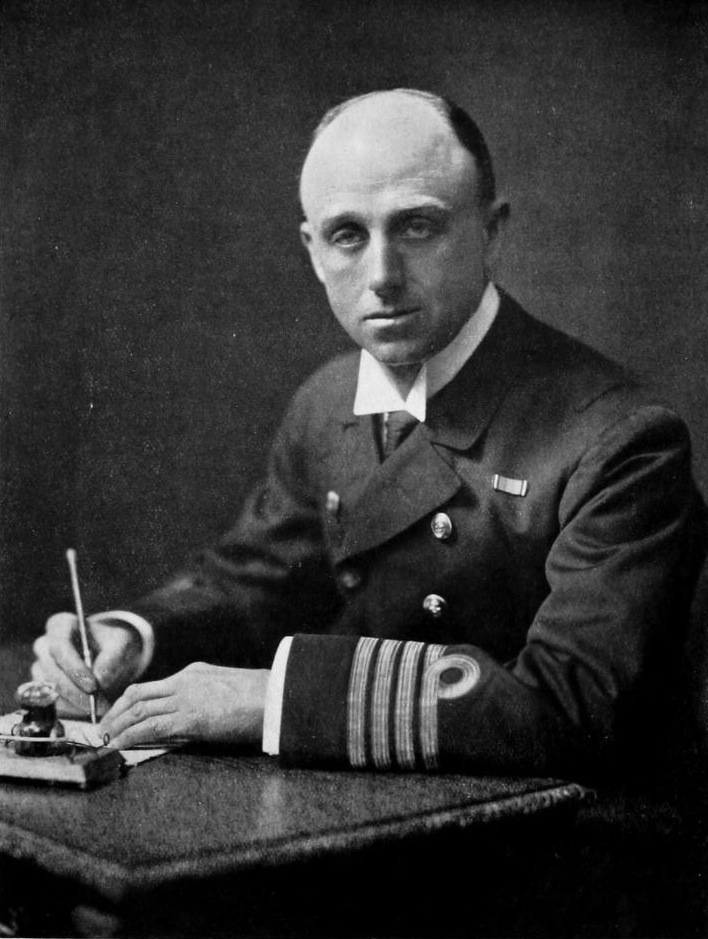
Sir Robert Arbuthnot, 4th Baronet

== Notes ==
Baronetage of the United Kingdom
| Preceded by James baronets | Arbuthnot baronets of Edinburgh; 3 April 1823 | Succeeded by East baronets |
