= Citadel New Military Cemetery =

WWI CWGC cemetery in Somme, France

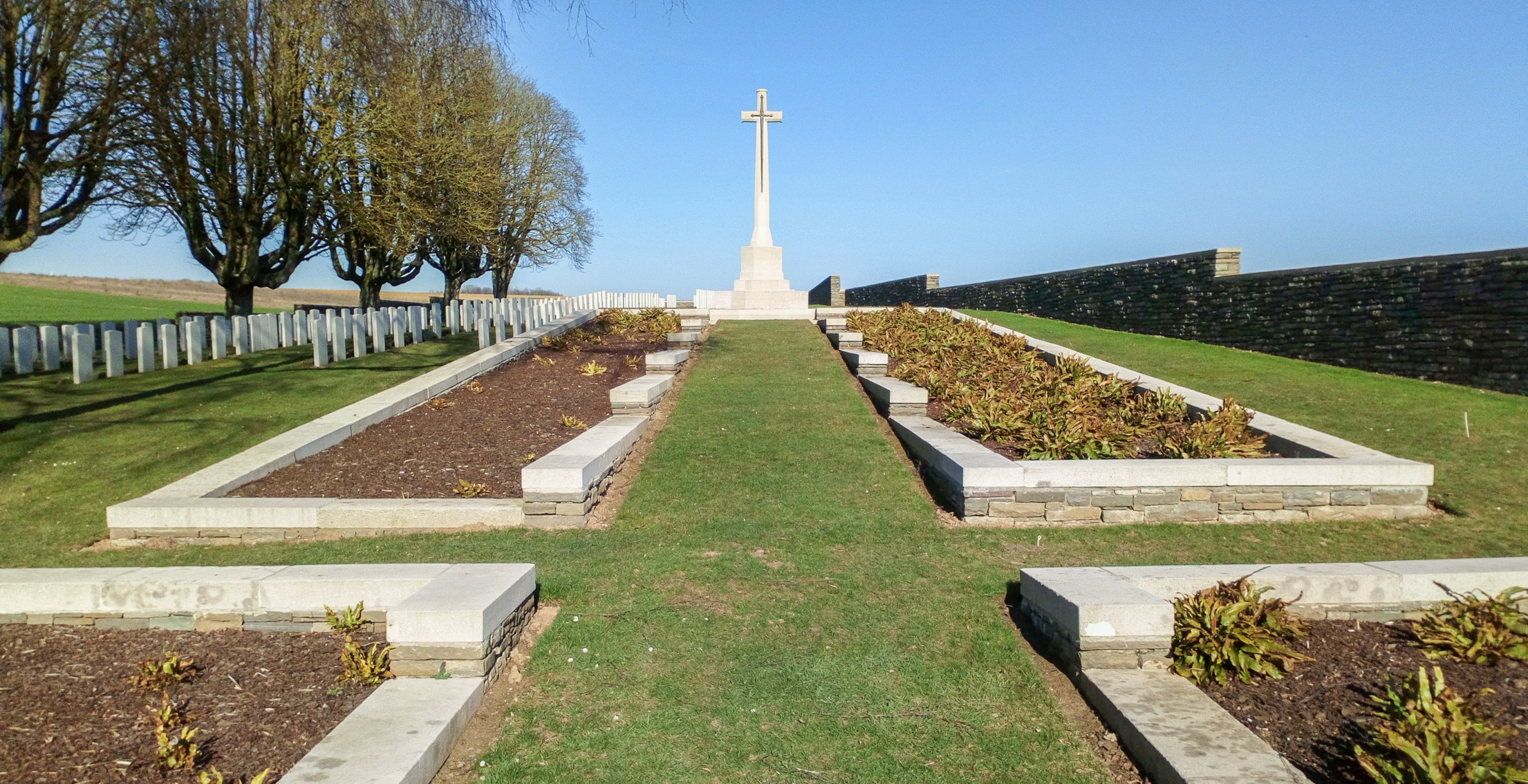

Details
- Established: August 1915
- Location: Fricourt, Somme, France
- Country: British and Commonwealth
- Coordinates: 49°58′36″N 2°43′07″E
- Type: Military
- Owned by: Commonwealth War Graves Commission (CWGC)
- No. of graves: 380 total, 363 identified
- Website: Official website
- Find a Grave: Citadel New Military Cemetery

The Citadel New Military Cemetery is a military cemetery located in the Somme region of France commemorating British and Commonwealth soldiers who fought in World War I. It contains mainly burials made by field ambulances before the Battle of the Somme, although it was also used by some units in the final months of the war. The cemetery is managed by the Commonwealth War Graves Commission.

== Location ==
The cemetery is located near a geographic feature called "the Citadel" in an area known as the "Happy Valley", approximately 2.5 kilometers south of the village of Fricourt on the D147 road. Fricourt is approximately 5 kilometers east of the town of Albert, France.

== Establishment of the Cemetery ==
The cemetery was begun by French troops in August 1915. It was used by various Commonwealth units up until November 1916. Many burials date from the capture of Fricourt by the British 17th (Northern) Division on 2 July 1916. The cemetery was reopened once in August 1918. The cemetery was designed by Sir Edwin Lutyens and Arthur James Scott Hutton.

=== Statistics ===
There are a total of 380 Commonwealth burials in the cemetery, of which 363 are identified and 17 are unidentified. All identified casualties are British.

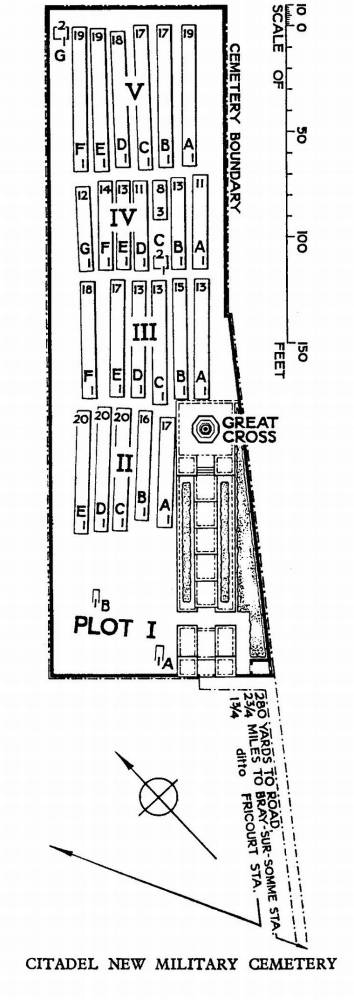
Citadel New Military Cemetery Plan

Number of Burials by Unit
Unit	#	Unit	#
Manchester Regiment	52	Border Regiment	39
Royal Warwickshire	33	Lancashire Fusiliers	25
Royal Engineers	22	Royal Welch Fusiliers	19
Queen's – Royal West Surrey Regiment	17	Royal Field Artillery	16
Gordon Highlanders	15	Cheshire Regiment	13
South Staffordshire Regiment	13	Devonshire Regiment	12
Norfolk Regiment	11	Royal Berkshire Regiment	11
Bedfordshire Regiment	9	Argyll & Sutherland Highlanders	6
Duke of Welling's – West Riding Regiment	5	Grenadier Guards	5
Royal Irish Regiment	5	Royal Fusiliers – City of London Regiment	4
Essex Regiment	3	Machine Gun Corps – Infantry	3
Welsh Guards	3	East Yorkshire Regiment	2
Green Howards – Yorkshire Regiment	2	Irish Guards	2
Middlesex Regiment	2	Royal Army Medical Corps	2
9th Bn. London Regiment – Queen Victoria's Rifles	1	Black Watch – Royal Highlanders	1
Coldstream Guards	1	Dorsetshire Regiment	1
Duke of Cornwall's Light Infantry	1	King's Liverpool Regiment	1
North Staffordshire Regiment	1	Royal Artillery	1
Royal Garrison Artillery	1	Royal Horse Artillery	1
Royal Sussex Regiment	1	Suffolk Regiment	1
