= Arbuthnot Latham =

Private and merchant bank in London, England

Arbuthnot Latham & Co., Limited
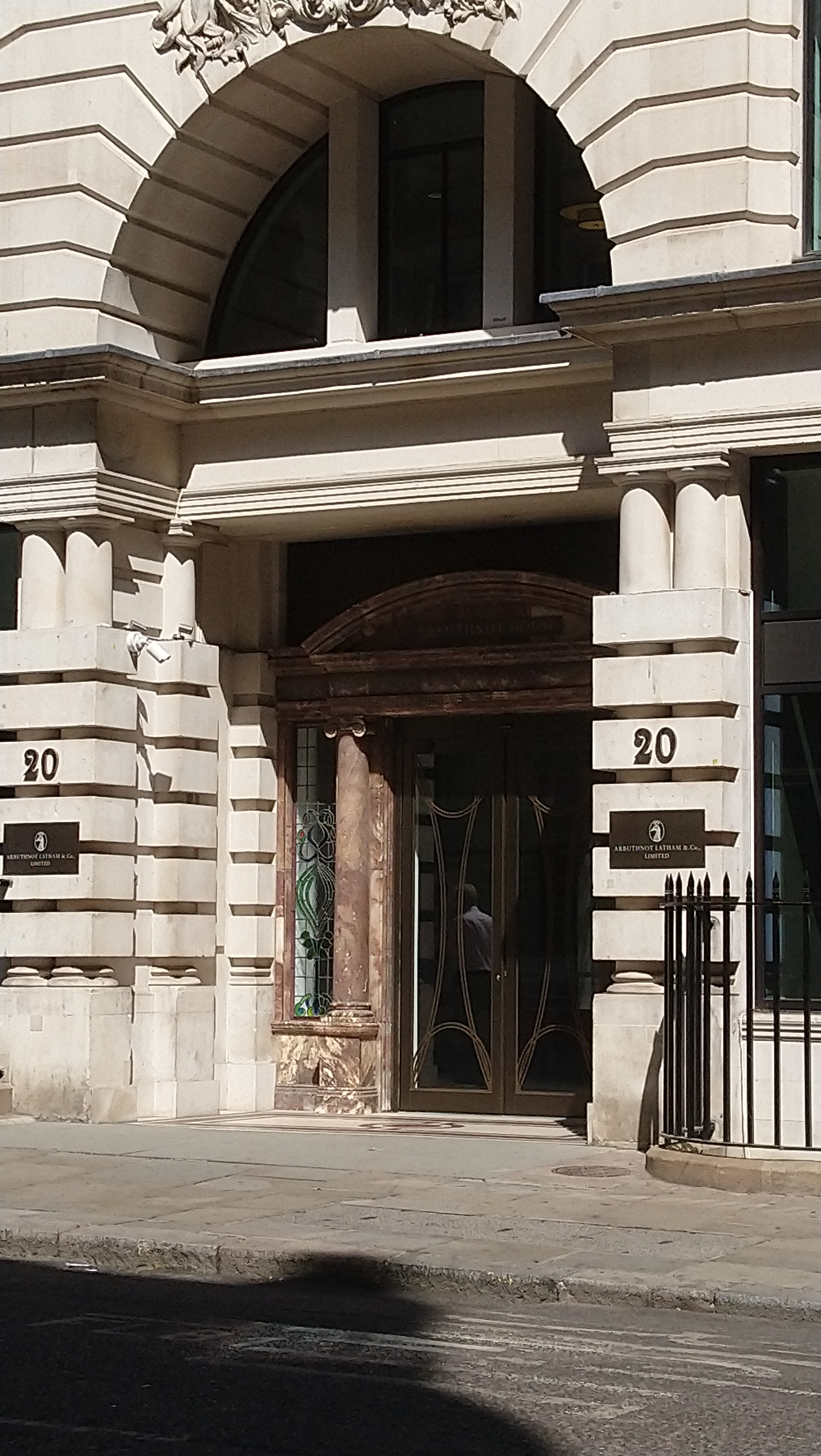
- Trade name: Arbuthnot Latham
- Formerly: Hume Corporation Limited (1964–1982); Aitken Hume Limited (1982–1989); Aitken Hume Bank Public Limited Company (1989–1994)
- Type: Limited company
- Traded as: AIM: ARBB; FTSE AIM UK 50 Index constituent
- Industry: Financial services
- Founded: 13 May 1833 (re-founded August 1994)
- Headquarters: 20 Finsbury Circus, London, United Kingdom
- Key people: Sir Nigel Boardman (Chairman); Sir Henry Angest (President); Andrew Salmon (CEO)
- Products: Private banking; Commercial banking; Wealth management; Investment management
- Revenue: ▲£120 million (2022)
- Operating income: ▲£137.4 million (2022)
- Net income: ▲£16.5 million (2022)
- Parent: Arbuthnot Banking Group plc
- Subsidiaries: Renaissance Asset Finance; Arbuthnot Commercial Asset Based Lending; Asset Alliance Group
- Website: arbuthnotlatham.co.uk

Arbuthnot Latham & Co., Limited is a British private and merchant bank headquartered in London, England. It is the principal subsidiary of Arbuthnot Banking Group plc, which is traded on the Alternative Investment Market. Founded in 1833, it has the status of one of the 12 accepting houses.

== History ==
Arbuthnot Latham was founded on 13 May 1833 by Alfred Latham and John A. Arbuthnot at 33 Great St Helen's, Lime Street in the City of London. Originally starting as a general merchant business, it soon began involving itself in finance and lending operations.

In 1981 the Arbuthnot family's involvement with the bank ended, with its purchase by Dow Scandia; a consortium majority owned by the Dow Chemical Company. It was at this time that Henry Angest joined the bank. Shortly afterwards, Dow sold Arbuthnot Latham on to new investors.

By 1990, the business had had four separate owners and the Arbuthnot Latham name had been retired. After successfully leading the management buyout of Secure Homes (later renamed Secure Trust), Henry Angest acquired Arbuthnot Fund Managers (and thereby the Arbuthnot Latham name) in 1991, and then in 1994 acquired Aitken Hume Bank for an estimated £3.2million. In August 1994, Aitken Hume Bank was renamed Arbuthnot Latham & Co.

== Operations ==
Arbuthnot Latham focuses on three primary businesses practices: Private Banking, Commercial Banking, and Wealth Management; both to high net worth private individuals and commercial clients.

=== Private banking ===
Arbuthnot's Private Banking business is structured as follows:

- Executives & Entrepreneurs
- Sports, Media & Entertainment
- Specialist
- Treasury

According to the bank's published eligibility criteria, new private banking clients are required to bring at least £750,000 in deposits, investments or borrowing.

Arbuthnot Latham Manchester, which has a large private banking client book, grew its balance sheet from £20m in 2016 to over £300m in 2021.

=== Commercial banking ===
Arbuthnot's Commercial Banking business is structured as follows:

- Lending Solutions
- Buy to Let
- Real Estate Finance
- Media
- Specialists
- Asset Based Lending
- Arbuthnot Specialist Finance
- Renaissance Asset Finance

In 2019, Arbuthnot Latham was the winner of City A.M.'s Bank of the Year award (originally known as the Retail Bank of the Year award), beating Monzo, OakNorth, Barclays, and Credit Suisse.

=== Wealth management ===
Arbuthnot's Wealth Management business is structured as follows:

- Investment Management
- Wealth Planning
- Retirement Planning

In November 2020, Arbuthnot's Investment arm one WealthBriefing MENA Awards for Excellence "Best Private Bank – Discretionary Fund Management (DFM) Offering" award.

== Locations ==
For the entirety of its existence, Arbuthnot Latham (including its predecessor companies) have been headquartered in the City of London. From 2004 to 2014, Arbuthnot was based in Ropemaker Street, one of the former ‘rope walks’ that existed on the outskirts of medieval London, and very close to the skyscraper Citypoint. In 2014, Arbuthnot Latham acquired the freehold of a property in Wilson Street, also in the Moorgate area as Ropemaker Street, and moved its headquarters there. Since 2024 the company has been based at a refurbished building by Finsbury Circus, now named Arbuthnot House.

Outside of its Central London footprint, Arbuthnot Latham currently has offices in Manchester, Exeter, Bristol and Gatwick Airport. Until 2021, Arbuthnot had an international office based in the International Financial Centre in Dubai. The closure of this office was partially attributed to the collapse in Arbuthnot's earnings as a result of the COVID-19 pandemic.

== Arbuthnot Banking Group ==
The bank is the principal and wholly owned subsidiary of Arbuthnot Banking Group plc (previously known as Secure Trust Banking Group), which is quoted on the Alternative Investment Market (AIM) under the stock symbol ARBB; it was previously listed on the London Stock Exchange main market.

== See also ==
- List of banks in the United Kingdom
