= Arbuthnot & Co =

Bank in British India

Arbuthnot & Co was a mercantile bank, based in Madras, India. It had been founded as Francis Latour & Co in the late 18th century and then became Arbuthnot De Monte & Co. It failed spectacularly on 22 October 1906.

In the last quarter of 1906, Madras (now Chennai) was hit by the worst financial crisis the city ever suffered. Of the three best-known British commercial names in 19th century Madras, one crashed. A distress sale resurrected a second. Lastly, a benefactor bailed out the third. The agency house that failed completely was Arbuthnot's, which was considered the soundest of the three. Parry's (now EID Parry), may have been the earliest of them and Binny and Co.'s founders may have had the oldest associations with Madras, but it was Arbuthnot & Co., established in 1810, that was the city's strongest commercial organization in the 19th Century. When it failed, thousands lost their savings and the good name of British banking was severely rocked.

Arbuthnot & Co had two partners at the time of its failure: Sir George Gough Arbuthnot and J.M. Young, a salaried partner who seems to have had no voice in the running of the firm. Arbuthnot & Co had entered into an arrangement with Patrick Macfadyen who operated P Macfadyen & Co., which was effectively Arbuthnot's London branch. Macfadyen engaged in speculation, in the process losing huge amounts of the firm's money. Prior to its collapse, Arbuthnot & Co. had employed between 11,000 and 12,000 people. At the time of its collapse it had 7,000 creditors and £1,000,000 in liabilities. Macfadyen had 1,000 creditors and £400,000 in liabilities. The English trustee in bankruptcy and the official assignee in Madras agreed to combine the assets of P Macfadyen & Co. in London and Arbuthnot & Co. in Madras. The 8,000 creditors of either firm would also pool their £1,4000,000 in claims and would then be entitled to share pro rata in the pooled assets.

Both Macfadyen and Arbuthnot had been over-optimistic concerning their speculations and both firms had to close their doors. Macfadyen committed suicide by throwing himself under a train in 1906. Arbuthnot was tried for the fraudulent activities the collapse revealed, and received a sentence of "18 months rigorous imprisonment".

A key figure in case was V. Krishnaswamy Iyer, a Madras lawyer who went on to organize a group of Chettiars that founded Indian Bank in 1907.

== See also ==
- History of Chennai
- Indian banking

== Citations and references ==
Citations

References

- R. Srinivasan (2005). The Fall of Arbuthnot & Co. East West Books (Madras). ISBN 81-88661-40-6.
- The crash of Arbuthnot & Co
