= Kincaid Mackenzie =

Scottish merchant (1768 - 1830)

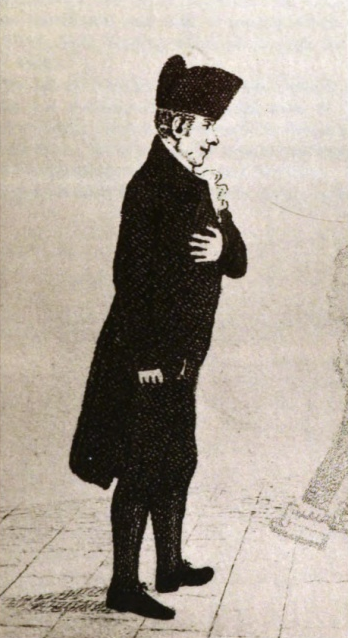
Kincaid Mackenzie

Alexander Kincaid Mackenzie (1768–1830) was a 19th-century Scottish merchant who served as Lord Provost of Edinburgh from 1817 to 1819.

== Life ==
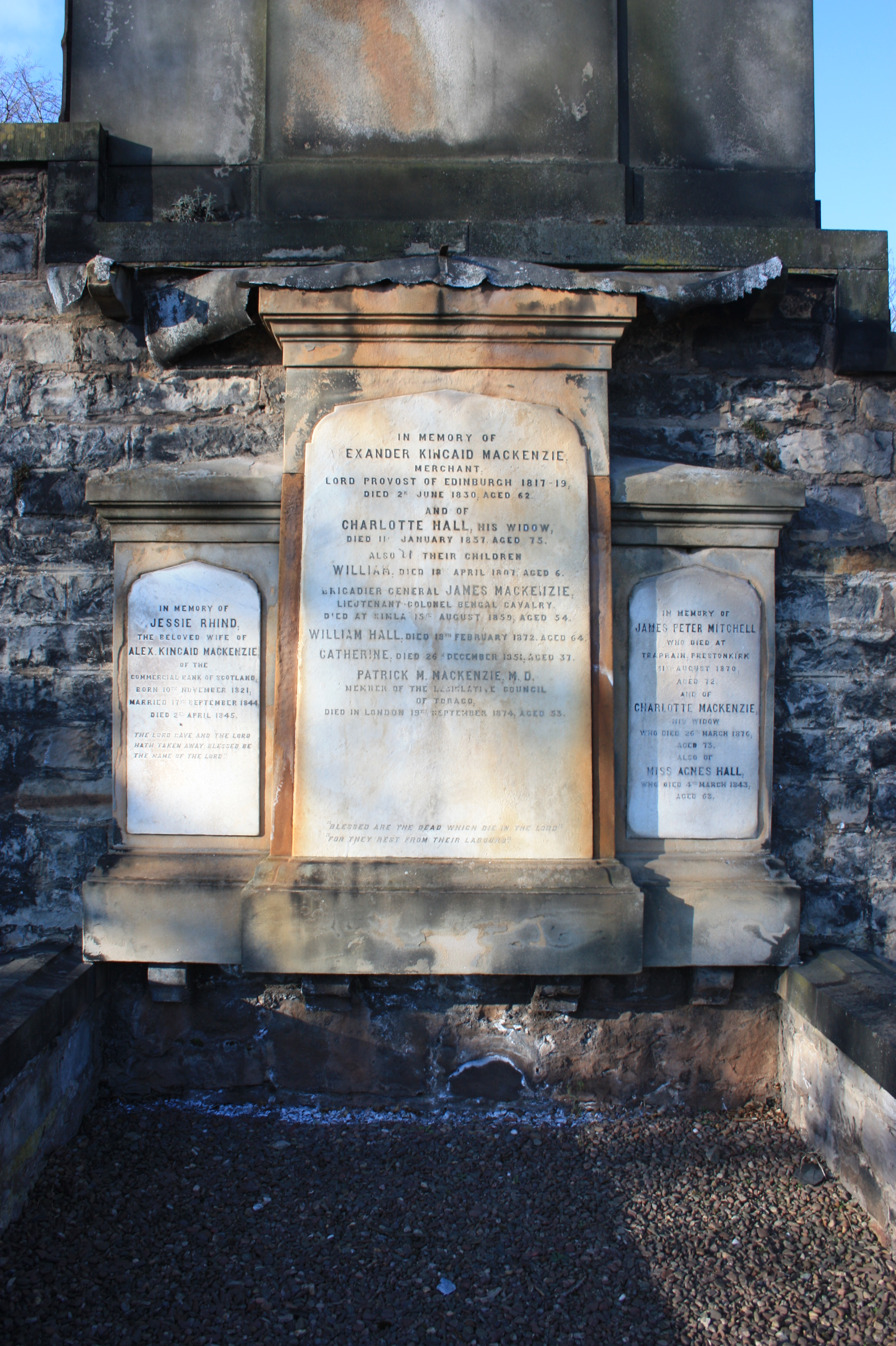
The grave of Alexander Kincaid Mackenzie, New Calton Burial Ground

He was born in Edinburgh in 1768. His father held a post in the printworks of Alexander Kincaid, Lord Provost of Edinburgh in 1776, and Kincaid was named in his honour.

It is thought his father died young as his mother "Mrs Mackenzie" is noted as a merchant trading from the Luckenbooths, next to St Giles Cathedral in 1773.

By 1800 he was trading as a wine merchant in his own right, from the "head of James Court" on the Lawnmarket. He later became a partner in William Hall & Co, wine merchants on the Lawnmarket in Edinburgh.

In 1806 he was living at Buchanan Court in Edinburgh's Old Town. He moved to a new house on Gayfield Square as soon as it was built (c.1808).

He joined the Town Council and in 1810 a public (but anonymous) letter was sent to "Bailie Kincaid Mackenzie" accusing the Edinburgh Town Council of various financial improprieties. In 1818, during his period as Lord Provost, a similar accusation caused him to publish the council's finances in full.

In 1819, at his house on the west side of Gayfield Square, he hosted a visit from Prince Leopold of Belgium, and this name was then used for the mew buildings under construction nearby, at the junction of Leith Walk and London Road, still known as Leopold Place.

He was noted in 1819 as an ex-President of the Edinburgh Magdalene Asylum for Fallen Women.

He became Treasurer of George Heriot's Hospital in 1822/23 in place of James Denholme at a salary of £500 per annum.

He died during dinner at his home, 5 Gayfield Square at the top of Leith Walk on 2 June 1830 aged 62. He rose suddenly saying that he felt unwell and expired before he reached the diningroom door.

He is buried on the central western terrace of New Calton Burial Ground in Edinburgh, facing south to Arthur's Seat, next to the grave of Sir Robert Christison.

== Family ==
He was married to Catherine Hall (1782–1857) youngest daughter of his business partner William Hall. Their children included:

- Alexander Kincaid Mackenzie (c.1800-?), eldest son, married Jessie Rhind (1821–1845) sister of Alexander Henry Rhind, antiquary.
- Charlotte Mackenzie (1803–1876) married James Peter Mitchell
- Brigadier General James Mackenzie of the Bengal Cavalry (1804–1859) who died at Simla.
- William Hall Mackenzie (1808–1872)
- Catherine Mackenzie (1814–1851)
- Dr Patrick Mitchell Mackenzie (1821–1874) who spent many years in Tobago
