= Charles Ramsay Arbuthnot =

Royal Navy Admiral (1850–1913)

Admiral Charles Ramsay Arbuthnot FRGS
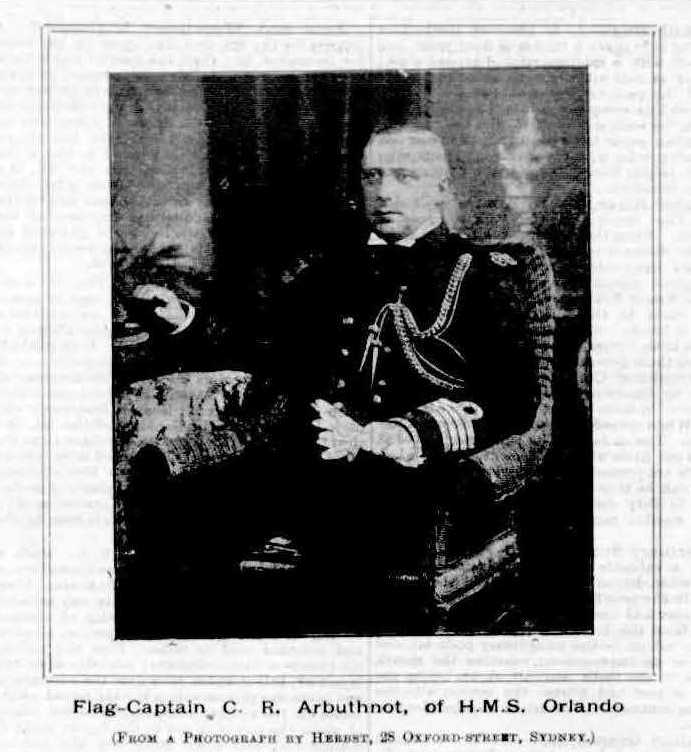
- Arbuthnot as Flag-Captain of Orlando in Australia in 1892
- Born: 5 February 1850; Liverpool, England
- Died: 30 September 1913 (aged 63)
- Relatives: Sir William Arbuthnot, 1st Baronet (grandfather); Vice Admiral Charles Frederick Schomberg (father-in-law); Vice Admiral Sir Geoffrey Arbuthnot (son)
- Military career
- Allegiance: United Kingdom of Great Britain and Ireland
- Branch: Royal Navy
- Service years: 1863–1907
- Rank: Admiral
- Commands: HMS Orlando; HMS Crescent; HMS Hermione; HMS Resolution
- Awards: Arctic Medal

Admiral Charles Ramsay Arbuthnot (5 February 1850 – 30 September 1913) was an officer of the British Royal Navy.

== Biography ==
Arbuthnot was born in Liverpool, England, the son of George Clerk Arbuthnot (1803–1876) of Marisbank, Midlothian, (the third son of Sir William Arbuthnot, 1st Baronet), by his second wife Caroline Ramsay, daughter of James Hay of Collepriest, and Lady Mary Ramsay, the fourth daughter of George Ramsay, 6th Earl of Dalhousie.

Arbuthnot entered the Royal Navy as a cadet in September 1863, aged 13, and was commissioned as a sub-lieutenant in December 1869. He was promoted to the rank of lieutenant from the Royal Yacht Victoria and Albert on 7 September 1871. In 1875–76 he served aboard the yacht Pandora in the Arctic, earning the Arctic Medal.

Arbuthnot was promoted to the rank of commander on 31 December 1883, and to captain on 30 June 1891. In 1888 he was stationed in Zanzibar where he served in the Royal Navy's Anti-Slavery Squadron. He commanded the cruisers Orlando during her operations on the Australia Station between 1892 and 1895, and Crescent from January to March 1895. From January 1896 until April 1898 he was in command of the protected cruiser Hermione, which formed part of the Flying Squadron of 1896, and then the battleship Resolution between April 1898 and March 1900. From August 1900 until August 1903, he was in command of HMS Cambridge, the gunnery ship off Plymouth.

He was appointed a Naval Aide-de-Camp to King Edward VII on 9 September 1901, serving until promoted to the rank of rear-admiral on 1 January 1904.

In accordance with the provisions of the Order in Council of 8 December 1903, Arbuthnot was placed on the Retired List on 1 July 1907. He was promoted to vice-admiral on the Retired List on 22 March 1908, and to admiral on 18 September 1911. He died on 30 September 1913.

== Personal life ==
On 8 January 1880 he married Emily Caroline, second daughter of Rear-Admiral Charles Frederick Schomberg. They had three children; Evelyn Mary (1881–1939), Beatrice Caroline (1883–1953), and Geoffrey Schomberg, (1885–1957).

Arbuthnot was a fellow of the Royal Geographical Society.
