= William Arbuthnot (British Army officer) =

British army general (1838-1893)

Major-General William Arbuthnot CB (27 September 1838 – 12 September 1893) was a British Army officer.

== Early life ==
Arbuthnot was born on 27 September 1838 into the Scottish Clan Arbuthnott. He was the eldest son of Archibald Francis Arbuthnot and the Hon. Gertrude Sophia Gough. His younger siblings included Hugh Gough Arbuthnot (who married Caroline Molyneux), Maj. Archibald Ernest Arbuthnot (who married Anne Elizabeth Ball), Frances Arbuthnot (who married Sir John Kennaway, 3rd Baronet), Robert George Arbuthnot (who married Helen Mary Muir), Anne Gertrude Grace Arbuthnot, and Sir George Gough Arbuthnot (who married a granddaughter of the 8th Earl of Cork).

His paternal grandparents were Sir William Arbuthnot, 1st Baronet and Anne Alves (a daughter of John Alves of Shipland). His maternal grandparents were Hugh Gough, 1st Viscount Gough and Frances Maria Stephens (a daughter of Gen. Edward Stephens).

He was educated at Eton College.

== Career ==
Arbuthnot entered the British Army on 25 March 1856 as an ensign in the Rifle Brigade, going to India to fight the Indian Rebellion of 1857. He transferred into the 14th Hussars, attending Staff college and holding a number of appointments in the 1860s. By 1867, he was serving as aide-de-camp and Assistant Military Secretary to Francis Napier, 10th Lord Napier, commander of the expedition in Abyssinia. While in Abyssinia, he collected five Ethiopian objects, namely "three inscribed horn beakers and a leather-bound Coptic bible and cross" were repatriated to Ethiopia in 2021, in what has been called "the single most significant heritage restitution in Ethiopia's history."

He was promoted to major-general in 1890. He was assistant adjutant-general of the Horse Guards between 1885 and 1892. He was appointed Companion of the Order of the Bath.

== Personal life ==
On 26 April 1865, Arbuthnot married Hon. Alice Charlotte Pitt-Rivers (1841–1865), daughter of George Pitt-Rivers, 4th Baron Rivers of Sudeley Castle and Lady Susan Georgiana Leveson-Gower (daughter of the 1st Earl Granville). Two months after they were wed and during the couple's wedding tour, she was killed by lightning while climbing the Schilthorn.

After her death, he married Selina Moncreiffe (1851–1877), daughter of Sir Thomas Moncreiffe, 7th Baronet, and Lady Louisa Hay-Drummond (eldest daughter of the 11th Earl of Kinnoull), on 20 July 1869. Before her death in November 1877, they were the parents of:

- Gerald Archibald Arbuthnot (1872–1916), an MP for Burnley who married Mary Johanna Antoinette Dulcie Oppenheim, daughter of Charles Augustus Oppenheim and Isabelle Frith, on 6 February 1894.

After her death, he married Edith Anne Pearse (1857–1931), daughter of Maj.-Gen. James Langford Pearse, on 2 December 1879.

Arbuthnot died on 12 September 1893, aged 54, and was buried in Brompton Cemetery. His widow remarried to Guy de Miremont, Count of Miremont on 1 August 1894 before her own death on 21 August 1931.

=== Descendants ===
Through his son Gerald, he was a grandfather of three: Frances Gertrude Arbuthnot (1896–1938), who married Alexander Charles Kenneth Lindsay-Stewart; Cynthia Isabelle Theresa Arbuthnot (b. 1898), who married Ian Fairbairn; and Dorothea Helen Mary Arbuthnot (1901–1942), who married Hubert Hawkes Woodward.
