= George Gough Arbuthnot =

Businessman and civic leader in British India (1878-1929)

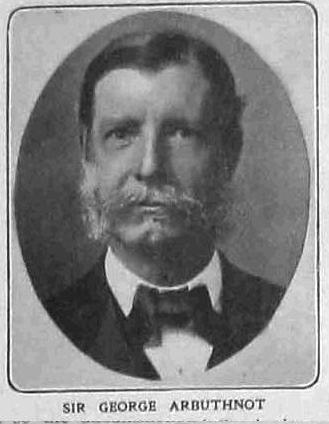
Sir George Arbuthnot

Sir George Gough Arbuthnot (28 August 1848 – 3 May 1929) was a businessman and civic leader in British India.

== Early life ==
Arbuthnot was born on 28 August 1848. He was the youngest son of Archibald Francis Arbuthnot and the Hon. Gertrude Sophia Gough. His elder siblings included Maj.-Gen. William Arbuthnot, Hugh Gough Arbuthnot (who married Caroline Molyneux), Maj. Archibald Ernest Arbuthnot (who married Anne Elizabeth Ball), Frances Arbuthnot (who married Sir John Kennaway, 3rd Baronet), Robert George Arbuthnot (who married Helen Mary Muir), and Anne Gertrude Grace Arbuthnot.

His paternal grandparents were Sir William Arbuthnot, 1st Baronet and Anne Alves (a daughter of John Alves of Shipland). His maternal grandparents were Hugh Gough, 1st Viscount Gough and Frances Maria Stephens (a daughter of Gen. Edward Stephens).

== Career ==
Arbuthnot was six times a member of the Madras Legislative Council. He was seven times made chairman of the Madras Chamber of Commerce, several times President of the board of directors of the Bank of Madras, and in 1900 became chairman of the Famine Relief Fund. Grandson of a Baronet, he was made a Knight Bachelor on 10 December 1901 for services to the British Empire.

He became partner of Arbuthnot & Co of Madras 1871 and was senior partner in the firm at the time of its spectacular crash in 1906, as a result of which he was sentenced to 18 months rigorous imprisonment. The charges against him were (1) Cheating in respect of a fixed deposit in the name of the Rajah Krishna Badahur; (2) breach of trust respecting the Madras Equitable Assurance Society; and (3) breach of trust in misappropriating the funds of Arbuthnot's Industrials.

== Personal life ==
On 9 September 1873, Arbuthnot married Isabella Albinia Boyle (d. 1929), daughter of the Rev. Hon. Richard Cavendish Boyle (the son of the 8th Earl of Cork) and Eleanor Vere Gordon. They had two daughters:

- Eleanor Mary Arbuthnot (1874–1875), who died young.
- Cecilia Albinia Arbuthnot (c. 1881–1956), who married Lt.-Col. Hon. Robert Lygon, son of Frederick Lygon, 6th Earl Beauchamp and Lady Emily Pierrepont (daughter of the 3rd Earl Manvers), in 1903.

Sir George died on 3 May 1929 and his widow, Lady Arbuthnot, died a few months later on 25 August 1929.
