= Robert Arbuthnot (Ceylon) =

British soldier and diplomat

Robert Arbuthnot (c. 1761 – February 1809) was a British soldier turned diplomat who served between 1801 and 1806 as the Chief Secretary of Ceylon (as Sri Lanka was called before 1972), which had recently been transferred from Dutch to British military control, formally in 1796.

A promising career in imperial administration was terminated in February 1809. Arbuthnot was a passenger on HMS Viper when the small schooner was lost at sea between Cádiz and Gibraltar.

== Life ==
Robert Arbuthnot was born in about 1760 or 1761, at the height of the Seven Years' War. His father, also called Robert Arbuthnot (1728–1803), was an Edinburgh polymath and merchant, an earlier career as a banker having ended in "heavy pecuniary losses". Two decades later Arbuthnot had joined the army. It is known that he was present at the Siege of Gibraltar (1779–1782) in which French and Spanish forces, exploiting Great Britain's transatlantic distractions, engaged in a sustained but unsuccessful attempt to displace British forces from "The Rock".

Arbuthnot later found himself transferred to royal service, selected to act as a traveling companion in mainland Europe for the adolescent Prince Augustus Frederick, Duke of Sussex, one of the British king's younger sons and, it appears, the least compliant of them all. Through his life Arbuthnot was a committed letter writer, but his surviving correspondence is discretely uninformative about his time as the prince's escort. A flavour of the challenges involved nevertheless emerges in a letter written to him by George Arbuthnot, his brother many years later. Writing in 1803, George commends his brother: "I have often admired you for your firmness and composure at the time when Prince Augustus ran away from you ...".

War returned in 1792 and would provide a defining backdrop for the rest of Arbuthnot's life. Between 1792 and 1797, and again between 1798 and 1802, a key continental ally for the British in the wars against France was the Austrian Empire. Robert Murray Keith (1730–1795), recently retired from a position as envoy-extraordinary (de facto ambassador) in Vienna, where he had served since 1772, was recalled to head up the British diplomatic mission in Vienna during the build-up to the war. Murray Keith was a family friend, and he invited Robert Arbuthnot to join him as his private secretary.

Following the French take-over in the Netherlands in 1795 there was a concern in Britain that Ceylon, a Dutch colony, might also fall under French control. The result, in 1796, was British military take-over in Ceylon. The British take-over was not universally welcomed by the Dutch colonist or the indigenous people, and a lengthy period of military and political manoeuvrings ensued. In 1798 the British government was ready to send the first British governor to the territory. Frederick North, the younger son of a former British prime minister, was joined in 1801 by Robert Arbuthnot as his Chief Secretary. Robert arrived accompanied by his younger brother, George Arbuthnot (1772–) who was appointed deputy-secretary to the governor. The two brothers were accommodated in the governor's own newly built "Doric Bungalow". George soon moved on, relocating to Madras, but Robert Arbuthnot remained in Ceylon, as Governor North's deputy, till 1806.

During the Dutch period European colonisation had largely been restricted to coastal parts of the island, but the British arrived with sufficient forces to effect, by 1818, a take-over of the entire territory. British moves to take power in Kandy, the interior of Ceylon, began in 1803. The Governor and his Chief Secretary were not present at what was later described as the "massacre of British troops at Kandy", but when news reached them of the military set-back, one source states that Governor North, "whose coolness and presence of mind seem momentarily to have deserted him ... found his chief support and ... placed his utmost reliance in the calm judgment and fearless confidence of his secretary".

== Memberships ==
Arbuthnot was admitted to Edinburgh's "Speculative Society" in January 1778. In January 1788 was elected a member of the Royal Society of Edinburgh.
