= Arbuthnot baronets =

Two baronetcies with the surname Arbuthnot have been created for members of the Arbuthnot family—both in the Baronetage of the United Kingdom, and still extant.

- Arbuthnot baronets of Edinburgh (1823)
- Arbuthnot baronets of Kittybrewster (1964)
