= List of extant paddle steamers =

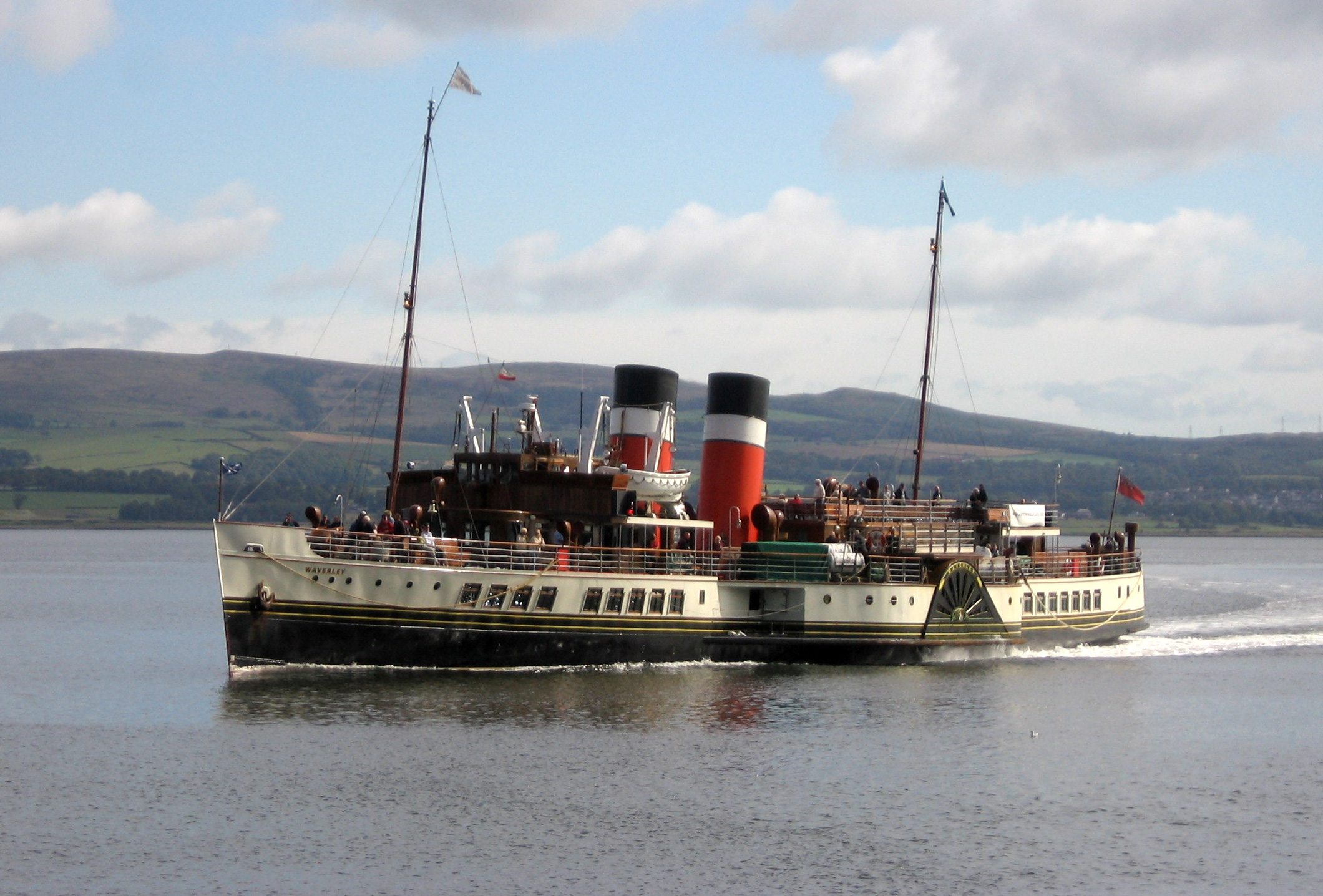
PS Waverley departing on a cruise from Greenock in Scotland.

This is a list of extant paddle steamers, including those in active service as well as museum ships and surviving paddle steamers that have been proposed at some stage and are still possible candidates for restoration. It does not include submerged paddle steamer wreck sites.

While a paddle steamer technically means a paddle-propelled boat or ship powered by a steam engine, this list also currently includes paddle boats that began as paddle steamers but whose powerplant was later changed to a different type of engine, as well as paddle boats that have never had a steam engine as a powerplant but which emulate the style and appeal of historic paddle steamers.

== Australia ==
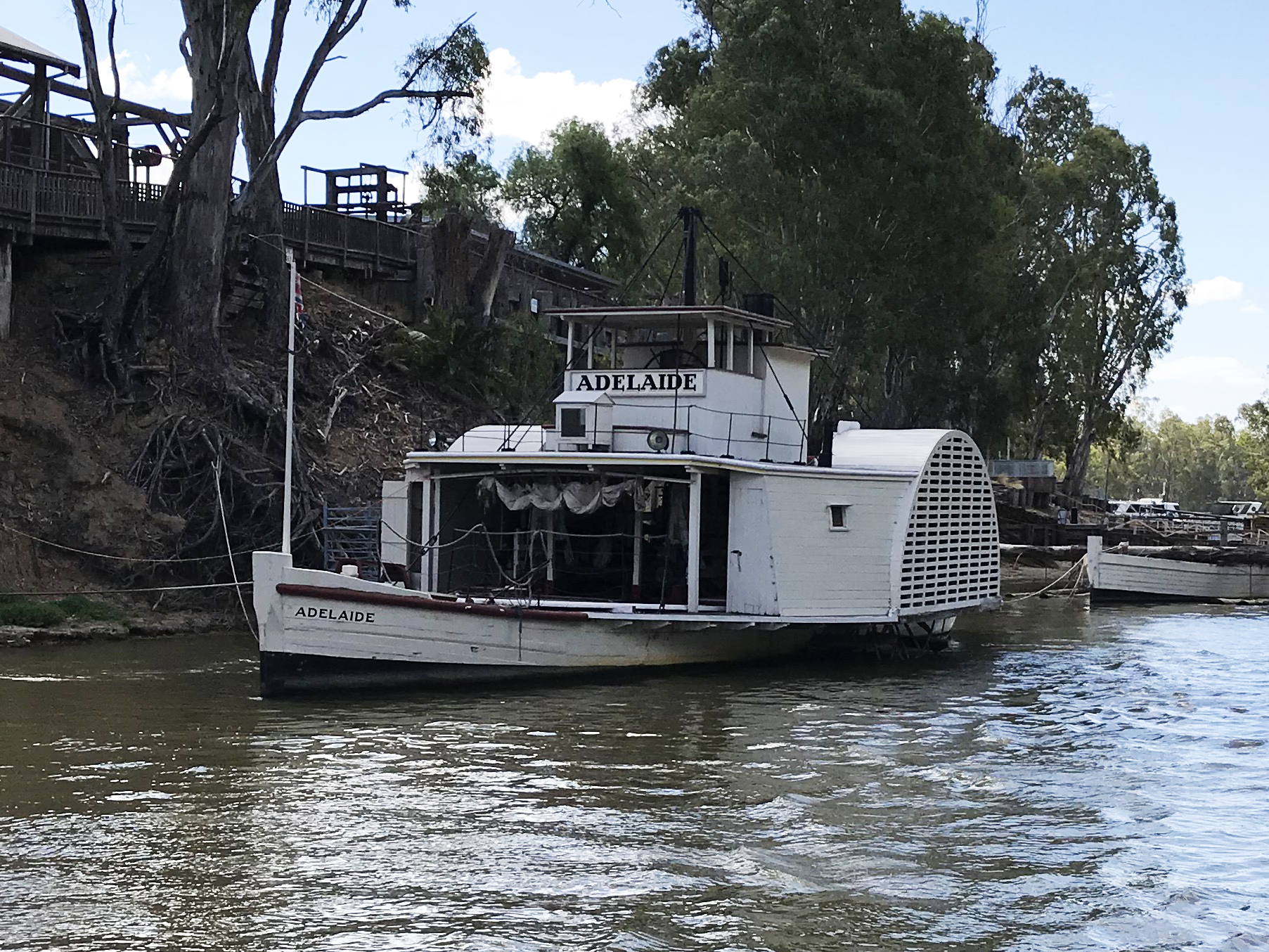
PS Adelaide at Echuca on the Murray River.

Australia has a large collection of authentic and replica paddle steamers and paddle boats operating along the Murray and Darling Rivers and in other areas around the country, as well as several examples that are inactive or preserved as museum ships. Echuca/Moama has the largest fleet of paddle steamers in Australia, with seven operating commercially, and a large number of smaller privately owned vessels.

PS Adelaide is the oldest wooden-hulled paddle steamer in the world. Built in 1866, she operates from the Port of Echuca.

PS Gem, a Murray River paddler built in 1876, that survives as a museum ship at Swan Hill, Victoria's Pioneer Settlement.

PS Pevensey, built in Moama in 1911 and based in Echuca, is still working as a tourist attraction on the Murray River. Pevensey also starred as the fictional paddlesteamer Philadelphia in the TV series All the Rivers Run.

PS Etona is now privately owned, but was built as a church mission boat for the SA Murray: sponsored by the Anglican Archbishop of Adelaide, and funded by old boys of Eton (UK). It had a small chapel. Larger gathering were held on riverbanks and in woolsheds. After retirement, it became a fishing boat, then moved to Echuca to be a private houseboat. It also appeared in 'All the rivers' run, reprising its role as a mission boat.

PS Alexander Arbuthnot, built 1923 at Koondrook, and named after the former owner of the Arbuthnot Sawmills, works today as a tourist boat at the Port of Echuca.

PS Canberra, built 1913 at Goolwa, is currently operating public cruises in Echuca. Canberra was built for the Conner family of Boundary Bend, as their flagship fishing vessel, but has been in the tourism industry since 1944.

PS Emmylou, a replica steamer, was built in 1982 at Barham, and operates a large range of cruises in Echuca – from one-hour sightseeing trips to three-night and four-day fully accommodated voyages. She is powered by an authentic steam engine, dating back to 1906.

PS Melbourne, built 1912, operates sightseeing cruises from Mildura.

PS Murray Princess, the largest of the paddle wheelers operating in Australia [diesel, not steam], is a recent build (1987). Murray Princess measures in around 210 ft (64 m) in length and 45 ft (14 m) in width (the maximum which can fit the standard size of locks 1 to 10), and has a remarkably shallow draft of 3 ft (0.9 m). It has accommodation for 120 passengers and up to 30 crew, and operates three, four and seven-night cruises along the Murray, from Mannum in South Australia. Murray Princess was owned and operated for many years by Captain Cook Cruises in Sydney, but was sold to the SeaLink Travel Group, now the Kelsian Group, based in Adelaide. It was once in a fleet of three vessels.

PS Murray River Queen was built in 1974 and retired from active service in 1993. She was moved from Waikerie in 2017 and is now permanently moored in Renmark.

The replica paddle steamer Curlip was constructed in Gippsland, Australia, and launched in November 2008. As at 2020, it was on the hard at Paynesville, with an uncertain future.

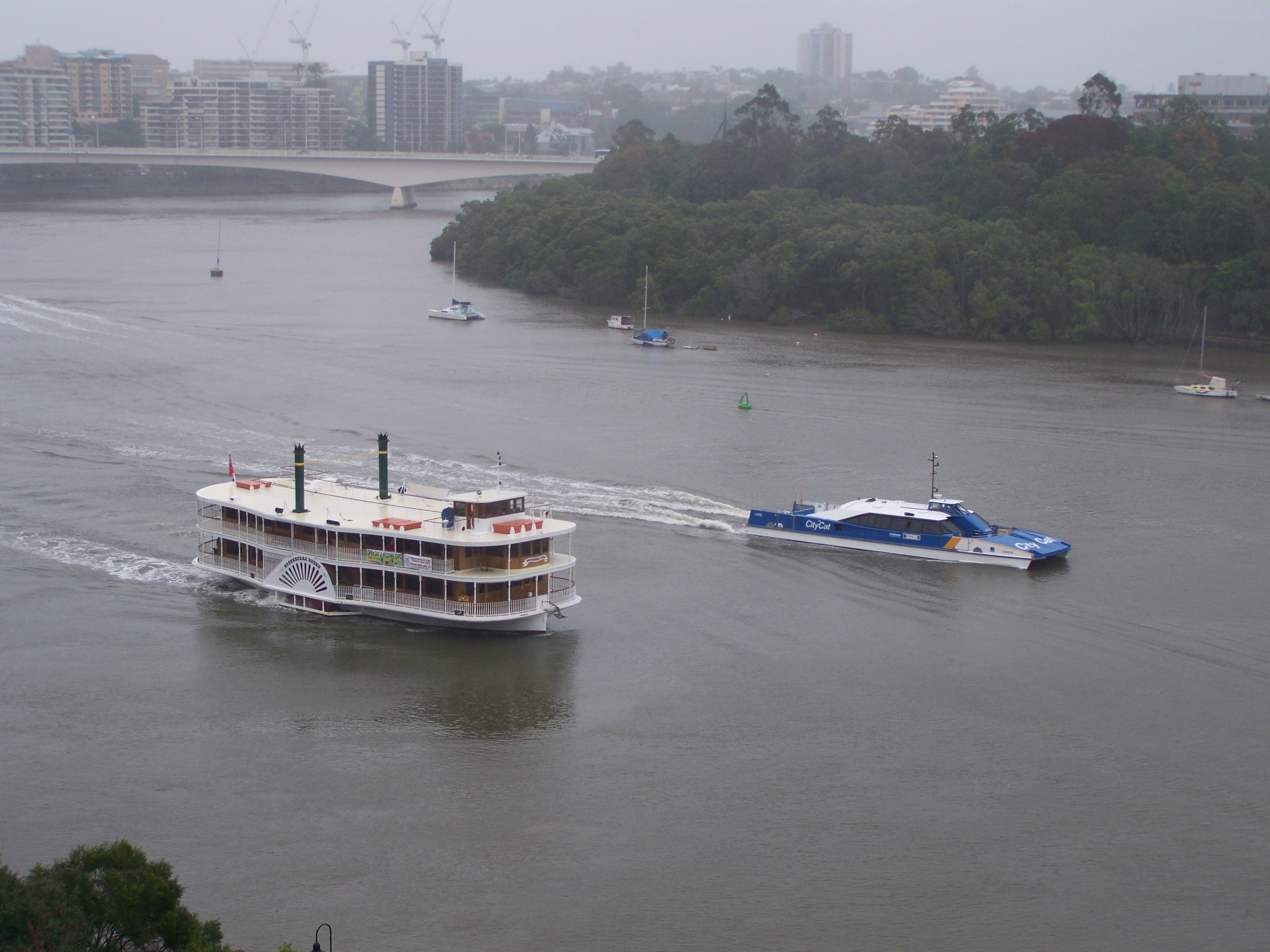
PS Kookaburra Queen and a CityCat

PV Kookaburra Queen [diesel, not steam] operates on the Brisbane River as a floating restaurant or venue for hire, along with SWPV Kookaburra Queen II

PS Enterprise, which was built in Echuca in 1876–78, was used on the Murray River, the Darling River and the Murrumbidgee River in New South Wales. She was acquired by the National Museum of Australia in 1984, restored to full working order, and is now berthed as an exhibit outside the museum at a wharf on the Acton Peninsula, Lake Burley Griffin, Canberra.

PV Pyap runs tourist cruises from the Swan Hill Pioneer Settlement in Swan Hill, Victoria.

PS Industry is based at Renmark.

PS Marion is based at Mannum. It is run by volunteers, and runs short local cruises, and extended overnight ones. PV Mayflower is run by the same people.

PS Ruby is based at Wentworth (NSW).

PS Oscar W is based at Goolwa.

PS Canally is under restoration at Morgan.

PS Cumberoona was built as a bicentennial project by Albury City Council. It suffered from uncertain water levels, and has been transferred to Lake Mulwala (Yarrawonga Weir, on Murray River).

The paddle wheeler Nepean Belle operates cruises on the Nepean River at Penrith, New South Wales.

PV Thomson Belle operates cruises on Thomson River (Longreach, Qld). It was originally PS Ginger Belle on Maroochy River, and retains its steam equipment as a display item.

PS Decoy operates on Swan River (Perth, WA).

Replica PV Golden City is on Lake Wendouree (Ballarat, Vic.). The original was on that lake, then went to Caribbean Gardens (a Melbourne recreational park), then back to Ballarat for restoration. That was nearly complete when the shed and the vessel were destroyed by arson. The group then built a replica.

PV Begonia Princess on Lake Wendouree (Ballarat, Vic.).

Replica PS William IV on Hunter River (Newcastle, NSW). This was built as a bicentennial project (1988), languished on the hard for many years while fundraising took place, but is active again.

PV Julie Fay ran local morning/afternoon-cruises on Murray River for many years, then was sold for private use. It is now a static b&b, moored somewhere near Cobram or Tocumwal.

== Austria ==
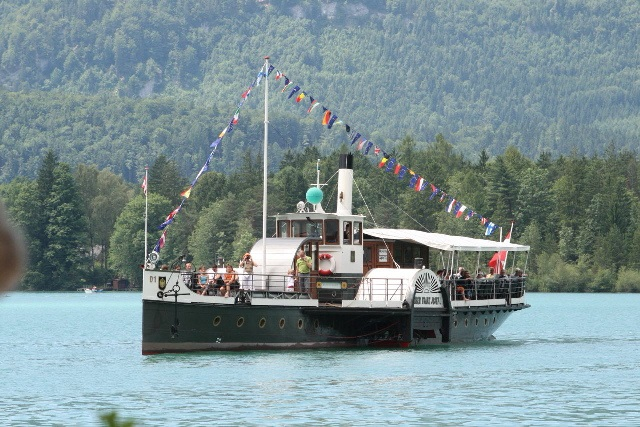
Franz Josef I. on Lake Wolfgang

In Austria a small paddle steamer fleet operates. There is Gisela from 1872 in Gmunden at the Traunsee, Kaiser Franz Josef I. from 1873 in St. Gilgen at the Lake Wolfgang, Hohentwiel from 1913 in Hard (near Bregenz) at the Lake Constance and Schönbrunn from 1912 in Linz at the Danube.

== Bangladesh ==
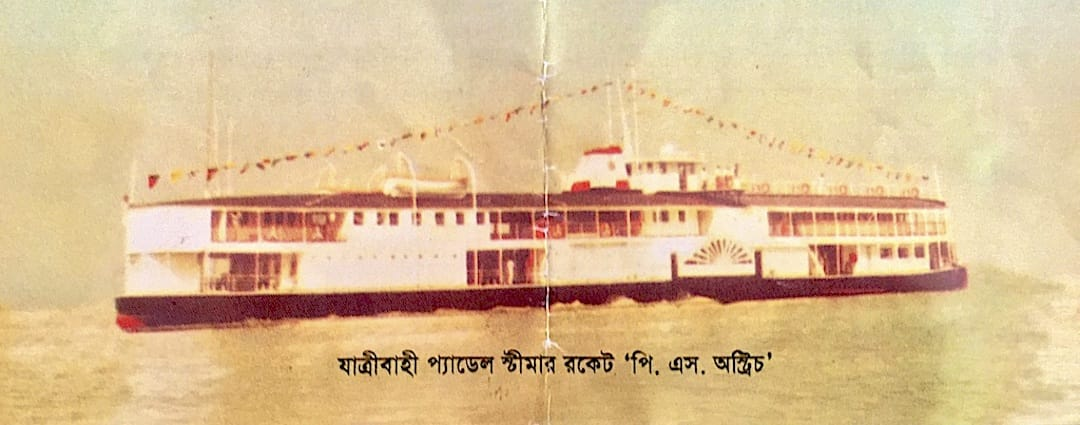
PS Ostrich

The fleet of four paddle steamers owned by the Bangladesh Inland Water Transport Corporation was withdrawn from commercial operation in 2022. As of 2024, the agency has undertaken renovation works for the PS Ostrich (1929), which has been leased to a private tour operator. An invitation to tender has been requested for leasing out the PS Lepcha (1938) and PS Tern (1950). The PS Mahsud (1928) is being retained by the government for tour purposes.

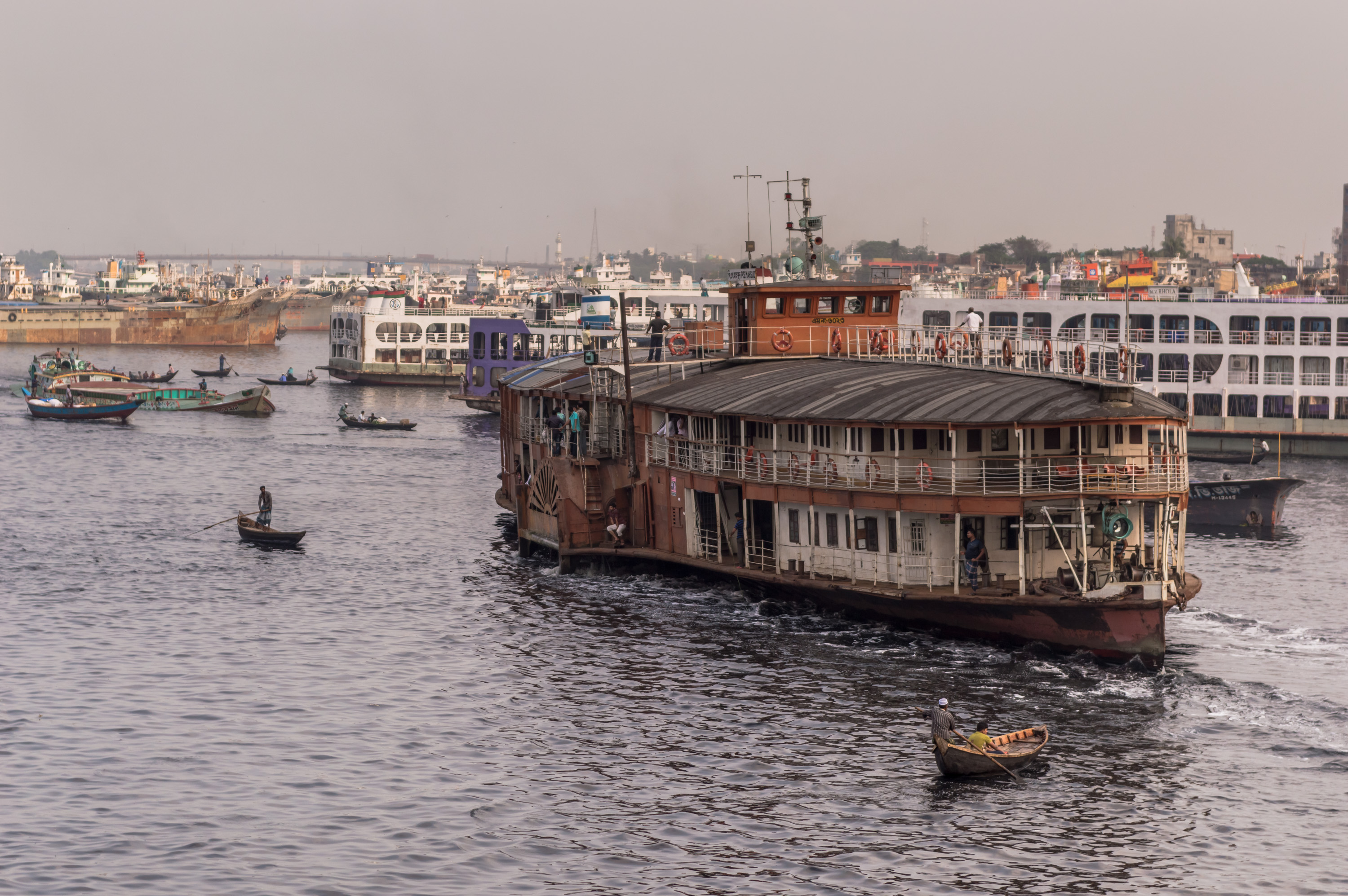
Paddle steamer PS Mahsud (1928) on the Buriganga

== Canada ==
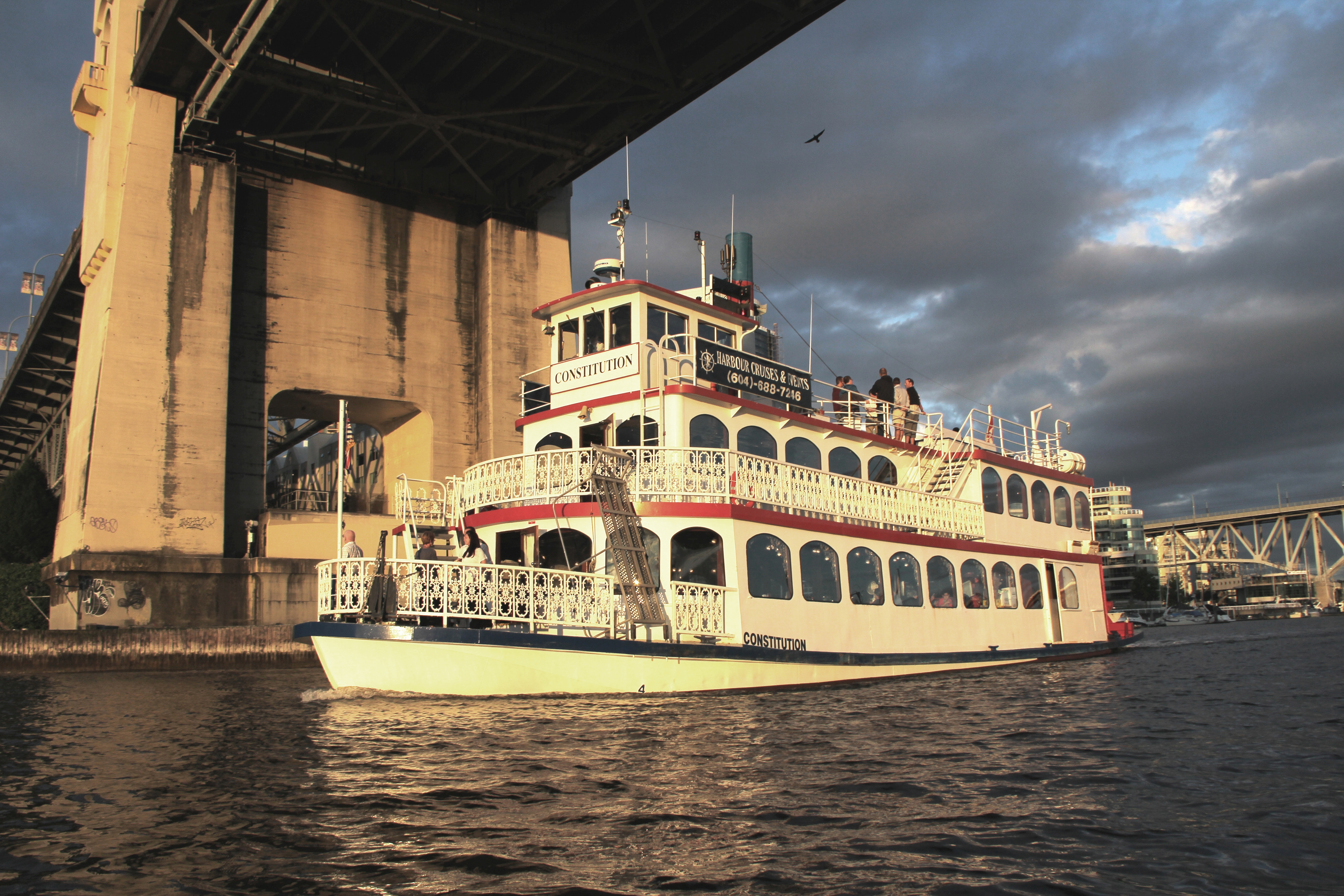
MPV Constitution in Vancouver, British Columbia, Canada

The ferries system in Toronto, Ontario, Canada operates PS Trillium, a paddle steamer originally built in 1910 and restored for operation since 1976. It is the last sidewheel-propelled vessel on the Great Lakes. Sister ships Bluebell and Mayflower became garbage scows and the former's hull is now a break wall in Toronto Harbour.

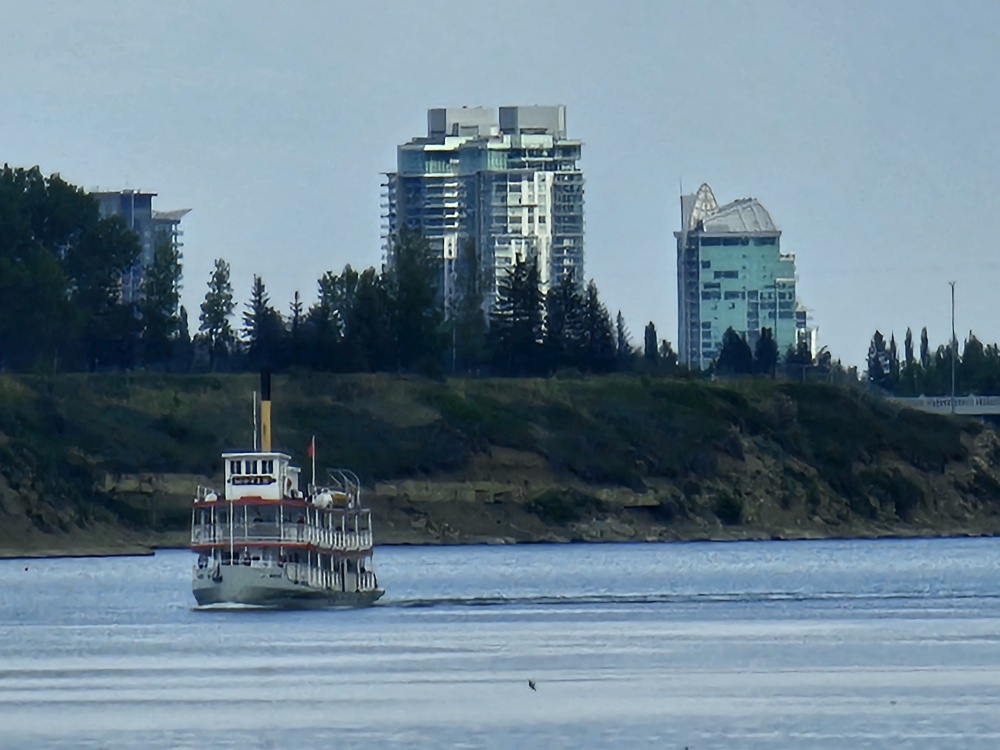
S.S. Moyie on Glenmore Reservoir on 03 June 2025

The S.S. Moyie is a half size replica of the original S.S. Moyie of Kaslo B.C. and it operates as part of Heritage Park, Calgary by providing cruises on the Glenmore Reservoir. More details about the original S.S. Moyie can be found in this article

== China ==
In order to thank the Qing government for its support of Japan in the Russo-Japanese War, Japan specially built a paddle yacht called "Yonghe Steamer" for Cixi. It can be viewed in the Summer Palace.

== Denmark ==
SS Hjejlen has been operation with the same company since she was built in 1861. Sailing passengers to and from Silkeborg and Himmelbjerget ever since, using her original steam engine she was built with.

== France ==
The former British paddle steamer, PS Princess Elizabeth, a veteran of the Dunkirk Evacuations, is preserved as a restaurant in Dunkirk harbour.

== Germany ==
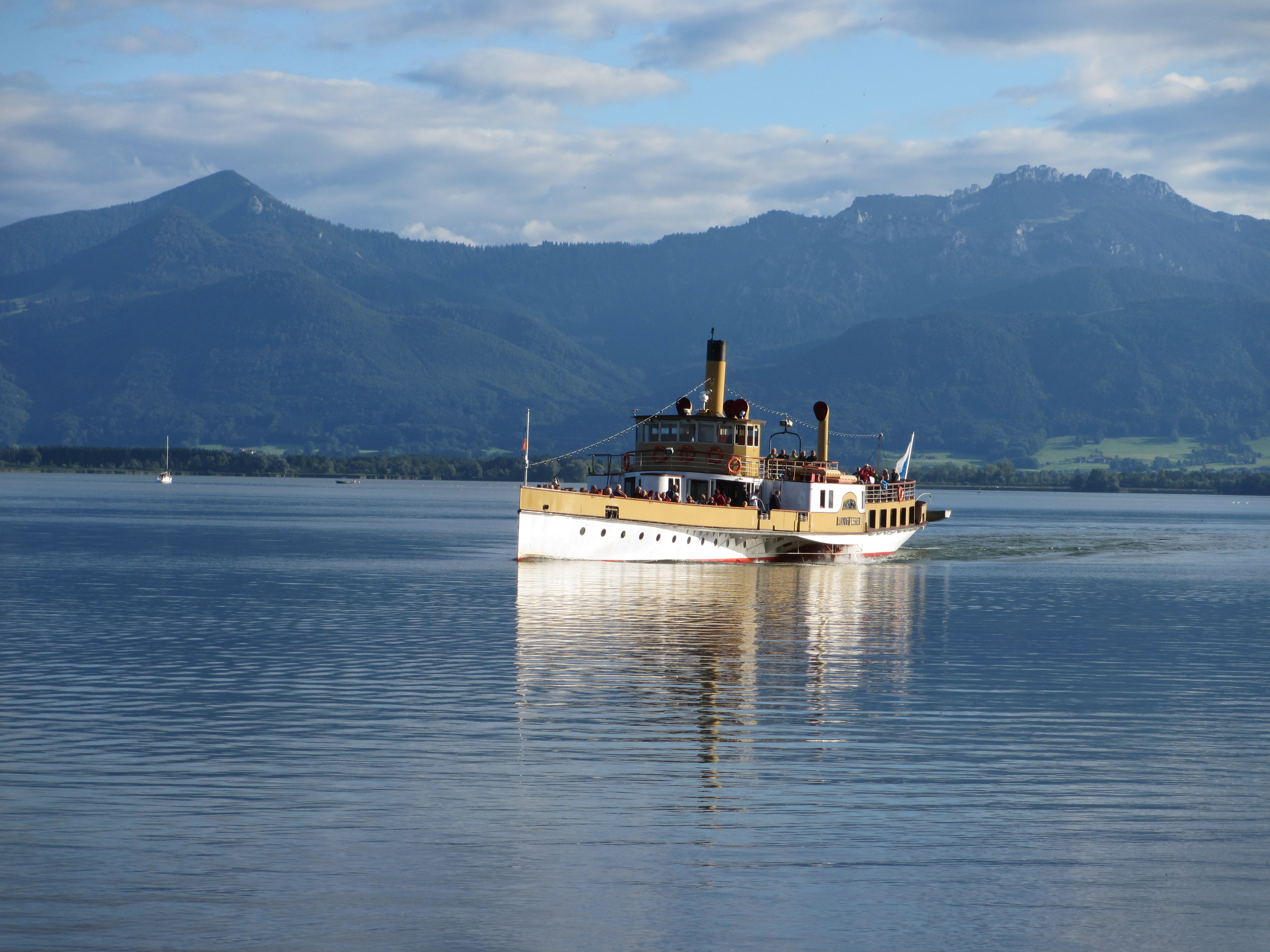
RMS Ludwig Fessler on Lake Chiemsee in 2012

The Elbe river Saxon Paddle Steamer Fleet in Dresden (known as "White Fleet"), Germany, is the oldest and biggest in the world, with around 700,000 passengers per year. The 1913-built Goethe was the last paddle steamer on the River Rhine. Previously the world's largest sidewheeler with a two-cylinder steam engine of 700 hp (520 kW), a length of 83 m (272 ft) and a height above water of 9.2 m (30 ft), Goethe was converted to diesel-hydraulic power during the winter of 2008/09.

Paddle wheelers are still in operation on some lakes in Southern Bavaria, such as Diessen (49 m, 161 ft) on Ammersee, built in 1908 and converted to a diesel system in 1975. It was completely rebuilt in 2006. As paddle wheelers have proven to be such a great tourist attraction, even a new one was built in 2002 on Ammersee, Herrsching, but it has never been powered by steam. On lake Chiemsee, RMS Ludwig Fessler (53 m, 174 ft) is still in regular service. It was built in 1926, but since 1973 it has also been powered by diesel engines. The original diesel engine was the last ship engine built by Maffei (no. 576). This engine has ended up in Switzerland to drive the newly renovated Neuchâtel, launched in 2013.

== Italy ==
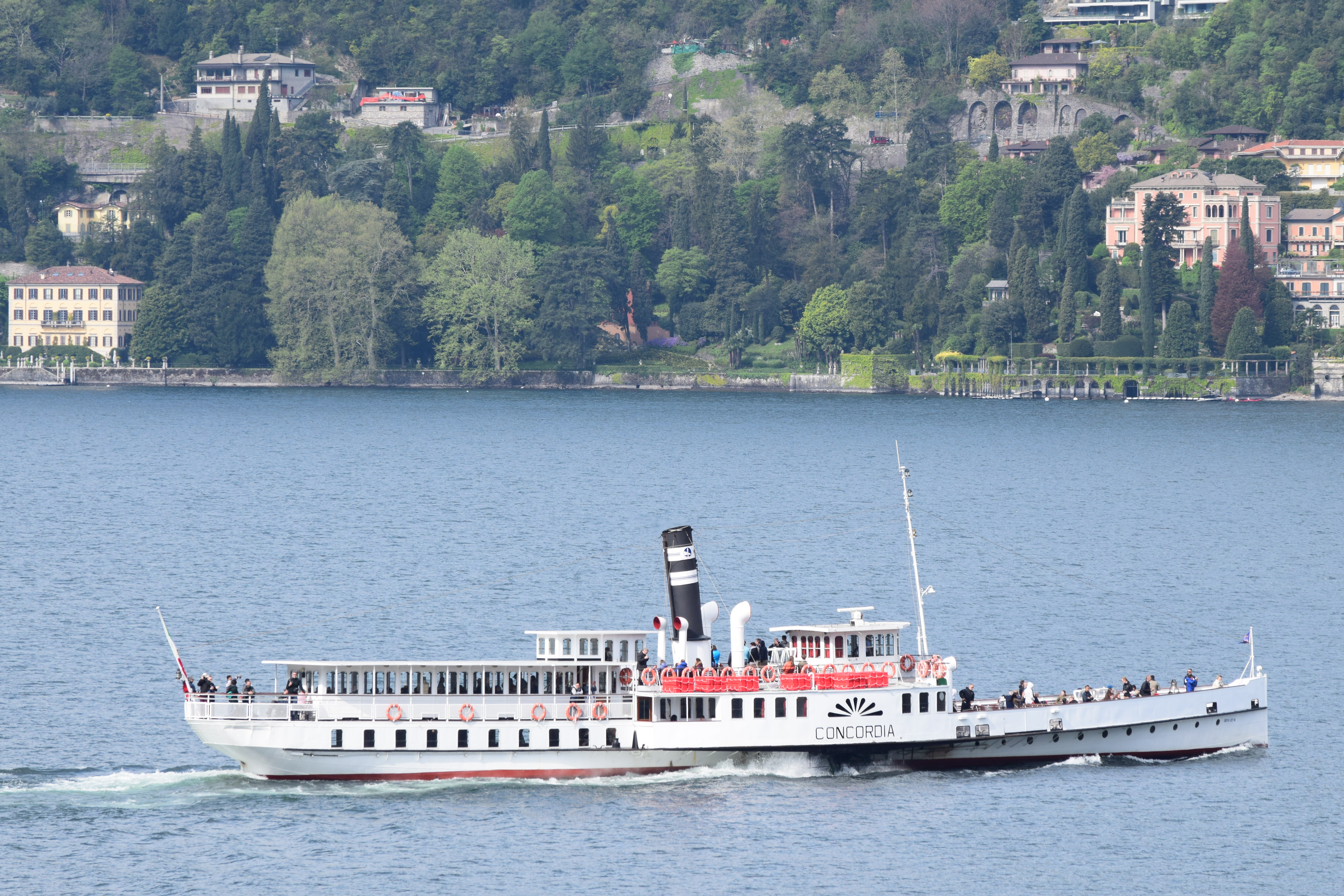
PS Concordia (1926) on Lake Como.

In Italy, a small paddle steamer fleet operates on Lake Como, Lake Maggiore and Lake Garda, primarily for tourist purposes. The paddle steamer Piemonte (1904) operates on Lake Maggiore, and sister paddle steamers Patria (1926) and Concordia (1926) operate on Lake Como. Former paddle steamers Italia (1909) and Giuseppe Zanardelli (1903) operate on Lake Garda; their steam engines, unlike in the ships that sail on lakes Como and Maggiore, were replaced with diesel engines in the 1970s, thus making them paddle motorships.

In addition to these five operational paddle steamers, the former paddle steamer Milano (1904) operates on Lake Como as a screw motorship, still retaining its (empty) paddle wheels; the decommissioned paddle steamer Lombardia (1908) is used as a floating restaurant in Arona, on Lake Maggiore; while the decommissioned paddle steamer Plinio (1903) lies at the bottom of the Lago di Mezzola, where it sank due to neglect in 2010.

== Japan ==
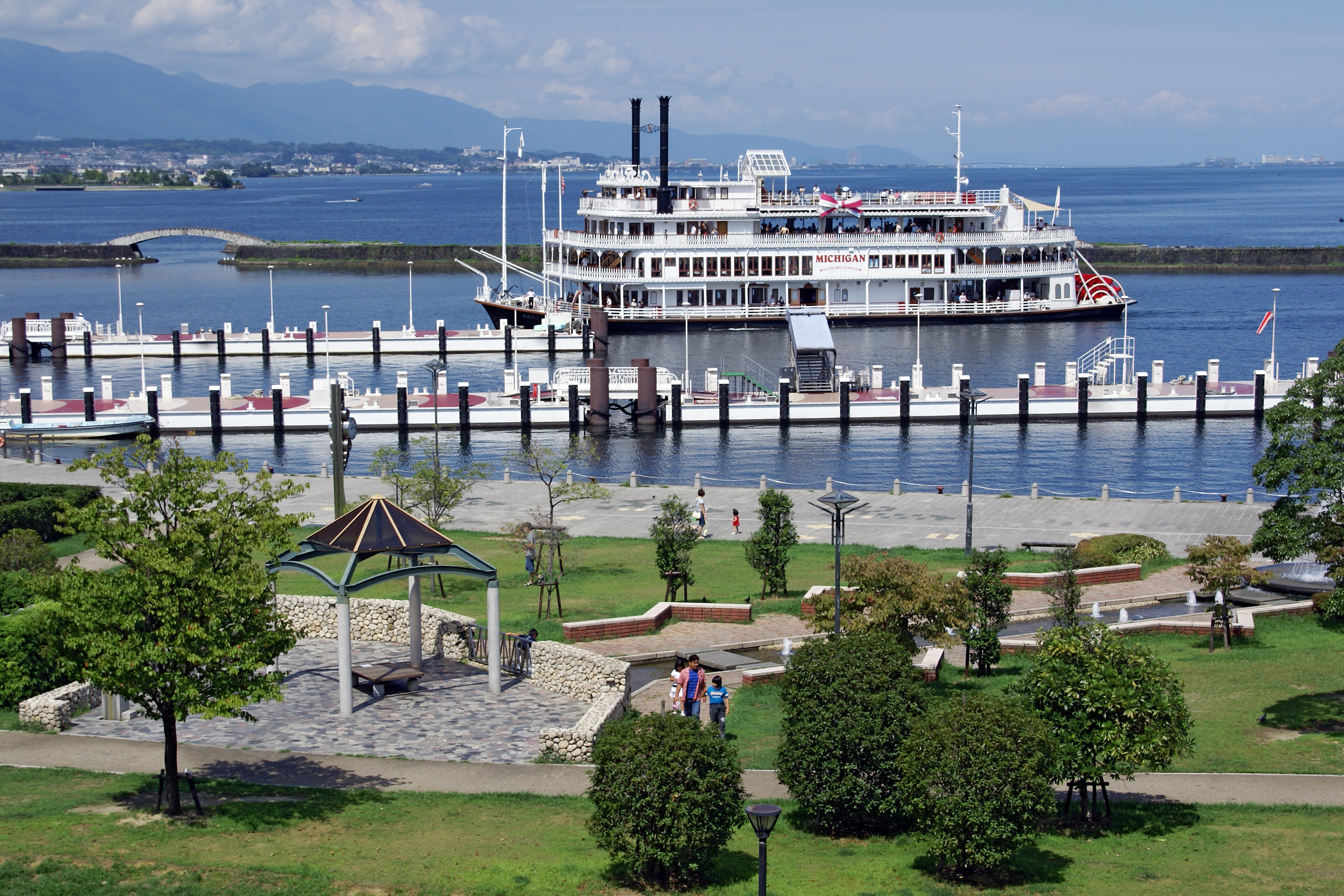
Michigan on Lake Biwa in 2007

Michigan is a paddle wheeler built in 1982, for cruising on Lake Biwa in Shiga Prefecture. The name is from Michigan, a sister region of Shiga Prefecture, also noted for lakes and for manufacturing.

== The Netherlands ==
Kapitein Kok is a paddle steamer built in 1911 for ferry service on the river Lek. It was fully restored in 1976 and is still in use today as a party ship. Queen Beatrix chartered the ship in 1998 as part of her 60th birthday celebrations. The paddle steamer De Majesteit was built in 1926. In 1958, a part of the movie G.I. Blues featuring Elvis Presley was shot on board of this ship.

== New Zealand ==
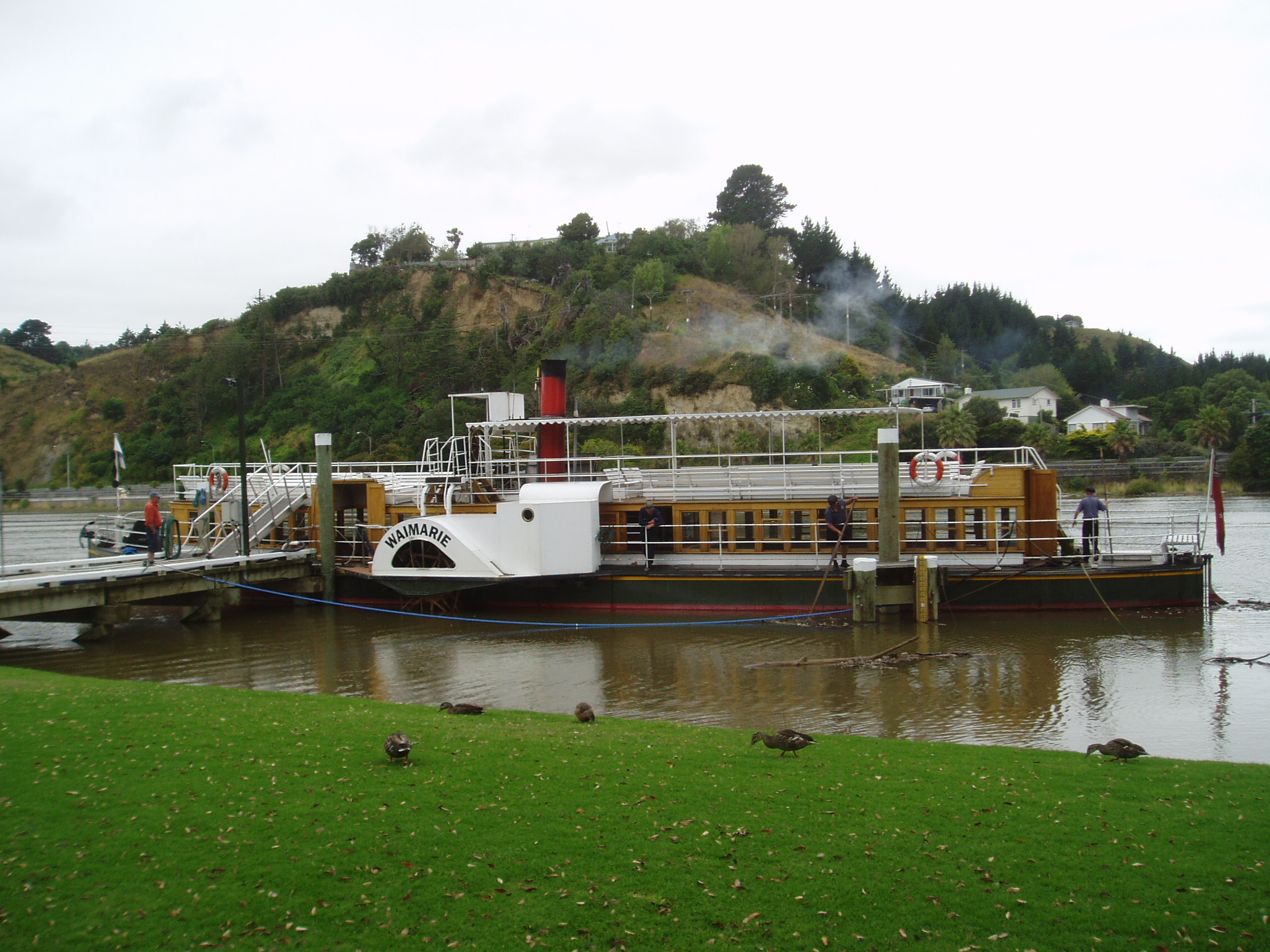
Waimarie on the Whanganui River.

The restored paddle steamer Waimarie is based in Wanganui. Waimarie was built in kitset form in Poplar, London in 1899, and originally operated on the Whanganui River under the name Aotea. Later renamed, she remained in service until 1949. She sank at her moorings in 1952, and remained in the mud until raised by volunteers and restored to begin operations again in 2000.

The 1907 Otunui Paddleboat operated on the Whanganui River until the 1940s in her original form as a tunnel screw riverboat. Lost from her mooring in a flood she was refloated in the late 1960s and rebuilt as a sternwheeled jetboat. Around 1982 she went overland to Lake Okataina and was converted to the sidepaddle vessel as she is today. Currently operating on the Wairoa River at Tauranga, this 17 m (56 ft), diesel powered vessel with hydraulic drive for the paddlewheels offers scenic cruises and charters.

== Norway ==
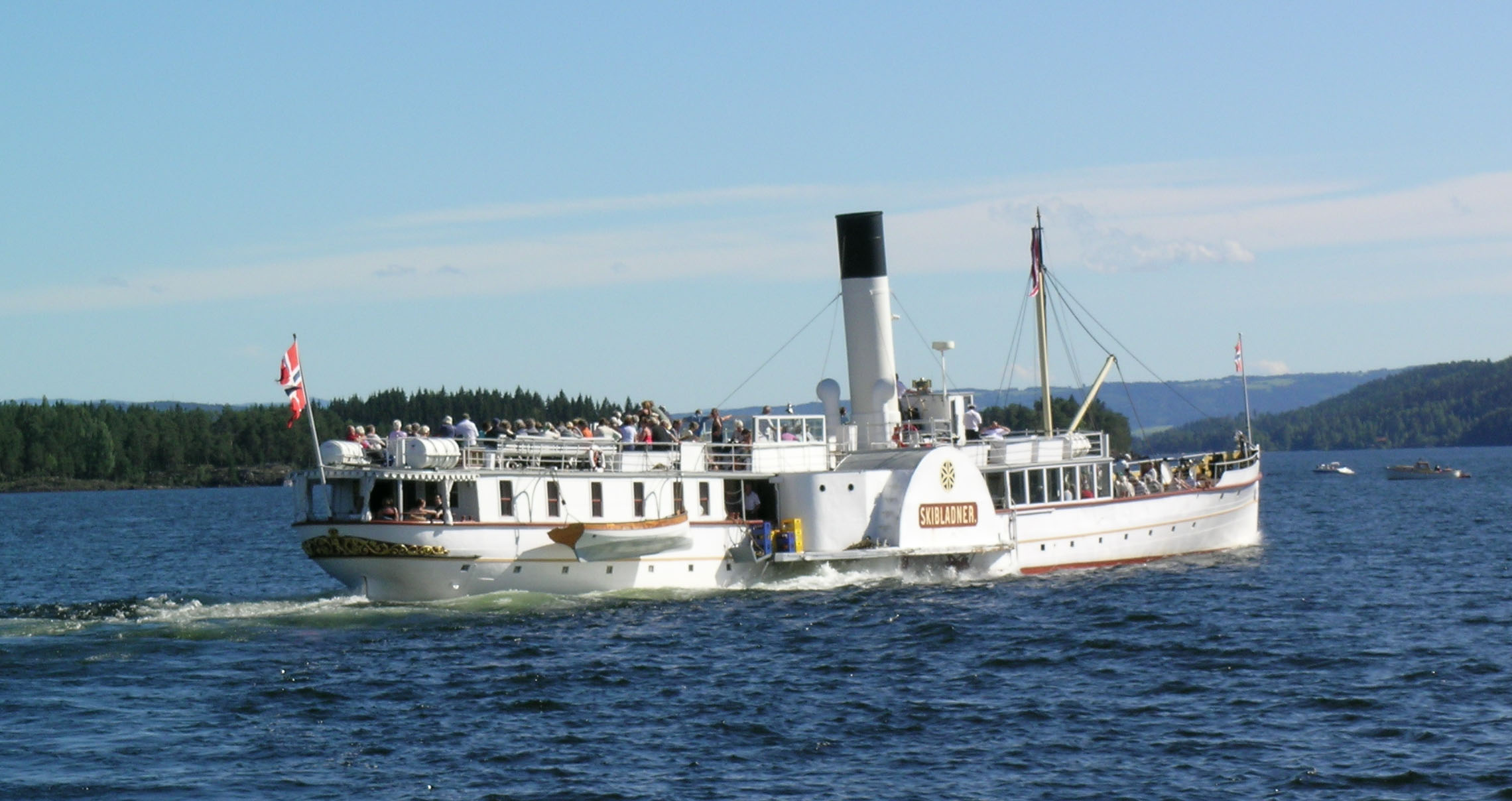
Skibladner in traffic on lake Mjøsa

Skibladner is the oldest steamship in regular operation. Built in 1856, she still operates on lake Mjøsa in Norway.

== Romania ==
As of 2024, two paddle steamers are operational in Romania. Tudor Vladimirescu, the oldest operational paddle steamer. Built in 1854, she is used for luxury cruises and as a protocol ship. The other paddle steamer in Romania is Borcea, built in 1914 at Turnu Severin, and owned by the School Inspectorate of Brăila.

== Switzerland ==
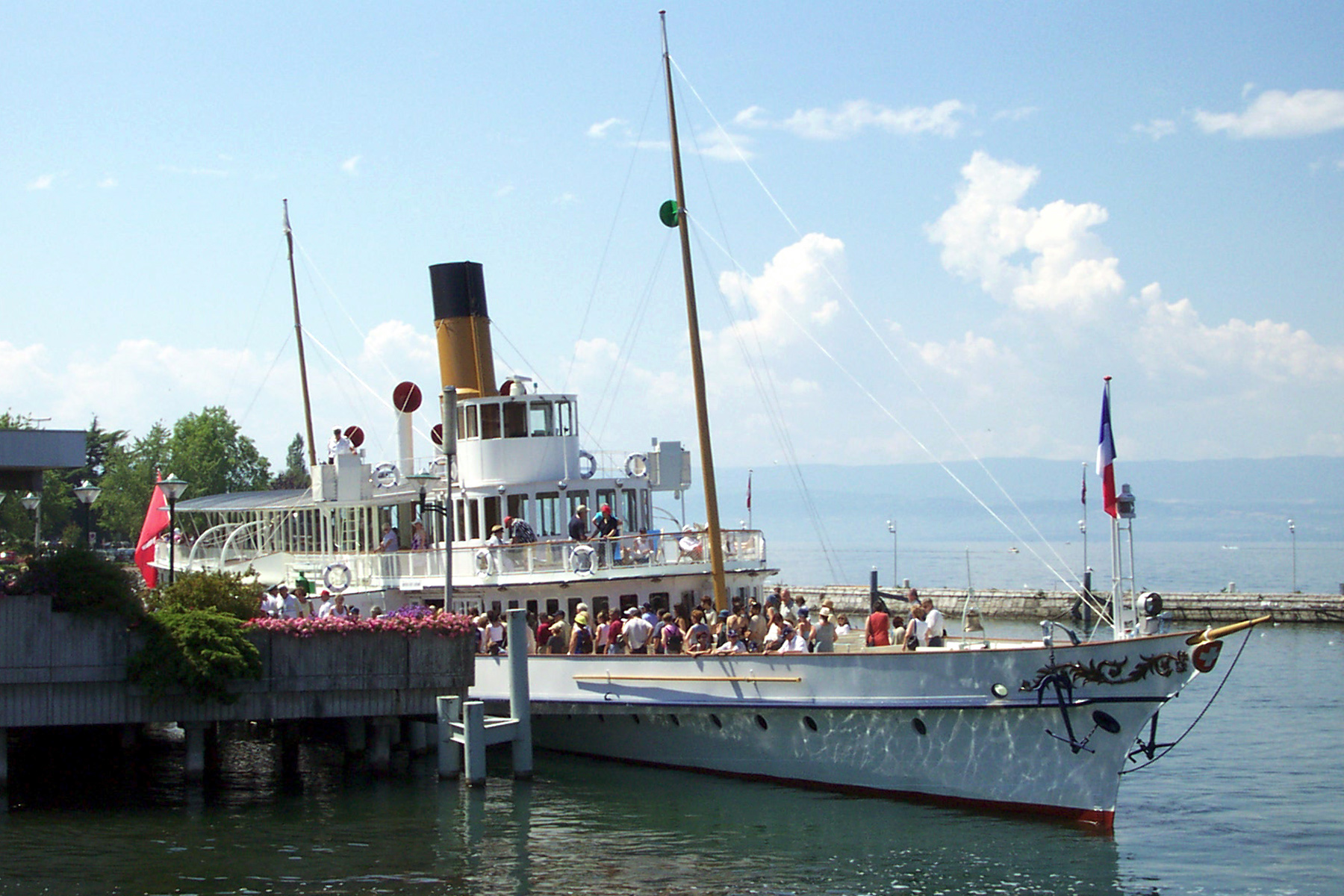
CGN paddle steamer Montreux leaving Evian-les-Bains in July 2002

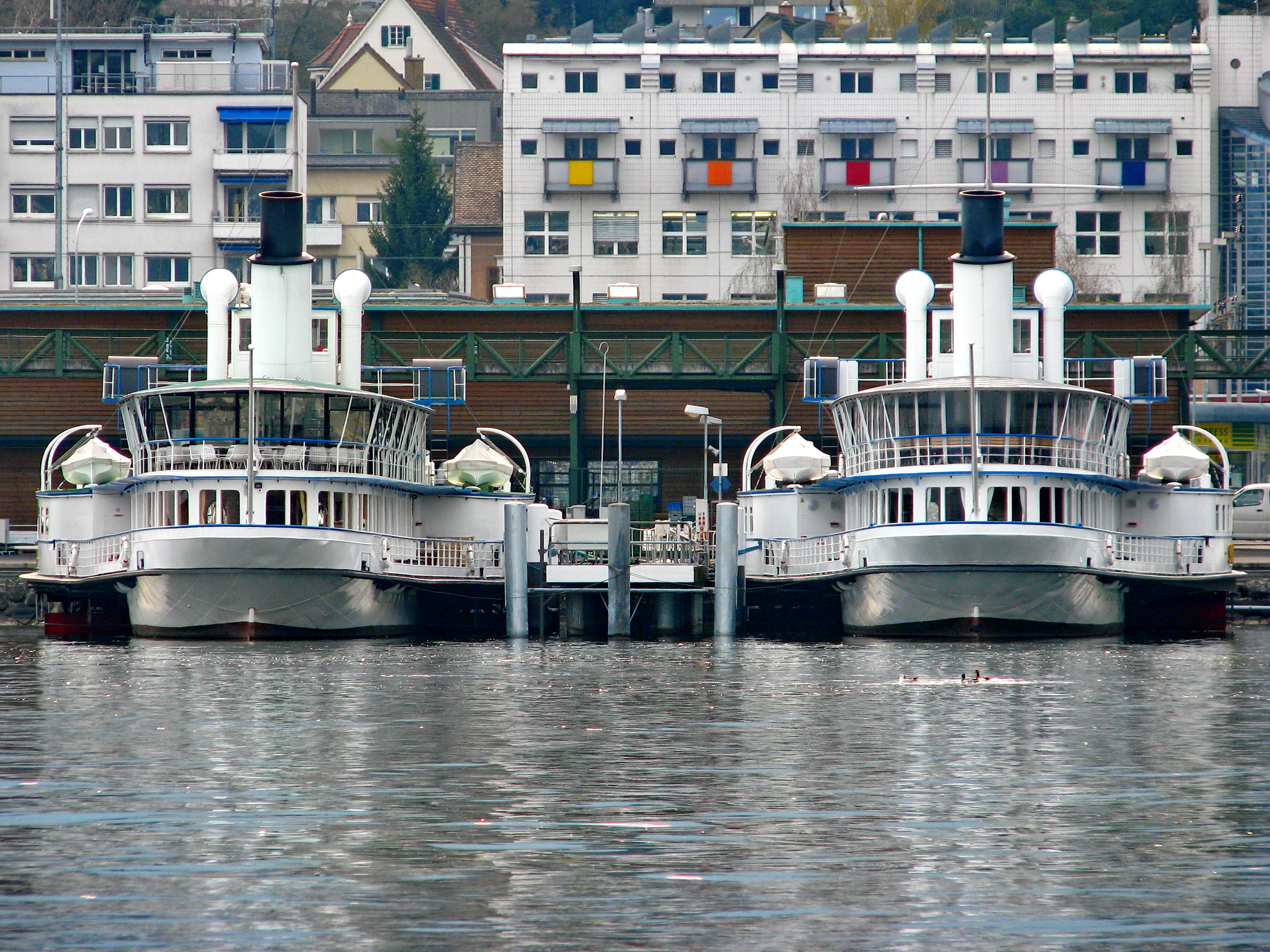
Stadt Zürich (to the left) and Stadt Rapperswil in Zürich-Wollishofen

Switzerland has a large paddle steamer fleet, most of the "Salon Steamer-type" built by Sulzer in Winterthur or Escher Wyss in Zürich. There are five active and one inactive on Lake Lucerne, two on Lake Zurich, and one each on Lake Brienz, Lake Thun and Lake Constance. Swiss company CGN operates a number of paddle steamers on Lake Geneva. Their fleet includes three converted to diesel electric power in the 1960s and five retaining steam. One, Montreux, was reconverted in 2000 from diesel to an all-new steam engine. It is the world's first electronically remote-controlled steam engine and has operating costs similar to state-of-the-art diesels, while producing up to 90 percent less air pollution.

=== Active vessels ===
Lakes of Biel, Morat and Neuchâtel (connected by channels):

- Neuchâtel (built in 1912)

Lake Brienz:

- Lötschberg (1914)

Lake Geneva:

- Montreux (1904), Vevey (1907), Italie (1908),La Suisse II (1910), Savoie (1914), Simplon (1919), Rhône III (1927)

Lake Lucerne:

- Stadt Luzern (1928, last steam ship built for Switzerland),
  Uri (1901, oldest Swiss paddle wheel steamer),
  Schiller (1906),
  Gallia (1913),
  Unterwalden (1902)

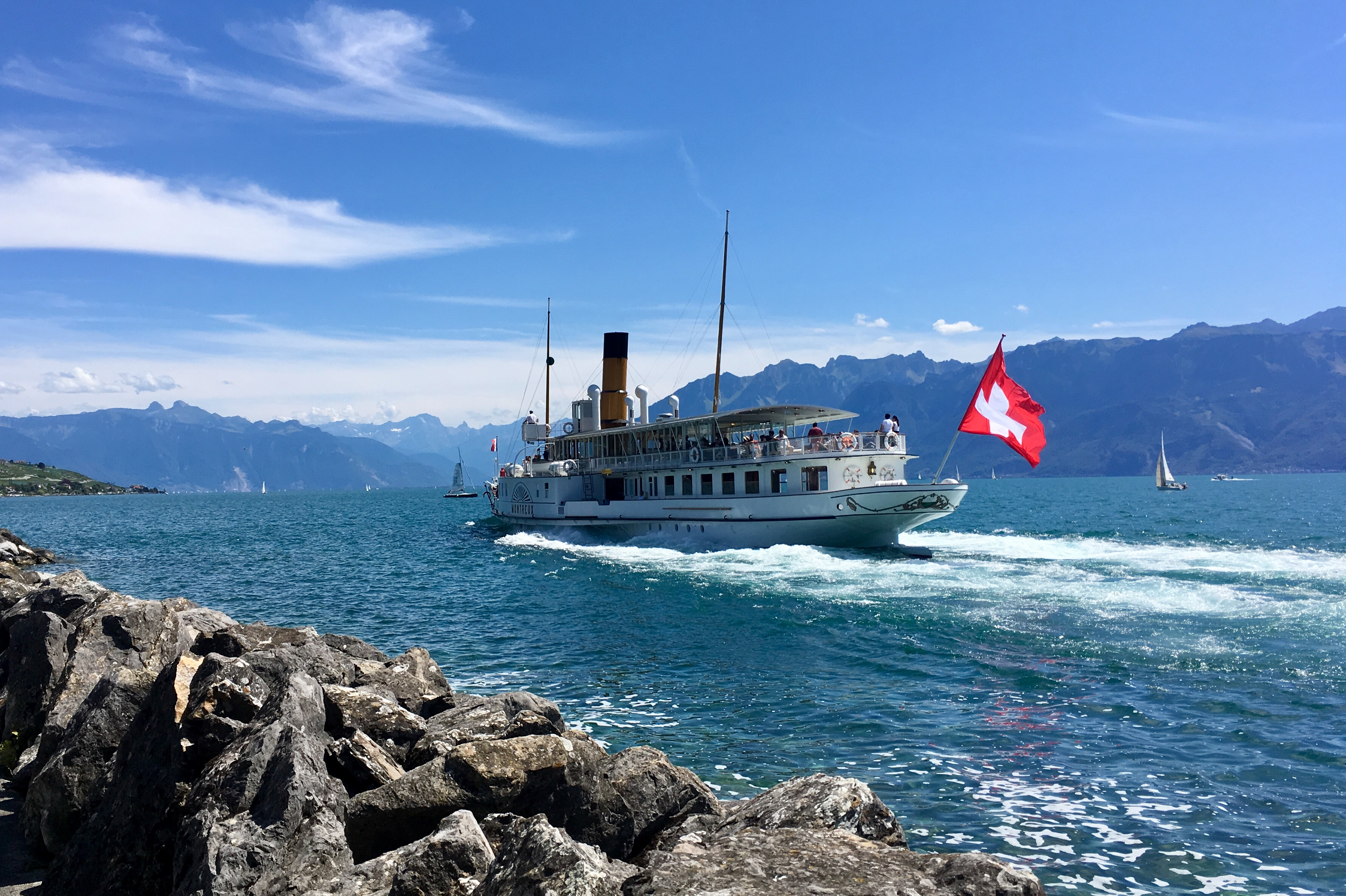
SS Montreux outside Lutry, Lake Geneva in August 2018

Lake Thun:

- Blümlisalp (1906)

Lake Zurich:

- Stadt Zürich (1909), Stadt Rapperswil (1914)

Note: The oldest active Swiss steamship is Greif (1895, on the Greifensee) with screw propulsion.

== United Kingdom ==
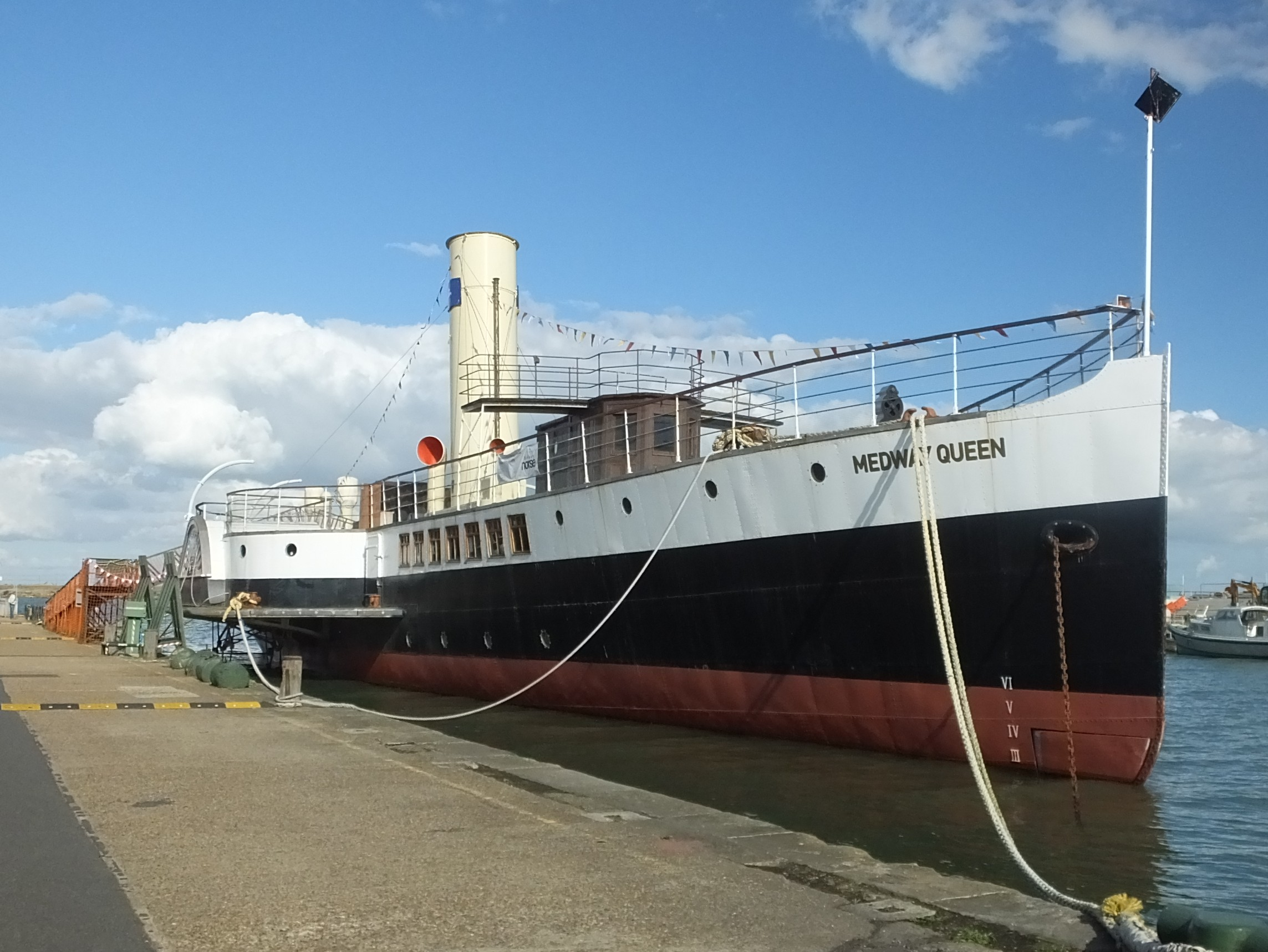
PS Medway Queen (1929) moored at Gillingham, Kent.

PS Waverley, a Clyde steamer built in 1947, is the last seagoing paddle steamer in the world. This ship sails a full season of cruises from ports around Britain, and sailed across the English Channel to commemorate the sinking of her predecessor of 1899 at the 1940 Battle of Dunkirk.

Based at Wareham, PS Monarch (one of the smallest passenger-carrying vessels of her type, with a passenger capacity of only 12) takes trips on the River Frome. Monarch is a side wheeler privately built at Chatham Historic Dockyard.

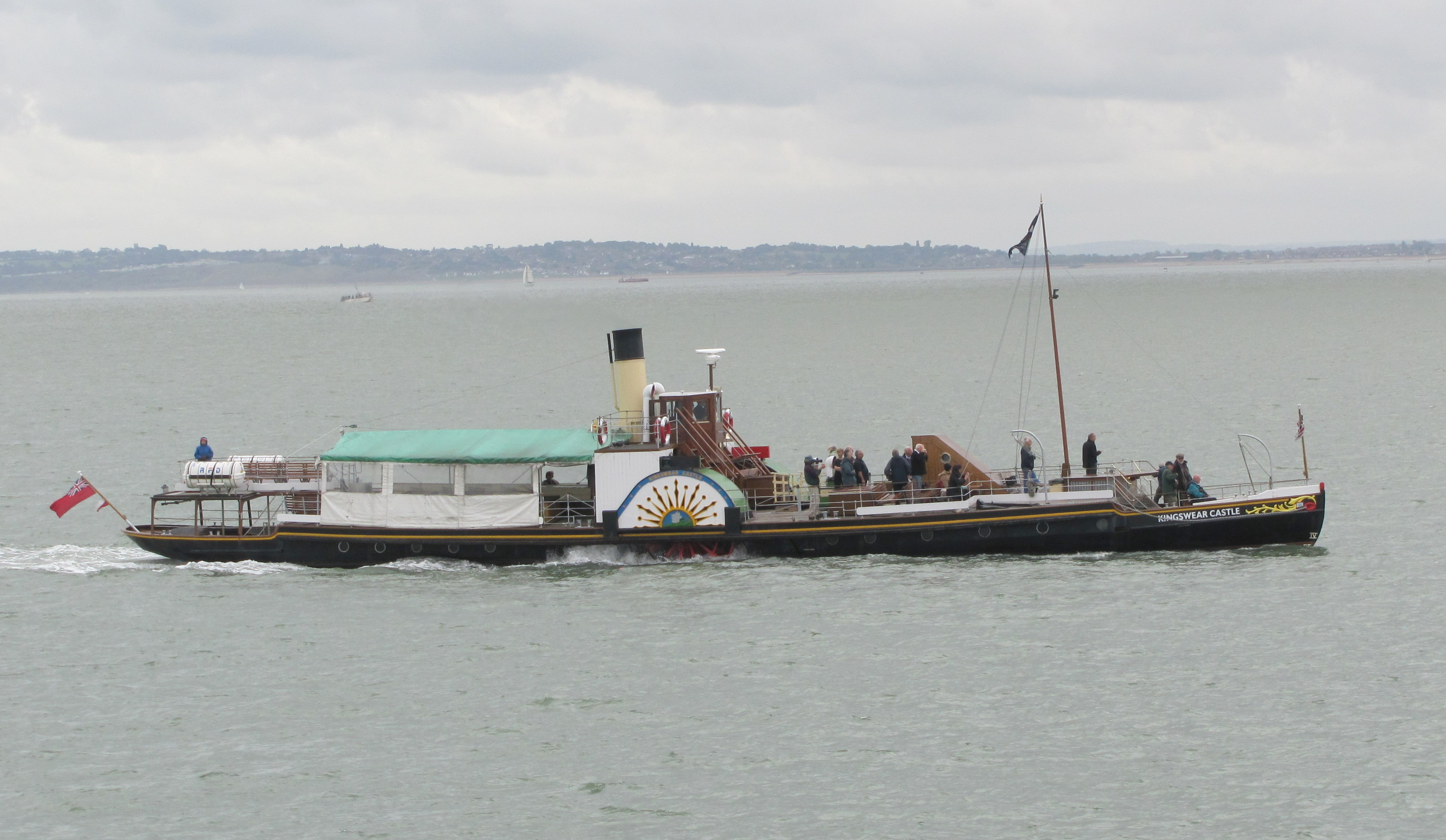
PS Kingswear Castle in 2010.

In the River Dart (Devon) PS Kingswear Castle (a coal-fired river paddle steamer) operates short cruises from Dartmouth and trips between Dartmouth and Totnes at high tide.

PS Maid of the Loch was the last paddle steamer built in the United Kingdom and was completed in 1953 for service on Loch Lomond. She went out of service in 1981 but is now open as a static museum ship and restoration is ongoing subject to funding.

PS Medway Queen was built in 1929 and operated as a pleasure steamer in the River Medway and Thames Estuary. In 1939, she was converted to a paddle minesweeper and was one of the Little Ships of Dunkirk. Returning to civilian use, a restoration project including the rebuilding of her hull was completed in 2013. She is moored at Gillingham, Kent and is open to visitors.

PS Wingfield Castle, launched in 1934 for service on the Humber Estuary and is now a static museum ship at the National Museum of the Royal Navy, Hartlepool.

PS Tattershall Castle, sister ship to Wingfield Castle and a ferry on the Humber between Kingston-upon-Hull and New Holland until 1973. She now serves as a floating pub on the Thames at Victoria Embankment in London.

== USSR ==
In the USSR, river paddle steamers of the type Iosif Stalin (project 373), later renamed Ryazan-class steamships, were built until 1951. Between 1952 and 1959, ships of this type were built for the Soviet Union by Óbudai Hajógyár Budapest factory in Hungary. In total, 75 type Iosif Stalin/Ryazan sidewheelers were built. They are 70 m (230 ft) long and can carry up to 360 passengers. Few of them still remain in active service.

== United States ==
A few paddle steamers serve niche tourism needs as cruise boats on lakes (Note: As a sampling: Steamers operate on Lake Champlain, Lake George, and Lake Winnipesaukee in the U.S. Northeast as of 2026.) and others, such as Delta Queen, although she is currently in layup, still operate on the Mississippi River. In Oregon, several replica paddle steamers, which are non-steam-powered sternwheelers built in the 1980s and later, are operated for tourism purposes on the Columbia and Willamette Rivers.

The sternwheel towboat Lone Star was built in 1868 and operated on the upper Mississippi River as a dredge and towboat. She was declared a National Historic Landmark on 20 December, 1989. She currently resides at the Buffalo Bill Museum drydocked and indoors.

The City-class ironclad USS Cairo was built in 1861 as a union gunboat for use on the Mississippi River. She is equipped with an inboard paddlewheel powered by 2 cylinder marine steam engines. She sank in 1862 after striking two confederate torpedoes. The wreck was raised in 1964 and is preserved today at the Vicksburg National Military Park. She is the only known surviving example of an inboard paddle steamer.

The sternwheel snag boat W. T. Preston was launched in 1929 for the United States Army Corps of Engineers and worked from Olympia, WA to Blaine, WA on Puget Sound, removing deadheads and clearing channels. She was retired in 1981, being retired by the newer Puget. In June 1983 she was dry berthed on the waterfront near Cap Sante. She is owned and operated by the City of Anacortes' City Museum.

Snagboat Montgomery is only one of two surviving sternwheel snagboats, the other being the W. T. Preston. Montgomery was built in 1925 by the Charleston Dry Dock and Machine Company of Charleston, South Carolina, and operated by the United States Army Corps of Engineers. Montgomery cleared snags and obstructions from the Coosa, Alabama, Apalachicola, Chattahoochee, Flint, Black Warrior, and Tombigbee Rivers until her retirement. She was restored in 1984 and again in 2004. Montgomery now operates as a dry berthed museum ship at the Tom Bevill Lock and Dam Visitor Center in Pickensville, Alabama.

One of the last paddle steamers built in the U.S. was the dredge William M. Black, built in 1934 and now a National Historic Landmark.

A sister ship of the William M. Black is also the side wheeled dredge Captain Meriwether Lewis which was built in 1932 for the U.S. Army Corps of Engineers and helped dredge the Missouri River System. It was retired in 1976 and converted to a beached museum ship in Brownville, Kentucky along the Missouri River where it sits today.

The William S. Mitchell, sistership of the Captain Meriwether Lewis and William M. Black is also a side wheeled dredge. She was built in 1934 by the U.S. Army Corps of Engineers as a dustpan dredge and served on the Missouri River. In 1979 she was retired from dredging duties and was relocated to the Army Corps of Engineers harbor in Gasconade where it was hoped she would become a museum. However in the Great Flood of 1993 the Mitchell broke her mooring lines and floated downstream, smashing into 4 bridges and caused its aft deck house and smoke stacks to collapse. The dredge was then subsequently taken out of the river and tied up at Wood River, Illinois. She was expected to be scrapped when BB Riverboats acquired her and transformed the dredge into the floating haunted house USS Nightmare. During September through November the Mitchell is moored in Newport, Kentucky as the USS Nightmare haunted house. Once the season is over she is towed a few miles back up the river where she is moored for the rest of the year.

Belle of Louisville is the oldest operating Mississippi River-style steamboat and was named a National Historic Landmark in 1989. Previously named Idlewild and Avalon, Belle of Louisville is based in downtown Louisville, Kentucky.

The Shelburne Museum of Vermont features the paddle steamer Ticonderoga, a preserved Lake Champlain ferry, which was transported overland to the museum after being retired from service in 1953, and is now open for tours.

The San Francisco Maritime National Historical Park is host to the Eureka, which is the largest existing wooden ship in the world. She is still afloat as a museum ship.

Portland is a preserved steam-powered sternwheel tug based in Portland, Oregon, that is listed on the U.S. National Register of Historic Places.

Pilgrim Belle is a diesel-powered sternwheeler built in 1993 which does harbor cruises in Plymouth, Massachusetts.

American Queen Steamboat Paddlewheel in action

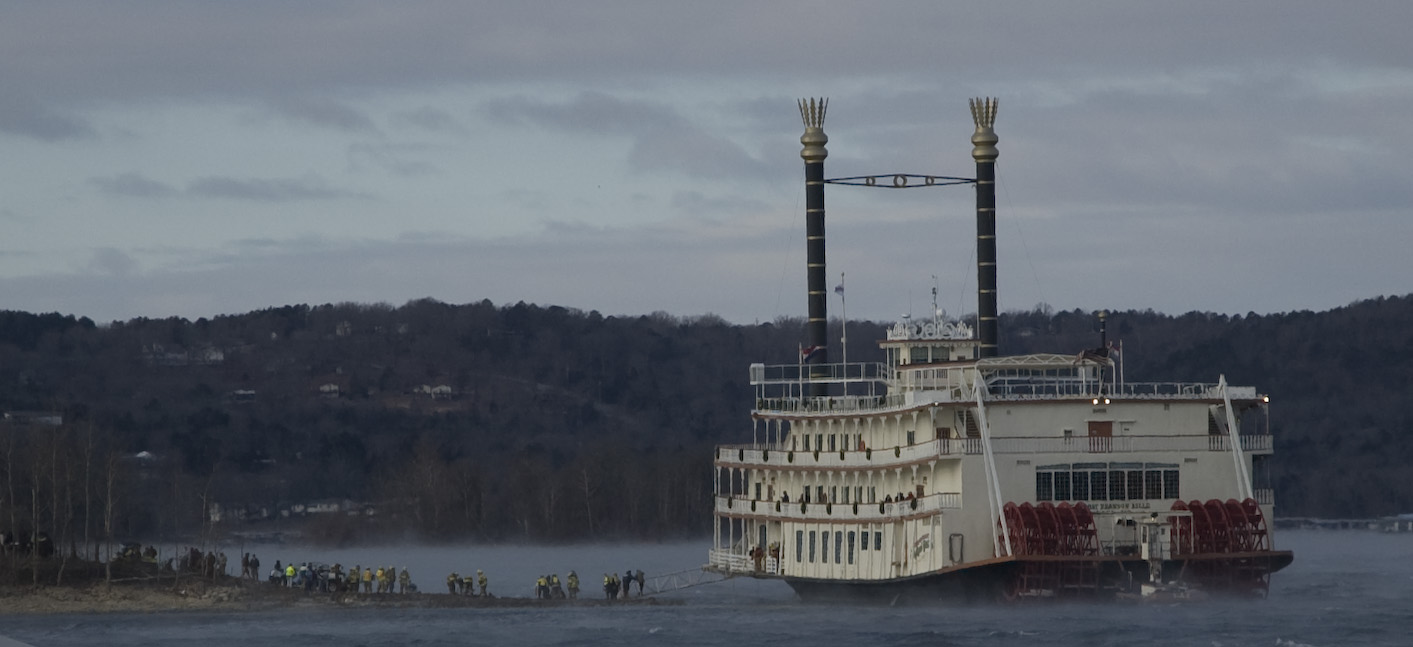
Showboat Branson Belle on Table Rock Lake in Branson, Missouri, is a sternwheeler showboat. It is run aground in this picture.

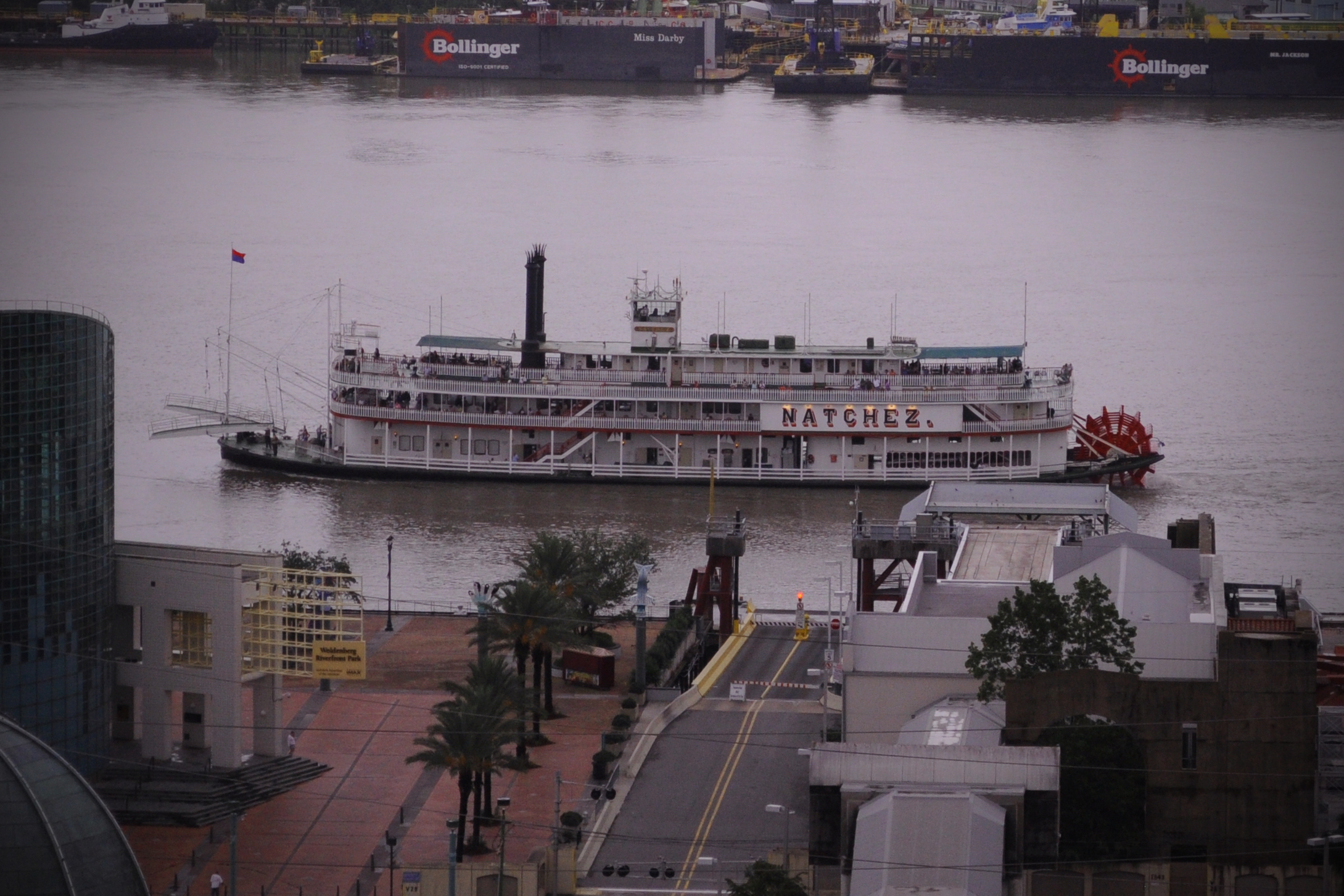
Str. Natchez on the Mississippi

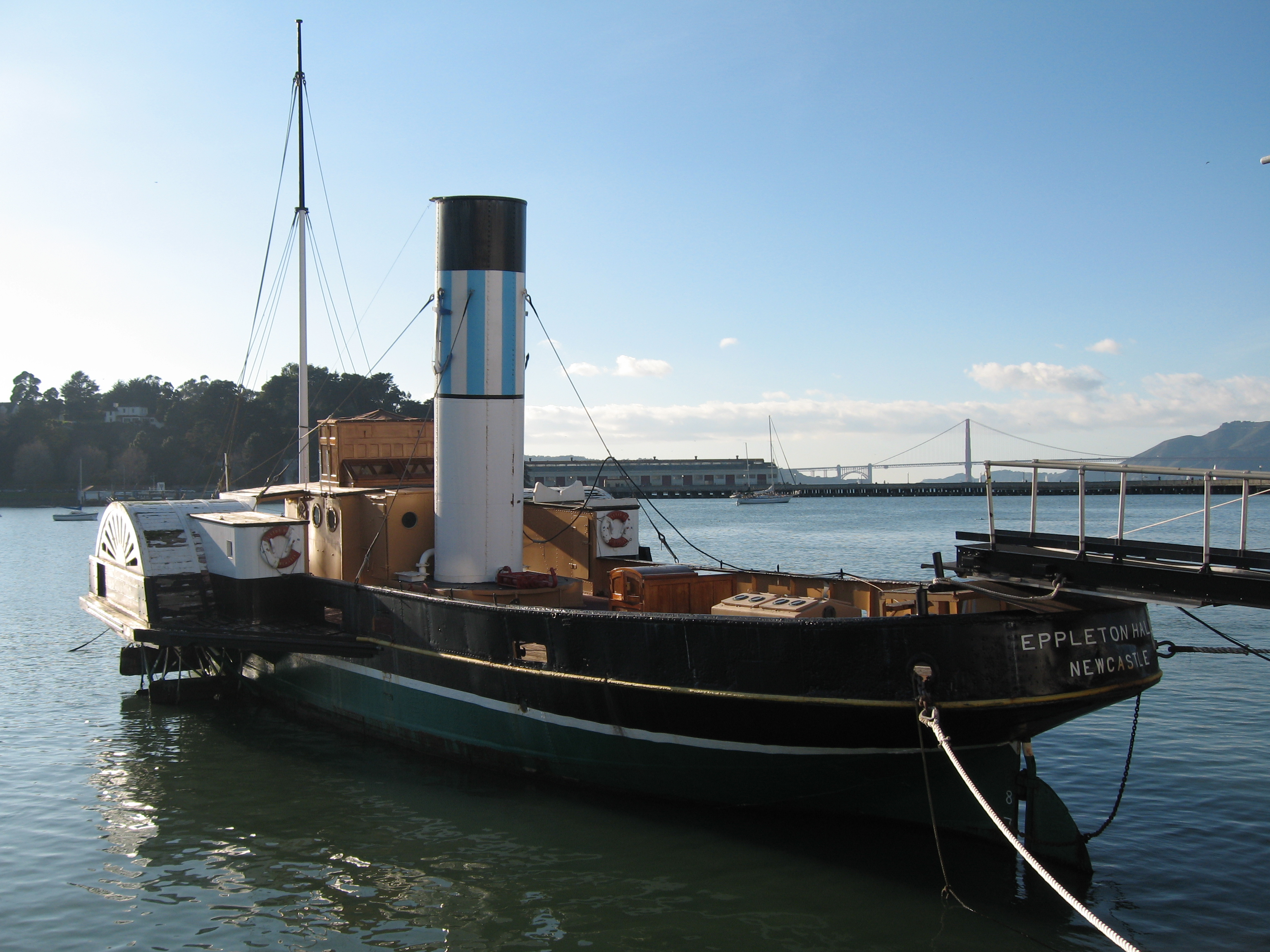
Eppleton Hall in San Francisco

== See also ==
- Disney riverboats
- List of Murray–Darling steamboats
