= Murray River Queen =

Australian paddle vessel

PV Murray River Queen
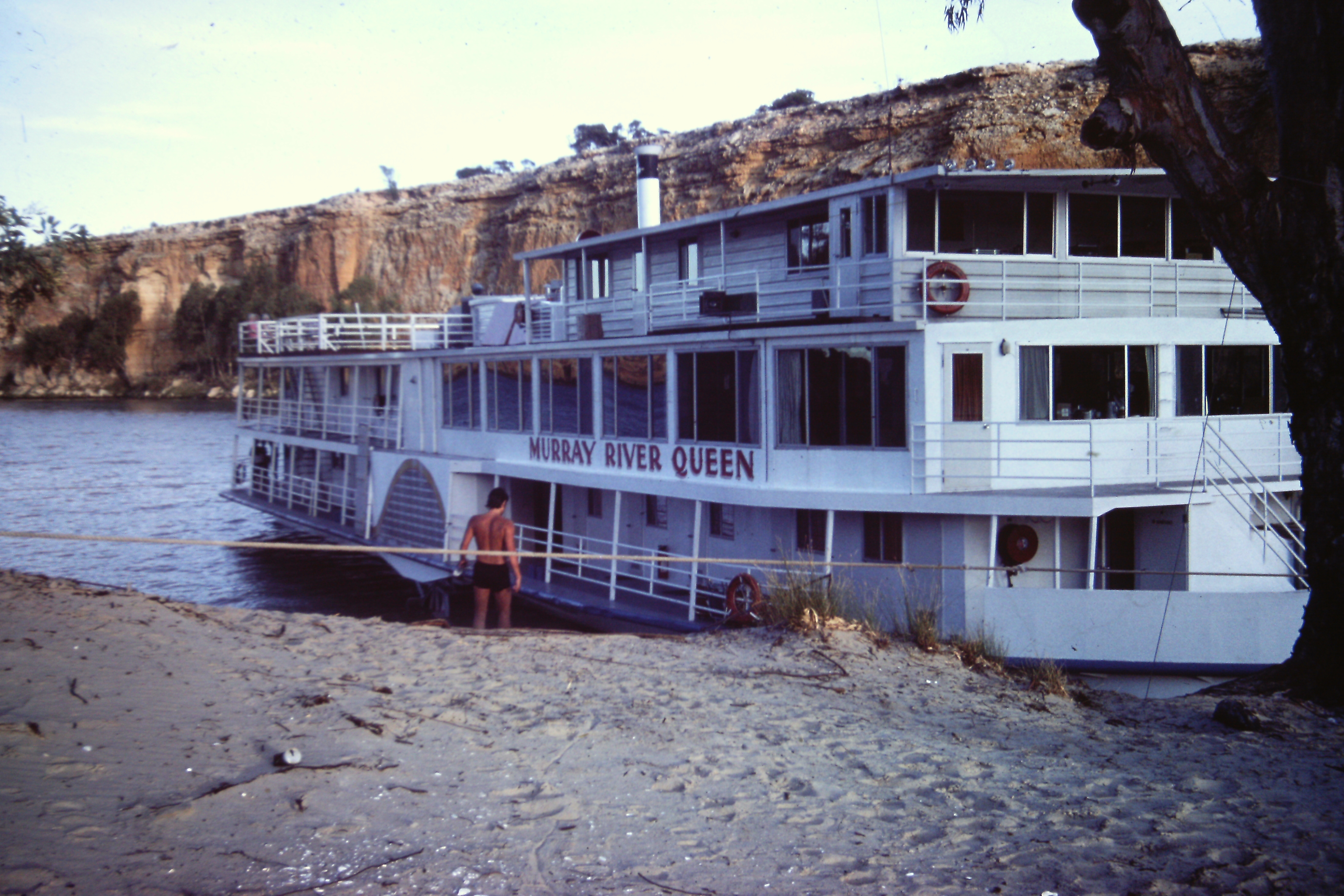

History

Australia
- Name: PV Murray River Queen
- Builder: Keith Veenstra
- Laid down: 1972
- Completed: 1974
- In service: 1974
- Out of service: 1993
- Status: Floating restaurant and hotel at Loxton

General characteristics
- Type: River boat
- Tonnage: 878.97
- Length: 156.36 feet (47.66 m)
- Beam: 26 feet (7.9 m)
- Depth: 7.7 feet (2.3 m)
- Installed power: 205 horsepower (153 kW)
- Propulsion: Side paddle wheels
- Speed: 14 kilometres per hour (7.6 kn)

PV Murray River Queen is an Australian paddle vessel built at Hindmarsh Island in 1974 as a luxury passenger cruise boat. She was a tourist boat carrying passengers on the Murray River in South Australia. For many years, her home port was Goolwa where she offered week-long cruises operated by her builders, the Veenstra family. She was the first of several large boats built by the Veenstras for the Murray River, they later also built the MV Murray Explorer and PS Murray Princess. The Murray River Queen is now permanently moored at Loxton, South Australia.

Murray River Queen retired from regular service in 1993, and spent ten years initially as a floating hotel at Goolwa, then being stored near Mannum. In 2003, she was moved to Waikerie, South Australia, running dinner cruises and occasional longer trips until 2012. For three years she operated as a working hostel for backpackers, then as nostalgic accommodation and a restaurant.

In August 2017, Murray River Queen was moved from Waikerie 200 km upstream to Renmark. As the ship was no longer registered and legal to cruise under her own power, the journey was made mostly under tow by PS Oscar W, a 109-year-old paddlesteamer that used to tow barges carrying wool from stations to the markets. After some maintenance in the dry dock on Ral Ral Creek.Murray River Queen was then moored at the Renmark town dock as a tourist attraction, operating as a restaurant and bar. She formerly offered accommodation and live music on the top deck on weekends. In June 2021, D Neale became the new owner of Murray River Queen, and the rooms onboard the vessel were restored. An onboard café, The Fruit Packers Daughter's, currently operates and the vessel is now moored at Loxton on the Murray River.

== Technical details ==
Registration:

- Registration Opened: 1979
- Registration Closed: Current
- Registered Number: 385271
- Owner (at time of registration): Murray River Queen Pty Ltd.

Measurements:

- Engine: 205 Hp (Diesel)
- Dimensions: Length 156.36, Breadth 26, Depth 7.7 (feet)
- Tonnage: 878.97
- Construction: Steel
