= Skibladner =

Norwegian paddle steamer

Coordinates: 60.798389385°N 10.696885585°E

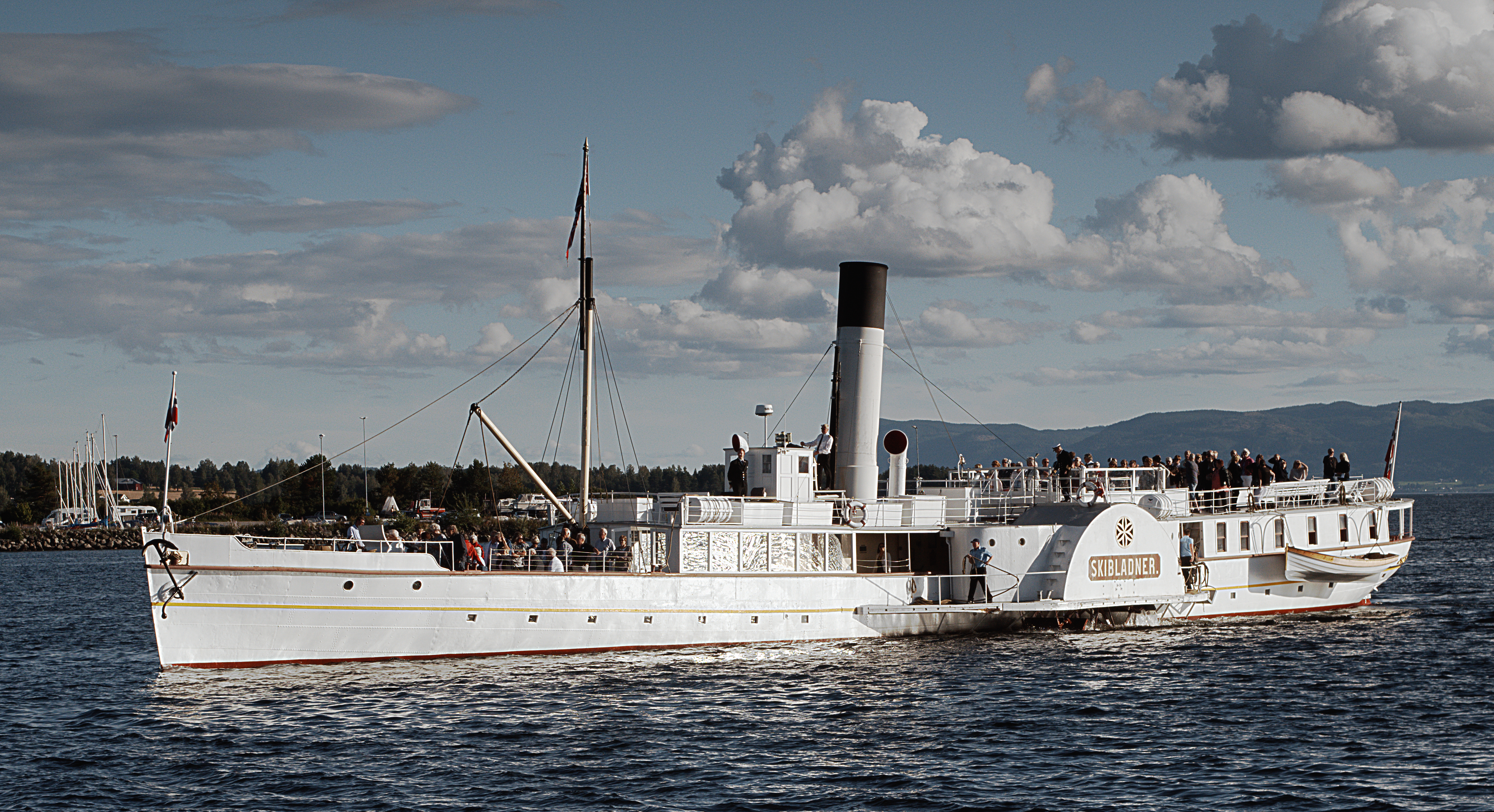
- PS Skibladner in Hamar

History
- Namesake: Skíðblaðnir
- Owner: A/S Oplandske Dampskipsselskap
- Port of registry: Norway
- Builder: Motala Shipyard
- Maiden voyage: 2 August 1856
- Refit: Aker Shipyard 1888
- Identification: IMO number: 8927981

General characteristics
- Tonnage: 206 registered tons
- Length: 50.1 m (164 ft)
- Beam: 5.06 m (16.6 ft) (excluding paddlewheels)
- Draft: 1.7 m (5.6 ft)
- Depth: 2.52 m (8 ft 3 in)
- Installed power: Triple-expansion steam engine
- Propulsion: 2 × 16 ft (4.9 m) sidewheels
- Speed: 12 knots (22 km/h; 14 mph) at 42 rpm
- Capacity: 230 passengers
- Crew: 6–16

Name pennant of the Skibladner, usually flown from the ship's mast

PS Skibladner is the world's oldest paddle steamer in timetabled service, and the only paddle steamer operating in Norway, sailing on lake Mjøsa.

Skibladner is a side-wheel paddle steamer, and her maiden voyage was on 2 August 1856. She was built to provide passage from the railway station in Eidsvoll to the towns of Hamar, Gjøvik, and Lillehammer along Mjøsa. She still operates the same route, but now offers sightseeing tours, dining, entertainment and cultural events during the summer months.

She was built by Motala Verkstad in Sweden and transported in pieces by rail and horse carts to Minnesund, where she was assembled and riveted together. She was originally equipped with twin-cylinder oscillating steam engines. In 1888, she was extended by 20 feet to provide more space and to allow for the installation of triple-expansion diagonal paddle engines built by Akers Mek. in Oslo, increasing her power to 606 h.p. She was then the fastest vessel in Norway with a top speed of 15 knots. She was converted from coal to oil-firing in the 1920s, and received new boilers in the 1980s. Today she is still powered by steam generated with fuel-oil burners in her twin boilers, and her normal operating speed is now 12 knots.

The ship sank twice while laid up for winter, the first time in 1937, and again in 1967, due to heeling caused by her moorings. On both occasions she was raised and underwent significant renovation with strong support from the Norwegian public.

The ship is often referred to locally as Mjøsas Hvite Svane, which translates to The White Swan of Mjøsa.

The ship’s home port is Gjøvik, where she is also laid up each winter beneath a specially built glass-covered construction. Her sailing season is from May to September, and the timetabled season is from late June to mid August.

On 14 June 2005, the Norwegian Directorate for Cultural Heritage made Skibladner subject to a preservation order. This was the first time in Norway that an operating vehicle had been listed.

The steamer is named after Skíðblaðnir, the ship of Freyr in Norse mythology.

== See also ==
- List of oldest surviving ships
- Tudor Vladimirescu (1854), oldest surviving paddle steamer
