= Tudor Vladimirescu (1854) =

Paddle ship built in 1854

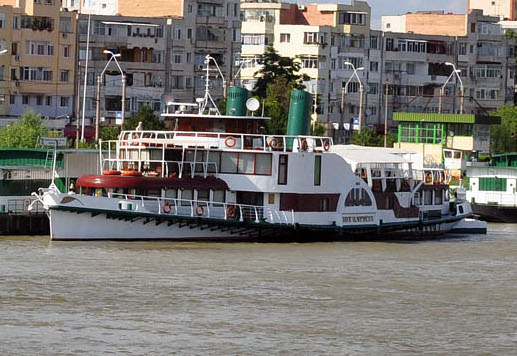
- Tudor Vladimirescu docked in Galați

History

Romania
- Namesake: Tudor Vladimirescu
- Owner: Navrom Galați
- Port of registry: Galați
- Builder: Óbuda shipyard
- Laid down: 1851
- Launched: 1854; 172 years ago
- Refit: Óbuda shipyard 1874; Turnu Severin shipyard 1919; Orșova shipyard 1953–1954; Galați shipyard, Brăila shipyard 2002–2003
- Identification: MMSI number: 264162180; MarineTraffic ID: 318994

General characteristics (current)
- Class & type: Pannonia-class paddle steamer
- Displacement: 342 tonnes (337 long tons)
- Length: 59.44 m (195.0 ft)
- Beam: 7.5 m (25 ft) (excluding paddlewheels)
- Height: 2.9 m (9 ft 6 in)
- Draught: 1.7 m (5 ft 7 in)
- Installed power: 604 hp (450 kW)
- Propulsion: 1 × two-cylinder double-expansion steam engine
- Speed: 10.0 kn (18.5 km/h)
- Capacity: 250 passengers
- Crew: 27

Tudor Vladimirescu is the oldest operational paddle steamer in the world, built in 1854 as a tugboat for the Austrian company DDSG. Currently, the ship is owned by Navrom Galați and is primarily used as a protocol ship for government and local officials and can be rented for luxury cruises.

== Construction ==
Tudor Vladimirescu was built between 1851 and 1854 as the tugboat Croatia at the Óbuda shipyard in Budapest. Together with her sister ship Pannonia, Croatia was part of the Pannonia-class of paddle tugs ordered by the Austrian company Donaudampfschiffahrtsgesellschaft (DDSG).

She had a length of 59.44 m (195.0 ft), a width of 7.54 m (24.7 ft) or 14.63 m (48.0 ft) with the paddle wheels, a height of 2.89 m (9 ft 6 in), and a draught of 1.46 m (4 ft 9 in) while carrying 70 tons of coal. Propulsion was provided by a two-cylinder steam engine, manufactured by the Escher Wyss & Cie. company from Zürich, which was supplied by two boilers. The engine powered two paddle wheels with 16 wooden blades each. The hull was made of iron while the deck and other components were made of wood. The captain's cabin along with the officers' quarters, kitchen, and dining area were on the deck, while the crew cabins were below the deck. The helmsman station was located on a plateau between the wheel arches.

== Service ==
=== 1854 to the end of World War I ===
In 1867, the original simple condensing engine was modernized to a double-expansion steam engine and the wooden paddle wheels were replaced with 10-bladed iron wheels. Croatia was used to transport cargo through the Iron Gates of the Danube between the ports of Brăila, Galați and Vienna. The ship was then converted to a passenger ship at the Óbuda shipyard in 1874.

During World War I, the ship was used by the Austro-Hungarian Armed Forces. In 1919, she was assigned to the Kingdom of Romania as war reparations by the Allied Commission. The ship was given to the NFR company (Navigația Fluvială Română, present-day Navrom) and registered at the Galați Port Authority.

=== Interwar period to World War II ===
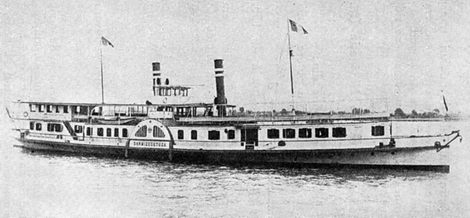
Sarmisegetuza in the 1920s

She then went through a refit at the Turnu Severin shipyard and received the name Sarmisegetuza. She had both 1st and 2nd class cabins with an interior capacity of 105 passengers while the benches placed on the exterior decks could fit another 150 people. She was used by NFR on the Brăila-Galați-Tulcea-Sulina and Turnu Severin-Calafat-Giurgiu-Oltenița-Turtucaia routes. In 1923, she was renamed to Grigore Manu, after the founder of the Romanian national navigation services. During this period, she also started to be used by the Romanian royal family as a luxury ship with King Ferdinand and Queen Marie boarding the ship in 1929, and King Carol II with Voivode Mihai in 1940.

By the start of World War II, Grigore Manu served all the passenger lines on the Danube with the week-long route from Turnu Severin to Sulina and back. During the Romanian campaign of the war, she was used as a hospital ship transporting wounded soldiers brought from Odesa to Galați. On 10 August 1941, the ship was damaged by shrapnel from Soviet aviation bombs and had to undergo repairs. In April 1943, the NFR ships Grigore Manu and Avram Iancu were brought to serve the Galați-Turnu Severin route. Grigore Manu was then sent for routine repairs in December. She was brought back in service in April 1944, although she had to be towed as the repair works were not completed. The ship continued repairs at the Galați shipyard between November 1944 and April 1945.

=== Communist period to present day ===
After the war, the ship received the name Tudor Vladimirescu and between 1953 and 1954, she underwent a major refit at the Orșova shipyard. The bridge of the ship was moved in front of the funnels. The funnels were also fitted with a manual folding system, for easier maintenance. By 1957, the ship was used by the Danube Tourism Company, able to transport 250 passengers per ride with the restaurant rooms on the bow and stern able to fit 170 tourists. In 1959, Tudor Vladimirescu carried out a protocol course for Gheorghe Gheorghiu-Dej and Nikita Khrushchev.

In 1963, the forward cabins below the main deck were replaced with a restaurant and bar. By this time, the ship offered rides for foreign tourists around the Danube Delta between May and September. In 1974, the costs of operating the old ship were deemed unprofitable, however, Navrom managed to save the ship from scrapping by offering her to the students of the Naval Institute in Galați in the winter and organizing trips along the Danube for wealthy tourists during summer. The same year, some enthusiasts from the company organized a festivity in honor of the 100th year of navigation for the passenger ship, offering the ship the medal "100 Years of Navigation 1874-1974". A bronze plaque to commemorate the event was also mounted at the entrance of the cabin from the starboard bow.

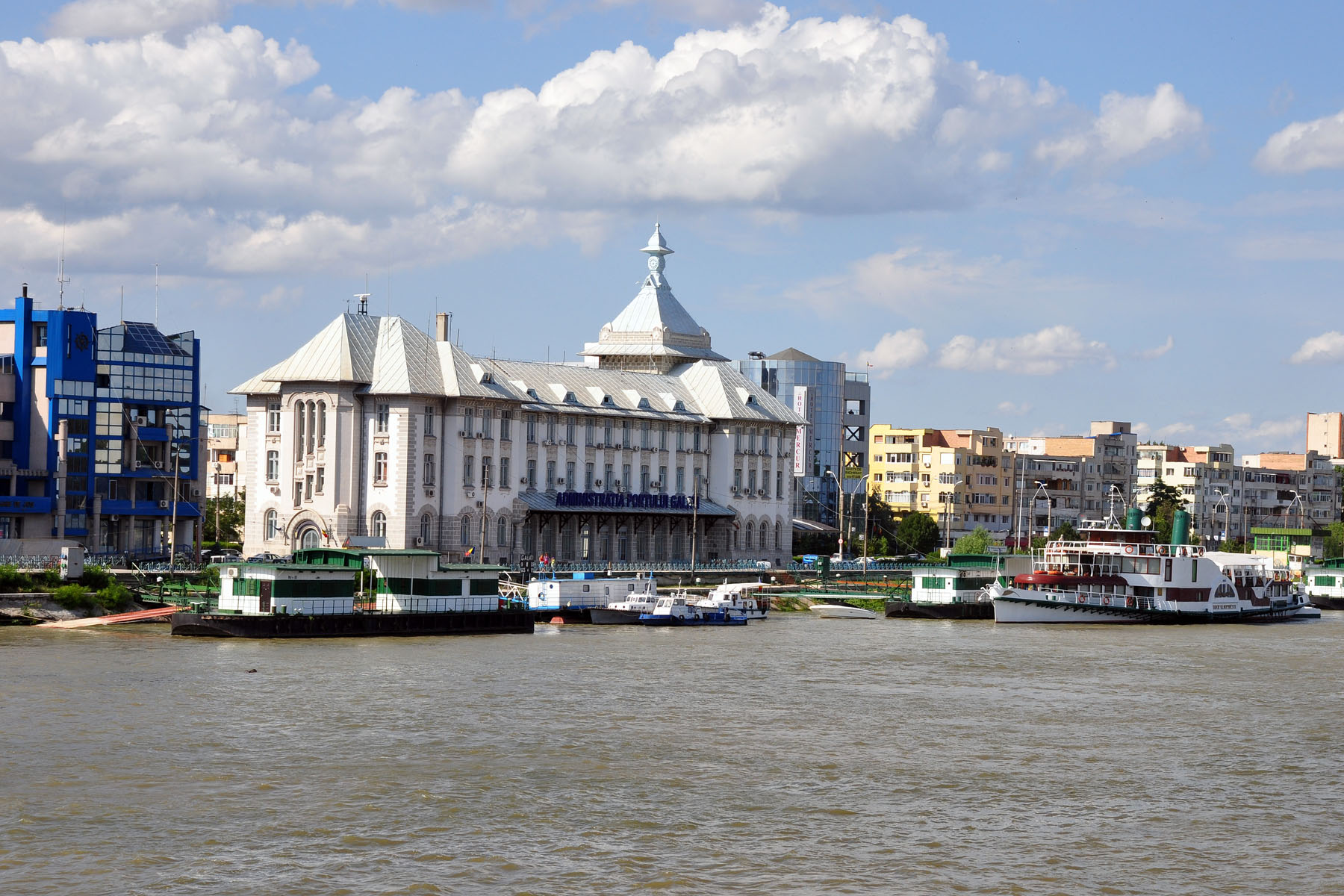
The ship (on the right) docked in front of the Galați Navigation Palace in 2009

Tudor Vladimirescu became a schoolship for the Industrial Marine High School of Galați in 1980, then began serving as the headquarters of Navrom Galați from 1981. Between 22 and 23 November 1983 negotiations regarding a navigation dispute with the Yugoslav Navigation Company of Belgrade were held aboard the ship. The ship was also placed at the disposal of the House of Pioneers of Orșova who organized visits on board the ship for school children in 1989. Between 1990 and 1992, Tudor Vladimirescu operated as a luxury floating restaurant named "Europolis" in Tulcea.

In 1993, some repair works were carried out at Severin, at the same time, the keel of the ship was also rebuilt. Between 2002 and 2003, the ship was modernized at Galați and Brăila. Initially, the Damen shipyard at Galați was to carry out the project, however, the ship ended up in the cold park near the Chiciu Ostrov where she was affected by the weather and rust. In November 2002, the ship was transferred to the Brăila shipyard, where the modernization works were continued. After a thorough review by specialists, the thin metal sheets were replaced and the damaged elements of the rudder and paddles were repaired. In a $1.5 million project, the piping was redone, the valves were replaced, the electrical, sanitary, and air conditioning installations were modernized, and new thermally and acoustically insulated superstructures were added. The oil fuel previously used was replaced with diesel to remove the polluting fumes. The original hull, paddle wheels, and engine were kept.

In 2004, Tudor Vladimirescu was reintroduced to the tourist circuit. Today, the ship offers her passengers two promenade decks with a capacity of 20 and 80 seats respectively, and two lounges with 30 seats in the bow and 70 seats in the stern. Both the promenade decks and the lounges are equipped with high-performance sound systems. Two apartments with double beds are located on the promenade level, while the main deck level has four rooms with double beds and a bathroom. The aft saloon houses the ship's bar and galley, linked to the lower deck by an elevator. On the lower bow deck, there are eight cabins with two bunk beds each, on the lower aft deck there are two cabins with four beds each, as well as the crew cabins. She is mostly docked in front of the Navigation Palace in Galați and is used primarily as a protocol ship for local and governmental level meetings and can be rented for luxury cruises.

== See also ==
- List of oldest surviving ships
- Skibladner, the second oldest paddle steamer and the oldest in timetabled service
