= PS Murray Princess =

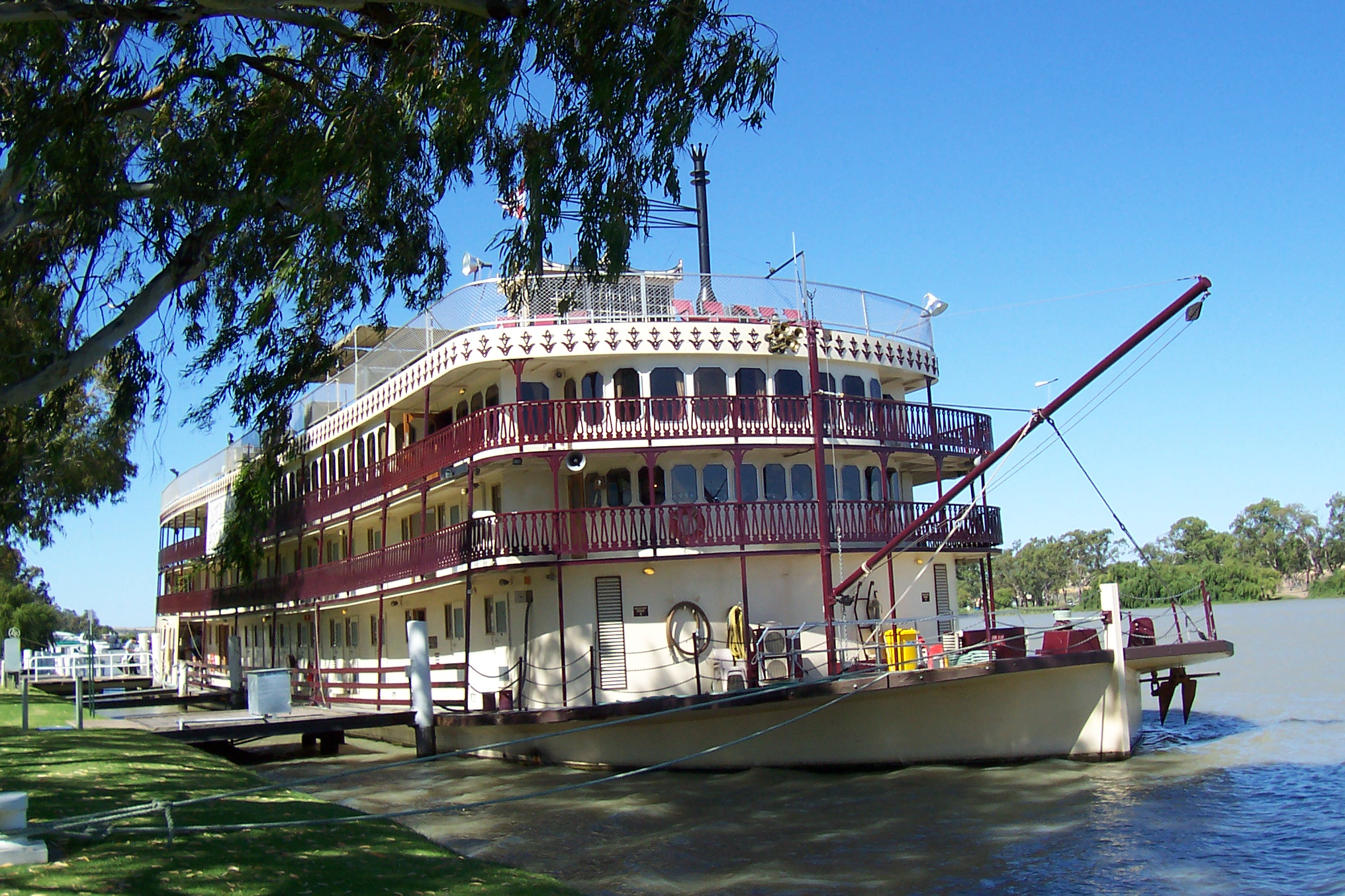
- PS Murray Princess at Mannum

History

Australia
- Name: PS Murray Princess
- Owner: Captain Cook Cruises
- Port of registry: Mannum, Australia
- Launched: June 1986
- Christened: 18 July 1986
- In service: August 1986
- Status: Operational

General characteristics
- Type: Passenger Ship
- Tonnage: 1506 tonnes
- Length: 67 metres
- Beam: 15 metres
- Draft: 1.2 metres
- Decks: 5
- Installed power: 2 x Scania DB 9 engines powering hydraulic pumps
- Propulsion: Hydraulic Stern Wheel - fitted with Caterpillar 3408 Bow & Stern Thrusters
- Speed: 6 knots
- Capacity: 120 passengers
- Crew: Varies on passenger numbers; Minimum Crewing 6

PS Murray Princess, is a tourist vessel operating from its homeport of Mannum, South Australia, on the Murray River. The regular cruising schedule offers a three night cruise departing each Friday, a four night cruise departing each Monday or a seven night combined cruise departing either Friday or Monday. The PS Murray Princess also offers cruises such as seven night one way voyages from Mannum to either Loxton or Renmark.

== History ==
PS Murray Princess was built in Goolwa. It was the largest paddle wheeler in Australia. It was initially operated by Murray River Developments.

== Vessel details ==
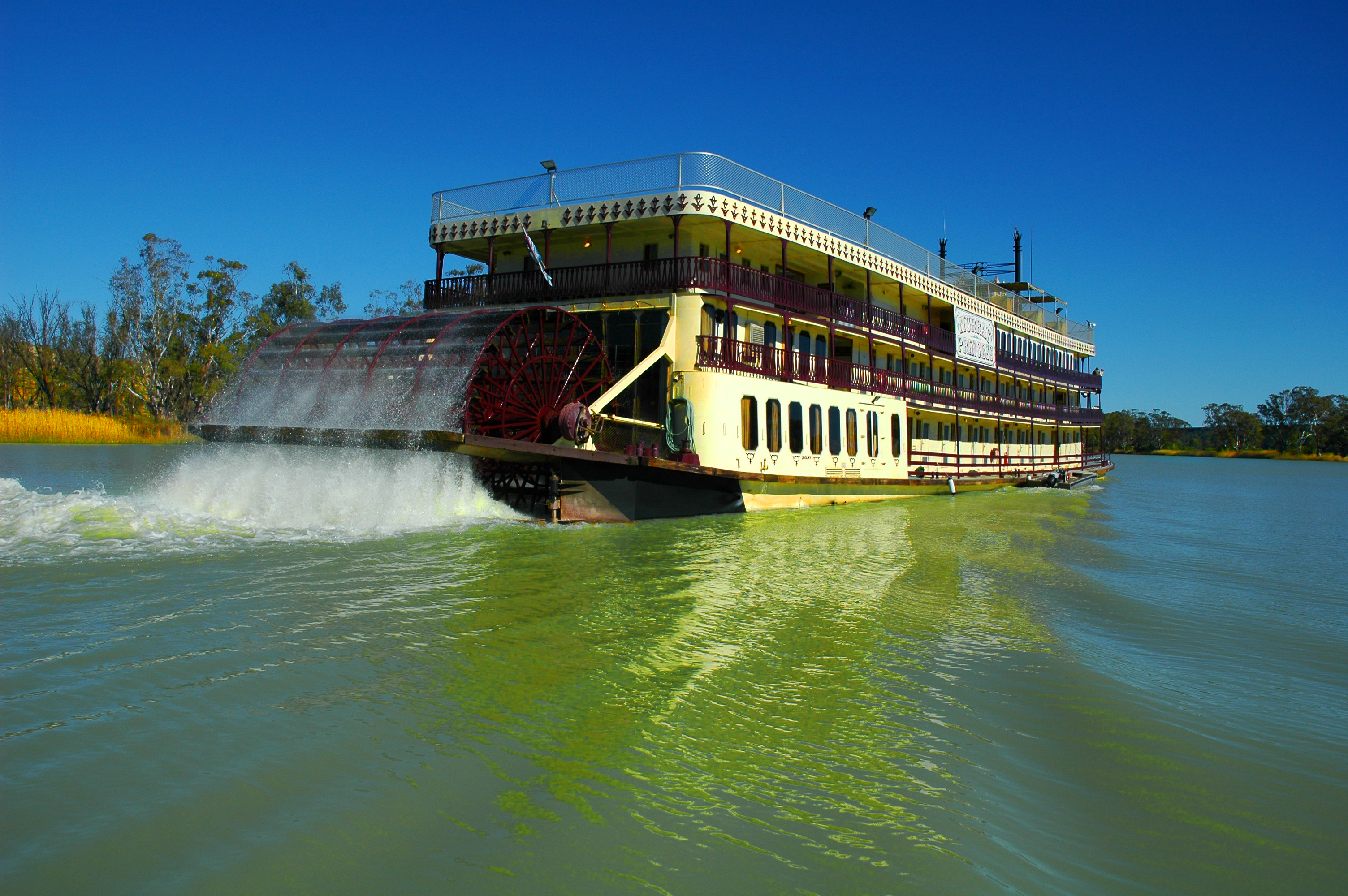
Paddlewheel located at the stern of the Murray Princes

The PS Murray Princess has 5 decks, 3 of which are passenger accommodation. The 4 main decks are named after important historical figures relevant the Murray River.

- Deck 1 - Chaffey Deck: Inside cabins with a porthole, spa/sauna/gym and laundry, located in the hull.
- Deck 2 - Randell Deck: Main boarding deck, consists of outside cabins, staterooms and the lower level of the PaddleWheel Lounge.
- Deck 3 - Cadell Deck: Outside cabins and staterooms, The Wheelhouse (Bridge) and the upper level of the PaddleWheel Lounge.
- Deck 4 - Sturt Deck: Sturt Deck Dining Room and Sturt Deck Bar.
- Deck 5 - Sun Deck: Exterior deck, outdoor seating and sun lounges.

The ship has sixty cabins onboard which include inside cabins, outside cabins, limited mobility cabins and staterooms. There are various public spaces on board to enjoy, such as the double story elegant PaddleWheel Lounge, which offers floor to ceiling windows looking out on the enormous paddlewheel. The Sturt Deck (4th Deck) is home to the Sturt Dining Room and Sturt Deck Bar - which has a warm and inviting feel. For the sunny days, passengers can use the Sun Deck to watch the scenery pass by. There is also a spa, sauna and gym available.

She is the latest in a line of such vessels that date back to the late 19th Century, including the 1897-built steamer, PS Marion, and more recent vessels Murray River Queen, Murray Explorer and Coonawarra.

At a little over 67m in length and weighing just over 1,500 tonnes, she is the largest paddlewheeler ever to operate on the Murray and the largest paddle wheeler in the Southern Hemisphere.
