= Ellen Mary Knox =

Canadian educator and school administrator

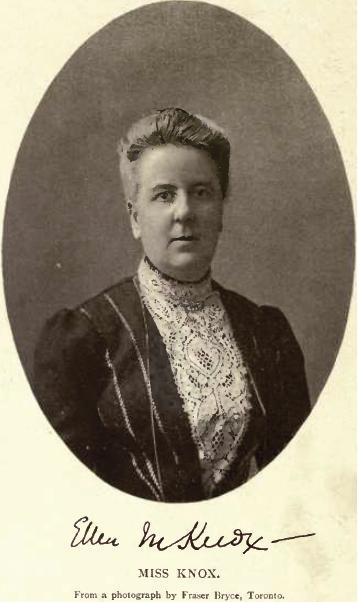
Miss Ellen Mary Knox by Fraser Bryce, Toronto.

Ellen Mary Knox (October 4, 1858 — January 24, 1924) was an English-born Canadian educator and school administrator, the first principal of Havergal College in Toronto.

== Early life ==
Ellen Mary Knox was born in Waddon, Surrey, England, the daughter of the Rev. George Knox and Frances Mary Ann, daughter of Thomas Forbes Reynolds, M.D. and a descendant of John Arbuthnott, 8th Viscount of Arbuthnott. Her father was an Anglican clergyman in India. She was the sister of Edmund Arbuthnott Knox. She studied at Cheltenham Ladies' College and Oxford University.

== Career ==
Knox taught briefly at Cheltenham Ladies' College. In 1894, she became first principal of Havergal College, an Anglican girls' school, when it opened in Toronto. She served in that position for thirty years, until her death in 1924. "The success of the school during its first thirty years was largely the result of her drive and personality," concluded a biographer of her colleague, Henry John Cody.

Published works by Ellen Mary Knox include Acts of the Apostles: Bible Lessons for School Children (1908), Canadian Education and the War, The Girl of the New Day (1919), about the role of young women in Canada after World War I, and A Girl's Week of Prayer (1920).

== Personal life ==
Knox's notable kin included her brother's children, editor E. V. Knox, author Winifred Peck, codebreaker Dilly Knox, Anglican clergyman Wilfred Knox, and Roman Catholic priest Ronald Knox. Ellen Mary Knox died in 1924, aged 65 years.
