= John Arbuthnot (disambiguation) =

John Arbuthnot (1667–1735) was physician to Queen Anne of the United Kingdom.

John Arbuthnot or John Arbuthnott may also refer to:

== Viscounts ==
- John Arbuthnott, 5th Viscount of Arbuthnott (1692–1756)
- John Arbuthnott, 6th Viscount of Arbuthnott (1703–1791)
- John Arbuthnott, 7th Viscount of Arbuthnott (1754–1800)
- John Arbuthnott, 8th Viscount of Arbuthnott (1778–1860), Scottish peer and soldier
- John Arbuthnott, 9th Viscount of Arbuthnott (1806–1891), Scottish peer and soldier
- John Arbuthnott, 10th Viscount of Arbuthnott (1843–1895)
- John Arbuthnott, 14th Viscount of Arbuthnott (1882–1960)
- John Arbuthnott, 16th Viscount of Arbuthnott (1924–2012), Scottish peer and businessman

== Others ==
- John Arbuthnot (agriculturist) (c. 1729–1797), Inspector General of the Irish Linen Board
- John Arbuthnot (Canadian politician) (1861–1931), mayor of Winnipeg
- John Bernard Arbuthnot (1875–1950), British soldier and author for the Daily Express
- Sir John Arbuthnot, 1st Baronet (1912–1992), British Member of Parliament
- Sir John Arbuthnott (microbiologist) (1939–2023), Scottish microbiologist
- John A. Arbuthnot (1802–1875), British banker
