= Edmund Knox (bishop of Manchester) =

British Anglican bishop (1847-1937)

The Right Reverend Edmund Knox
- Bishop of Manchester
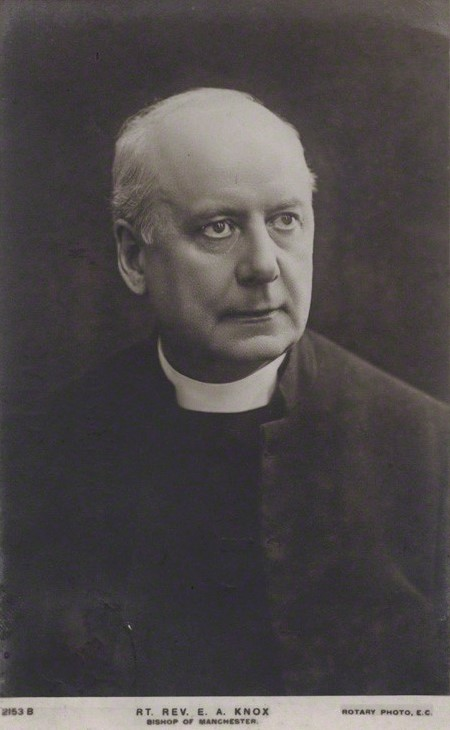
- Church: Church of England
- In office: 1903 to 1921
- Predecessor: James Moorhouse
- Successor: William Temple
- Other post: Bishop of Coventry (1894–1903)

Orders
- Ordination: 1872

Personal details
- Born: 6 December 1847
- Died: 16 January 1937 (aged 89)
- Denomination: Anglicanism
- Children: six
- Education: St Paul's School, London
- Alma mater: Corpus Christi College, Oxford

Edmund Arbuthnott Knox (6 December 1847 – 16 January 1937) was the fourth Bishop of Manchester, from 1903 to 1921. He was described as a prominent evangelical.

== Biography ==
Born in Bangalore, the second son of the Reverend George Knox and Frances Mary Anne (daughter of Thomas Forbes Reynolds, M.D. and a sister of the daughter-in-law of John Arbuthnott, 8th Viscount of Arbuthnott) and educated at St Paul's and Corpus Christi College, Oxford, he was ordained in 1872 and began his ecclesiastical career with a period as Fellow, Tutor, and Dean of Merton College, Oxford. He was also rector of St Wilfrid's Church in Kibworth from 1884 to 1891, then from 1891 vicar of Aston by Birmingham, and from 1894 to 1903 rector of St Philip's, Birmingham, Suffragan Bishop of Coventry and Archdeacon of Birmingham.

Knox was the author of a distinguished history of the Oxford Movement written from an unsympathetic evangelical viewpoint.

Knox was an early proponent of cremation. In a letter read at the 1903 opening ceremony of the Birmingham Crematorium, he wrote:

in spite of strong sentimental objections very naturally entertained, we shall come to see that under the conditions of modern life cremation is not only preferable from the sanitary point of view, but that it is also the most reverent and decent treatment of the bodies of the dead.

During the First World War, Knox was an early proponent of conscription rather than relying on volunteers to serve in the forces and elsewhere. He believed that the Government should have legislated for ‘The whole resources of the country in men and means’ being placed ‘unreservedly at the disposal of the country’. He was one of the few bishops who supported the desire of many younger clergy to serve as combatants which the Bench of Bishops had voted overwhelmingly against. ‘My heart is with those clergy who wish to show that they are ready to share the same hardships and dangers as the rest of their parishioners’.

Knox died on 16 January 1937. On 27 January 1937, a memorial service was held at All Souls Church, Langham Place. H. Earnshaw Smith, then Rector of All Souls, officiated the service, Sidney Nowell Rostron read the lesson and T. W. Gilbert gave the address. He was then laid to rest in what is now Beckenham Cemetery.

== Family ==
Bishop Knox was married twice. First he married Ellen Penelope French (1854–1892) in 1878, daughter of Thomas Valpy French, Bishop of Lahore. Second, he married Ethel Mary Newton in 1895, daughter of Canon Horace Newton of Holmwood, Redditch and Glencripesdale Estate Argyllshire.

He was father of six children by his first wife Ellen French:

- Ethel Knox (1879–1958)
- Edmund George Valpy Knox (1881–1971), satirist who was editor of Punch
- Winifred Frances Knox (1882–1961), married James Peck and became known as an author under the name "Winifred Peck"
- Alfred Dillwyn Knox (1884–1943), known as "Dilly", a classical scholar, and a codebreaker in both World Wars
- Wilfred Lawrence Knox (1886–1950), Anglican priest
- Ronald Arbuthnott Knox (1888–1957), former Anglican priest who became a Roman Catholic priest and translator of the Bible.

His sister was Ellen Mary Knox, the first principal of Havergal College in Toronto, Canada. Another brother became a judge in the Allahabad High Court, later Sir George Edward Knox (1845 — 1922).

Church of England titles
Preceded by Henry Bowlby	Bishop of Coventry; 1894–1903	Vacant Suffragan title ended Title next held by Huyshe Yeatman-Biggs as diocesan bishop
Preceded by James Moorhouse	Bishop of Manchester; 1903–1921	Succeeded by William Temple
