= Frieda Fraser =

Canadian physician (1899–1994)

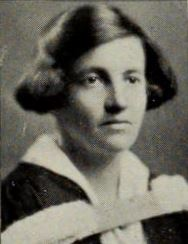
- Fraser in 1925
- Born: Ethel Frida Fraser; 30 August 1899; York, Toronto, Canada
- Died: 29 July 1994 (aged 94); Burlington, Ontario, Canada
- Other names: Frieda Helen Fraser; Helen Frieda Fraser
- Occupations: Physician; scientist; academic
- Years active: 1925–1965
- Known for: Research on infectious diseases
- Notable work: Archive of letters with her partner Edith Williams

Frieda Fraser (30 August 1899 – 29 July 1994) was a Canadian physician, scientist and academic who worked in infectious disease, including research on scarlet fever and tuberculosis. After finishing her medical studies at the University of Toronto in 1925, she completed a two-year internship in the United States, studying and working in Manhattan and Philadelphia. Afterward, she conducted research in the Connaught Laboratories in Toronto concentrating on infectious disease, making important contributions in the pre-penicillin age to isolation of the strains of streptococci likely to lead to disease. From 1928, she lectured in the Department of Hygiene at the University of Toronto on preventive medicine, working her way up from a teaching assistant to a full professor by 1955. In college, around 1917 Fraser met her life partner, Edith Williams, and though their families tried to keep them apart, their relationship spanned until Edith's death in 1979. The correspondence between the two has been preserved and is an important legacy for the lesbian history of Canada.

== Early life ==
Ethel Frida Fraser's birth was recorded on 30 August 1899 in York, Toronto, Ontario, Canada, to Helene (née Zahn) and William Henry Fraser. It is unknown when her name began being styled as Frieda Helen Fraser. Her father was a native Ontarian who had graduated from the University of Toronto (U of T) and taught at the Upper Canada College before being appointed as a lecturer in Italian and Spanish at U of T. He prolifically wrote textbooks which were used in the provincial schools for many years. Her mother was a native of Germany and the couple's children, William Kaspar, Donald and Frieda were fluent in German and French. Fraser was home schooled until 1914, when she enrolled in Havergal College. Soon thereafter, in 1916, her father died and her brother Donald became an encouraging influence for her. In 1917, Fraser entered University College to study physics and biology. During her college years, she joined the Kappa Alpha Theta sorority where she met Edith Williams. She completed her undergraduate degree in 1922 and enrolled in medical school, earning her Bachelor of Medicine in 1925. Hers was the first class that required students to complete six years of study and had quotas limiting the number of women who could attend. Because few hospitals would accept women doctors for internships, Fraser went to the United States in the summer of 1925 to begin her internship at the New York Infirmary for Women and Children.

== Internship abroad ==
Fraser began her work in gynaecology and obstetrics in 1924, noting that the only internships available to her were in OBGYN or children's tonsillectomies. Much of her work required her to visit immigrant patients of the tenement houses of the Lower East Side. She had little understanding of the diverse ethnicities of her patients, their poverty and the conditions in which they lived. Fraser had been influenced by Eugenics studies, which caused her medical practices to be influenced by ethnic origin. She became convinced that there was inadequate information available about birth control available to both physicians and patients and she sought information from non-medical sources, becoming an advocate. Soon after her arrival in New York, Fraser began a more intense correspondence with Williams, who would become her life partner. (Note: Perdue makes reference to the fact that Fraser and Williams had corresponded since the early days of their relationship, but that letters from between 1917 and 1924 were not saved. As the relationship became more important to them, the letters were retained. They were both committed to preserving the correspondence, even at points writing about having the letters bound to take up less storage space.) Despite the desires of both women's families to keep them apart—Williams' family sending her to England and Fraser's family threatening that continuing the relationship would fracture her familial ties—the two refused to give up their relationship.

Fraser's experiences as an intern convinced her that she would prefer medical research to actual practice with patients. When she completed her New York internship in 1926, she moved to Philadelphia, after a brief visit home to Toronto to visit her mother and her brother Donald. In Pennsylvania, Fraser began her post-doctorate training under the direction of Muriel McPhedran at the Phipps Institute for the Study, Treatment and Prevention of Tuberculosis in January 1927, specialising in bacteriology The experiences in her internships were markedly different in that in New York, she lived at the hospital and the staff was predominantly made up of women. In Philadelphia, she lived in her own apartment in the town and often had to struggle to be accepted as a doctor and be able to see patients. In March 1927, Fraser was offered a position in the Connaught Laboratories, a research facility dedicated to developing vaccines, where her brother worked. Accepting the position to begin at the end of her internship in October meant that she would not be joining Williams in England. Williams had hoped that Fraser would join her, where they might be able to live together, but recognized with the choice of going back to Toronto, that would not be possible.

== Return to Canada ==
In 1928, Fraser returned to Toronto and took up her research post, simultaneously working as a demonstrator with the Department of Hygiene and Preventative Medicine. She was one of the founding faculty of the School of Hygiene at U of T. She made her home with her brother Donald; Williams, who had also returned from England, moved in with her own mother. Though the two women wanted to live together, raise children and continue their careers, they were unwilling to displease or fail in their obligations to their mothers. They also realized that though they were middle-class, working women, economic inequalities in their pay compromised their ability to support themselves and their need to remain in the good graces of their families for support. When Williams was bequeathed a farm near Aurora, Ontario, the couple believed it might become their haven, but when Williams applied for courses at the Ontario School of Agriculture, she was advised the courses were full. For the next several years, they lived apart but within a 30-minute walk from each other at various residences.

By 1931, Fraser had successfully passed her medical examinations and become licensed. Two years later, Fraser became a part-time lecturer and then in 1934 was promoted to full-time lecturer in the department. Around the same time, in 1933, Williams moved to the farm full-time, returning to Toronto only on weekends. In 1937, she was finally accepted into the Ontario Veterinary College and that same year, Fraser's mother died. Williams graduated in 1941 and she began practicing as a veterinarian. For the first time, the two women acquired a home together, living in Toronto. They took in a foster child, Jenny Rodd, a war refugee from England, who remained with them until the war ended. Rising homophobia during the war-years, which carried into the 1950s and 1960s led the couple to hide the intimate nature of their relationship from their ward and present an ambiguous relationship to the greater society, limiting their social life to those who knew them best.

== Career ==
In her research, Fraser worked predominantly in infectious disease, studying general infection, puerperal fever, scarlet fever and septic sore throat among other bacterial infections. She began studies on scarlet fever in the early 1930s, and along with Dr. Helen Plummer isolated the precipitin present in the strains of streptococci likely to lead to disease. These findings were important in determining the types of antitoxins which might be employed for immunization to neutralize the disease. The type of research Fraser was engaged in required that the bacteria of the disease which created a toxin be isolated, so that it could be injected into a horse. Repeated injections of small doses of toxin allowed the horse to become immune to the disease. The serum created from the blood of animals which had been immunized, contained an antibody (known at the time as an antitoxin), which could then be injected into humans to cure the disease. Development of the sulfonamides rendered immunization against scarlet fever unnecessary, but she continued to study other aspects of the disease. In 1941, she typed the streptococci of scarlet fever which was an important breakthrough for tracking the epidemiology of the disease. Fraser also conducted research in an attempt to develop an antigen for tuberculosis. With the development of penicillin, her research after 1947, shifted focus to the study of antibiotics including bacitracin, penicillin, polymixin, and subtilin. Fraser studied various preparations of penicillin against the tubercular bacillus and as a treatment for gonorrhoea. Rising through the ranks of assistant professor and associate professor, Fraser became a full professor in 1949 teaching preventative medicine for the Bachelor of Science or nursing degree for the remainder of her career. In 1955 Fraser was appointed as a professor of microbiology and held that post until her retirement a decade later.

== Later career and retirement ==
In 1959, the couple purchased a house together located on Burlington Crescent in Toronto, near Edith's clinic and lived there until their retirement. In 1965, both women retired and sold their Toronto home, moving to the farm house owned by the Fraser family in Burlington, Ontario. The farm was located in a very scenic setting on the Niagara Escarpment, near the Bruce Trail. Fraser, who enjoyed gardening, tended the ground and Williams, who was a fine cook, enjoyed cooking for their frequent guests. Having become interested in mountaineering, Williams enjoyed mountain-climbing and both women enjoyed taking excursions which allowed them to be outdoors. In their archives are many photographs taken with groups of women on camping and canoe trips. Williams suffered a severe stroke near the end of 1976 and never fully recovered from it, requiring repeated hospitalizations at Queen Elizabeth Hospital. Fraser drove in daily from Burlington to visit Williams. She died in 1979, after a series of additional strokes and Fraser returned to the home in Burlington where she remained until three weeks before her death, when her family placed her in a nursing home.

== Personal life ==
Fraser died on 29 July 1994 in a nursing home in Burlington, Ontario. During her lifetime, Fraser became a benefactor to Canadian artist Frances M. Gage, agreeing to finance Gage for two years of her education at the Art Students League of New York. Gage had worked in Williams' veterinary clinic and her potential sculptural talent came recommended through mutual friends Frances Loring and Florence Wyle.

Her family donated the couple's papers to the University of Toronto archives. The correspondence covers the period from 1925 to 1941, the period when the couple were unable to live together. Until 2001, the collection was a closed archive and could only be accessed with family permission. The archive contains nearly one thousand letters and is "one of the largest known collections detailing the experiences of women's same-sex sexuality in early twentieth century North America". The two women did not refer to themselves as lesbian, though they were familiar with the term. Given the cultural norm of their time which depicted same-sex couples as diseased, they referred to themselves as "devoted women", making the distinction that they were not depraved, but had chosen their partnership. They used their letters to create and define their relationship and frankly discuss not only other same-sex partnerships, but to evaluate what they believed about their attraction. Both dismissed Freud and pseudo-scientific theories which argued that all women had a heterosexual drive and that there was a natural order requiring women to be coupled only to men instead believing that their attraction was biological and innate, and not influenced by promiscuous living or self-loathing. The collection of letters is an important archive for the historical study of how sexual identity is developed and acknowledged within the contemporary context of an epoch and is a unique collection in that most such archives have not survived.
