= Alec Vidler =

English Anglican theologian and priest (1899–1991)

The Reverend Alec Vidler OGS
- Born: Alexander Roper Vidler; 27 December 1899; Rye, Sussex, England
- Died: 25 July 1991 (aged 91)

Ecclesiastical career
- Religion: Christianity (Anglican)
- Church: Church of England
- Ordained: 1922

Academic background
- Education: Selwyn College, Cambridge
- Influences: D. R. Davies; Alfred Loisy; F. D. Maurice; Reinhold Niebuhr; Paul Tillich

Academic work
- Discipline: History; theology
- Sub-discipline: Ecclesiastical history
- School or tradition: Anglo-Catholicism
- Institutions: King's College, Cambridge
- Doctoral students: David Nicholls
- Influenced: Christopher Evans

Alexander Roper Vidler OGS (27 December 1899 – 25 July 1991), known as Alec Vidler, was an English Anglican priest, theologian, and ecclesiastical historian, who served as Dean of King's College, Cambridge, for ten years from 1956 and then, following his retirement in 1966, as Mayor of Rye, Sussex.

== Biography ==
Vidler was born on 27 December 1899 in Rye, Sussex, the son of shipowner and amateur local historian (author of A New History of Rye, published in 1934, and The Story of the Rye Volunteers, published in 1954) Leopold Amon Vidler of The Stone House, Rye, and his wife Edith Hamilton, daughter of Edward Roper. The shipowning Vidler family had a long association with Rye, with Alec's great-grandfather, John Vidler, vice-consul for France, Sweden, Norway, and the Hanse Towns, being an alderman of the town, and his descendants serving as mayors, aldermen and councillors. Thus, Alec Vidler's father, grandfather and great-grandfather served as Mayor of Rye. The founder of Ascham St Vincent's School, at Eastbourne, Sussex, William Newcombe Willis, was his father's first cousin by marriage.

Vidler attended Sutton Valence School. During the First World War he worked in a family business, and served briefly in the British Army. He was then an undergraduate at Selwyn College, Cambridge, and attended Wells Theological College and the Oratory House, Cambridge.

Following his ordination in 1922, he was a curate in a poor parish in Newcastle-upon-Tyne. He was then a curate and acting parish priest in Birmingham; he was one of the Anglo-Catholic clergy setting up a confrontation with the bishop, Ernest William Barnes, centred on the parish of Small Heath.

In 1938 Vidler became editor of Theology and librarian at Hawarden. There he was promoted to Warden of St Deiniol's Library, and encouraged Gordon Dunstan who was in a junior position, before becoming Canon of St George's Chapel, Windsor. He had been appointed an honorary canon of Derby Cathedral in 1946. During the Second World War he was one of the regular participants in J. H. Oldham's discussion group, "The Moot". In 1946 he published with Walter Alexander Whitehouse Natural Law: A Christian Re-Consideration based on ecumenical meetings at St Deiniol's Library including Hans Ehrenberg, Hubert Cunliffe-Jones, Richard Kelwe, Gerhard Leibholz, Philip Mairet, Richard O'Sullivan, and Victor White.

He wrote regularly for the Church Times before it associated him with radicalism.

Later he taught at the University of Cambridge, where in 1956 he succeeded Ivor Ramsay as Dean of King's College, later supervising the doctorate of David Nicholls. In 1964 he resigned his post at Theology; he was the longest-serving editor in the journal's history. He retired in 1966 to his house in Rye, where he wrote his autobiography and served as Mayor of Rye, as had his father, grandfather, and great-grandfather.

He died on 25 July 1991.

== Influence ==
He was a lifelong friend of Malcolm Muggeridge, whom he met as an undergraduate at Selwyn. Through Vidler's influence Muggeridge lived at the Oratory House in Cambridge in his last student year; Muggeridge later described Vidler as one of three most important people in his life. At the Oratory House in Cambridge in 1933 he encountered Wilfred Knox, then the only other inhabitant. Penelope Fitzgerald, who calls Vidler "this great priest, theologian, and natural administrator and organiser, whose horizon widened year by year", describes how Vidler brought the retiring Knox into circulation in the university.

He was the editor of Theology until the 1950s and the author of several books that received wide attention. He also edited, with Philip Mairet, Frontier (journal of the ecumenical Christian Frontier Group), until 1953.

During the 1950s Vidler began to advocate the abolition of the clerical collar in favour of a black shirt and white tie, but whilst some clergy adopted this mode of dress it did not become widespread.

== Published works ==
- Magic and Religion (1930)
- Sex, Marriage and Religion (1932)
- A Plain Man's Guide to Christianity: Essays in Liberal Catholicism (1936)
- The Modernist Movement in the Roman Church: Its Origins and Outcome (Cambridge: Cambridge University Press, 1934)
- God's Judgement on Europe (1940)
- Secular Despair and Christian Faith (1941)
- Christ's Strange Work (1944)
- The Orb and the Cross (1945)
- The Theology of F. D. Maurice (1948)
- Prophecy and Papacy: A Study of Lamennais, the Church, and the Revolution (London: SCM Press Ltd, 1954)
- Essays in Liberality (1957)
- Windsor Sermons (London: SCM Press, 1958)
- The Church in an Age of Revolution: 1789 to the Present Day (The Pelican History of the Church, Vol. 5, 1961)
- Soundings: Essays Concerning Christian Understanding (editor) (Cambridge University Press, 1962); Vidler's chapter is entitled "Religion and the National Church."
- Objections to Christian Belief (Penguin Books, 1963) with contributions by four Cambridge deans—James Stanley Bezzant of St. John's College, Alec Vidler of King's College, H. A. Williams of Trinity College, and Donald MacKinnon
- A Century of Social Catholicism (1964)
- 20th Century Defenders of the Faith (1965)
- A Variety of Catholic Modernists (Cambridge University Press, 1970)
- Paul, Envoy Extraordinary (co-authored with Malcolm Muggeridge) (New York: Harper & Row, 1972)
- Scenes from a Clerical Life (1977) His autobiography.

Academic offices
Preceded by Ivor Ramsay	Dean of King's College, Cambridge; 1956–1966	Succeeded by David Edwards
