= Wilfred Knox =

English Anglican priest and theologian (1886–1950)

The Reverend Wilfred Knox OGS FSA FBA
- Knox at the Oratory of the Good Shepherd, Cambridge
- Born: 21 May 1886; Kibworth Beauchamp, England
- Died: 9 February 1950 (aged 63); Cambridge, England
- Parents: Edmund Knox; Ellen Knox
- Relatives: E. V. Knox (brother); Dilly Knox (brother); Ronald Knox (brother); Winifred Peck (sister); Penelope Fitzgerald (niece)

Ecclesiastical career
- Religion: Christianity (Anglican)
- Church: Church of England
- Ordained: 1914 (deacon); 1915 (priest)

Academic background
- Education: Trinity College, Oxford; Pembroke College, Cambridge
- Influences: George Lansbury; F. D. Maurice; John Ruskin; William Temple

Academic work
- Discipline: Theology
- School or tradition: Anglo-Catholicism
- Institutions: Pembroke College, Cambridge

Wilfred Lawrence Knox OGS FSA FBA (21 May 1886 – 9 February 1950) was an English Anglican priest and theologian, one of four brothers who distinguished themselves. After leaving Oxford with a first-class honours degree in classics, Knox soon began working with the poor of London's East End, and then studied for the priesthood. After brief parish work, he was warden of the Oratory of the Good Shepherd from 1924 to 1940, and chaplain and fellow of Pembroke College, Cambridge. He approached his New Testament studies as a Hellenist, and wrote several books on Paul the Apostle and other aspects of ecclesiastical history from that angle. He also wrote books explaining Anglo-Catholicism and the Christian way of life.

== Life and career ==
=== Early years ===
Knox was born 21 May 1886 at Kibworth Beauchamp, Leicestershire, a village in the English Midlands. He was the third son and fourth of the six children of Edmund Knox, the rector of Kibworth, and his first wife, Ellen Penelope, née French. The other sons were Edmund, Dillwyn and Ronald; his sisters were Ethel Knox and Winifred Peck. Edmund became editor of Punch, Dillwyn, after a scholastic career, was a key figure among Second World War code-breakers at Bletchley Park, and Ronald became a prominent Roman Catholic priest, writer, and translator of the Bible. Their father was a descendant of John Arbuthnott, 8th Viscount of Arbuthnott.

The rector was ill at ease with the comfortable way of life of Kibworth, feeling he could do more good in a deprived area. In 1891, when Wilfred was five, the family moved to the parish of Aston-juxta-Birmingham, a poor area of Birmingham. In 1892 Ellen Knox died. Wilfred and his younger brother were sent to live with their bachelor uncle, his formidable widowed mother and his sisters. Two years later Edmund Sr became suffragan Bishop of Coventry, remarried, and reunited his six children. He was persuaded that the boys should attend public schools. All four boys won scholarships to Rugby (Edmund Jr and Wilfred) or Eton (Dillwyn and Ronald).

Wilfred's early concern for poverty was reinforced at Aston. At Rugby he came under the influence of an older pupil, William Temple, later Archbishop of Canterbury, whose creed combined Christianity and socialism. (Note: Among Temple's posts in his priesthood was Bishop of Manchester, succeeding Bishop Knox on the latter's retirement in 1921.) As well as Temple's views, Knox was impressed by the writings of John Ruskin and F. D. Maurice, all tending in the direction of socialism and the alleviation or abolition of poverty.

From Rugby, Knox won a scholarship to Trinity College, Oxford. He suffered a crisis in his religious faith while there, and threw himself into study. He was placed in the first class in classical moderations (1907) and in literae humaniores (1909). On coming down from Oxford he obtained a civil service post as a junior examiner at the Board of Education. His Christian faith no longer in doubt, he moved away from his father's evangelicalism towards Anglo-Catholicism. (Note: Knox disapproved of the term Anglo-Catholics, preferring "'English Catholics' to show that we were still divided from the rest of Europe, but shouldn't be".) Bishop Knox was distressed by his son's doctrinal views, but in full support of his work among the poor in the East End of London. During the Oxford vacations, and later while working as a civil servant, Knox lived at the Trinity Mission in Stratford, of which he later became warden for a short period. His mentors and role models were Temple and George Lansbury, the latter a future leader of the Labour Party, who was a prominent figure in the East End. Through Lansbury's influence Knox became involved with the Workers' Educational Association, of which Temple was president.

=== Ministry ===
In 1913 Knox resigned from the civil service. He studied theology at St Anselm's College, Cambridge, and was ordained deacon in 1914, and priest the following year, serving as assistant curate at St Mary's, Graham Street, London. He privately made vows of poverty and celibacy. On the outbreak of the First World War, he volunteered to serve as an army chaplain, but was turned down by the War Office, which was suspicious of Anglo-Catholics.

In 1920 Knox moved to Cambridge as a member of the Oratory of the Good Shepherd until 1922. He then spent two years in parish work at St Saviour's, Hoxton, in east London as assistant priest. In 1924 he left London and returned to Cambridge to become Warden of the Oratory of the Good Shepherd. While holding the wardenship he became a member of Pembroke College, Cambridge, where he received the degrees of Bachelor of Divinity (1937) and Doctor of Divinity (1943). In 1941 he was appointed chaplain to the college, and in 1946 was elected a fellow.

In the Dictionary of National Biography, Bishop Edward Wynn divided Knox's published works into three categories. First, publications that were essentially explanatory, putting the case for the Anglican school of Liberal Catholicism. Knox's younger brother Ronald, having left the Church of England and joined the Roman Catholic Church, was an influential priest and writer. Wilfred, according to Natalie Watson in the Oxford Dictionary of National Biography "became an outspoken representative of the Anglo-Catholic movement. ... [In] popular and theological apologetics, he outlined the differences between Anglo-Catholicism and Roman Catholicism" in such books as The Catholic Movement in the Church of England (1923) and (with Alec Vidler) in The Development of Modern Catholicism (1933). Secondly, there were books of guidance on how to follow the Christian way of life. The best known of these was Meditation and Mental Prayer (1927), which gave "simple and direct teaching on prayer, penitence, and the love of God". Thirdly, Wynn identifies works of pure scholarship. Knox approached biblical studies from the standpoint of a classical scholar. He examined how Greek culture influenced not only the language but also the thinking of the writers of the New Testament. He frequently contributed to The Journal of Theological Studies. His books on the Hellenic aspect of Christian history include St Paul and the Church of Jerusalem (1925), St Paul and the Church of the Gentiles (1939) and Some Hellenistic Elements in Primitive Christianity (1944 – based on his Schweich lectures of 1942). His last book, The Sources of the Synoptic Gospels was nearly complete when he died. The manuscript was edited by Henry Chadwick and published posthumously in two volumes (1953 and 1957).

Knox died 9 February 1950 in Cambridge at the age of 63. So many wanted to attend his memorial service in Pembroke chapel that there had to be a ballot for tickets. Canon Henry R. T. Brandreth said of him, "There has never been anyone like Father Wilfred and it is impossible to believe that there ever will be. ... He sacrificed his own interests and inclinations on [the Oratory's] behalf with a wonderful steadfastness."

== Books ==
- The Catholic Movement in the Church of England, 1923
- St Paul and the Church of Jerusalem, 1925
- Meditation and Mental Prayer, 1927
- The Church in Crisis, 1928
- (with Eric Milner-White) One God and Father of All, 1929
- Life of St Paul, 1932
- (with Alec Vidler) The Development of Modern Catholicism, 1933
- (with Vidler) The Gospel of God and the Authority of the Church, 1937
- St Paul and the Church of the Gentiles, 1939
- Some Hellenistic Elements in Primitive Christianity (The Schweich Lectures 1942), 1944
- The Acts of the Apostles 1948
- (ed. Henry Chadwick) The Sources of the Synoptic Gospels (two volumes, 1953 and 1957)
