= Frances Gage =

Frances Gage may refer to:

- Frances M. Gage (1924–2017), Canadian sculptor
- Frances Dana Barker Gage (1808–1884), American reformer, feminist and abolitionist
