= Hugh Fraser, 7th Lord Lovat =

Feudal Lord

Hugh Fraser, 7th Lord Lovat (1591-1645) was a Scottish landowner.

Hugh Fraser was the son of Simon Fraser, 6th Lord Lovat and Katherine Mackenzie, daughter of Colin Mackenzie of Kintail.

He was known as the Master of Lovat until he succeeded his father in 1633. He was educated at the University of St Andrews.

In the autumn of 1634 a man cutting withies in the orchard of Lovat found an earthenware pot filled with gold coins and rings apparently from the sixteenth century. It was thought the treasure was brought to Lovat by Elizabeth Stewart, the bride of Hugh Fraser, 5th Lord Lovat, and had been stolen and hidden by her maid.

He died at Lovat on 17 December 1645.

== Marriage and family ==
Hugh Fraser married Isobel Wemyss (1588-1636), daughter of Sir John Wemyss in 1614 at Wemyss. Their children included:

- Mary Fraser, who married David Ross of Balnagown in 1634.
- Anne Fraser, who married John Gordon, 14th Earl of Sutherland
- Simon Fraser, Master of Lovat (1621-1639)
- Catherine Fraser, who married (1) Sir John Sinclair of Dunbeath, and (2) on 30 June 1653 Robert Arbuthnot, 1st Viscount of Arbuthnott
- Hugh Fraser, Master of Lovat, who married Anne Leslie daughter of Alexander Leslie, 1st Earl of Leven in 1642 at Holyrood House, and was the father of Hugh Fraser, 8th Lord Lovat
- Alexander Fraser
- Thomas Fraser, 10th Lord Lovat

Peerage of Scotland
| Preceded by Simon Fraser | Lord Lovat; 1577–1633 | Succeeded by Hugh Fraser |
