= Lincoln Theological College =

Seminary in Lincoln, England

Coordinates: 53.2336°N 0.5397°W

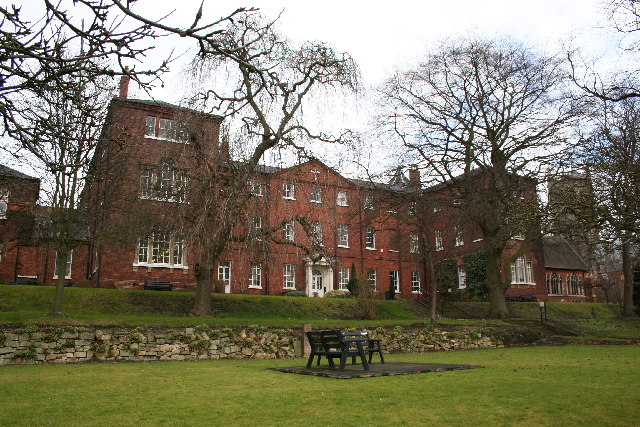
- Type: Private, Christian
- Active: 1874–1995
- Location: Lincoln, England
- Campus: Drury Lane, Lincoln

Lincoln Theological College was a Church of England theological college in Lincoln, England.

== History ==
Founded by Edward White Benson, when he was chancellor of Lincoln Cathedral, the college opened on 25 January 1874. It was also known as Scholae Cancellarii. The building it occupied on Drury Lane, which was originally the county infirmary, closed in 1995 after having its permit as a college recognised for ordination training withdrawn by the Church of England owing to reduced numbers of residential ordination candidates nationally, with an increasing number training on part-time non-residential courses. The college had wanted to remain open, developing itself as a research institution, possibly affiliated to a nearby university. The buildings are now owned by the Lincoln Theological Institute for the Study of Religion and Society (a registered charity), based at the University of Manchester, established in 1997 by Martyn Percy.

Once Lincoln Theological College had closed, the only Anglican theological college in the East Midlands offering training for those entering stipendiary ministry was St John's College, Nottingham, in Bramcote.

== Name ==
Until the middle of the 20th century the college was known as Scholae Cancellarii (the Chancellor's School) or as Bishop's Hostel Lincoln. Its warden, Kenneth Sansbury, introduced the name of Lincoln Theological College as the Latin name "meant nothing to the ordinary person" and Michael Ramsey had suggested that Bishop's Hostel sounded like "a home for rough boys".

== Curriculum ==
At the time of its closure the college offered studies leading to externally validated and conferred Bachelor of Theology and MA degrees.

== Affiliations ==
Lincoln Theological College worked closely with the then-named Bishop Grossteste College, which at the time was a Church of England teacher training college, and shared courses. It also worked with the University of Nottingham which validated the BEd degrees of BGC.

In 2009 a School of Theology and Ministry Studies was formed following the signing, in Lincoln Cathedral, of an agreement between the University of Lincoln, Bishop Grosseteste University College, the Diocese of Lincoln and Lincoln Cathedral on 14 November 2009.

== Current situation ==
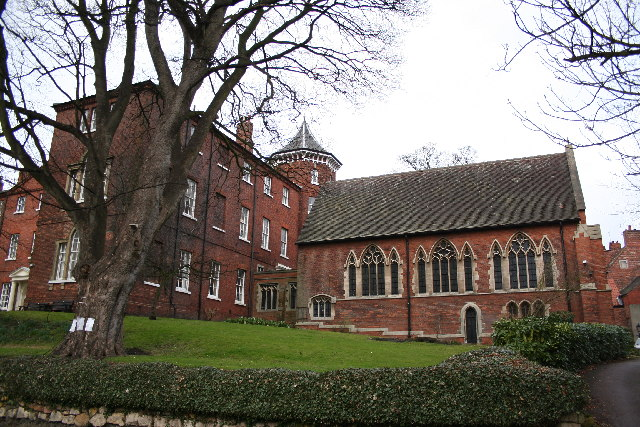
College chapel

The college's former building on Drury Lane was renamed Chad Varah House, in honour of the Samaritans' founder, who was educated at the college and served his title in Lincoln. The building itself is a Grade II Listed building. The original County Hospital was built 1776–77, designed by John Carr from York and William Lumby. The chapel was added in 1906 by architect Temple Moore. At some point in the late 19th century a large house and water tower were added, and in 1962 the building was extended at the rear.

== Notable alumni ==
- Hugh Edward Ashdown
- Edwin Boston
- Henry R. T. Brandreth
- Antony Bridge
- Richard Chartres – former Bishop of London
- John Dudley Davies
- Patrick Evans
- John Frewer
- Hohn Gibbs
- John Green – Royal Navy chaplain and Chaplain of the Fleet
- John Grindrod
- Lemprière Durell Hammond
- Alfred Jowett
- Charles John Klyberg
- John Moses
- Edward Norman
- Michael John Nott
- Paul Oestreicher
- Regin Prenter
- Gerald Sharp
- John Shone
- Ulrich Ernst Simon
- Mark Strange – current Bishop of Moray, Ross and Caithness and Primus of the Scottish Episcopal Church
- Richard Henry McPhail Third
- Kenneth George Thompson
- Mark Tully – later BBC correspondent
- Chad Varah – founder of Samaritans
- Jeremy Walsh
- Ambrose Walter Marcus Weekes
- Alan Peter Winton – current Bishop of Thetford
- John Yates

== Notable staff ==
=== Sub-wardens ===
- Michael Ramsey from 1930 to 1936 – later Archbishop of Canterbury from 1961 to 1974
- Eric Lionel Mascall from 1937 to 1945
- Basil Stanley Moss from 1946 to 1951
- Thomas George Adames Baker from 1954 to 1960
- David Lunn from 1966 to 1970 – later Bishop of Sheffield

=== Wardens ===
- Lonsdale Ragg 1899-1916
- Walter Julius Carey from 1919 to 1921
- Alfred C. W. Rose 1921-1927
- Leslie Owen 1928-1936
- Eric Symes Abbott from 1936 to 1945
- Cyril Kenneth Sansbury from 1945 to 1952
- Oliver Stratford Tomkins from 1953 to 1959
- Alan Brunskill Webster from 1959 to 1970
- Alec Graham from 1970 to 1977
- Bill Jacob from 1985 to 1996
