= Dilly Knox =

English cryptographer (1884–1943)

Alfred Dillwyn Knox CMG
- Born: Alfred Dillwyn Knox; 23 July 1884; Headington, Oxford, England
- Died: 27 February 1943 (aged 58); Wycombe, Buckinghamshire, England
- Other name: Dilly
- Citizenship: British
- Education: King's College, Cambridge
- Occupations: Codebreaker; Papyrologist
- Employers: Room 40; GC&CS
- Title: Fellow of King's College, Cambridge; Companion of the Order of St Michael and St George
- Spouse: Olive Rodman (m. 1920)
- Children: 2
- Parent: Edmund Arbuthnott Knox
- Relatives: E. V. Knox; Wilfred Knox; Ronald Knox; Winifred Peck; Penelope Fitzgerald

Alfred Dillwyn "Dilly" Knox, CMG (23 July 1884 – 27 February 1943) was an English classics scholar and papyrologist at King's College, Cambridge and a codebreaker. As a member of the Room 40 codebreaking unit he helped decrypt the Zimmermann Telegram which brought the USA into the First World War. He then joined the Government Code and Cypher School (GC&CS).

As chief cryptographer, Knox played an important role in the Polish–French–British meetings on the eve of the Second World War which disclosed Polish cryptanalysis of the Axis Enigma to the Allies.

At Bletchley Park, he worked on the cryptanalysis of Enigma ciphers until his death in 1943. He built the team and discovered the method that broke the Italian Naval Enigma, producing the intelligence credited with Allied victory at the Battle of Cape Matapan. In 1941, Knox broke the Abwehr Enigma. By the end of the war, Intelligence Service Knox had disseminated 140,800 Abwehr decrypts, including intelligence important for D-Day.

== Personal life and family ==
Dillwyn Knox, the fourth of six children, was the son of Edmund Knox, tutor at Merton College and later Bishop of Manchester; he was the brother of E. V. Knox, Wilfred Knox, Ronald Knox, Ethel Knox, and Winifred Peck, and uncle of the novelist Penelope Fitzgerald. His father was a descendant of John Arbuthnott, 8th Viscount of Arbuthnott.

Dillwyn—known as "Dilly"—Knox was educated at Summer Fields School, Oxford, and then Eton College. He studied classics at King's College, Cambridge from 1903, and in 1909 was elected a Fellow following the death of Walter Headlam, from whom he inherited extensive research into the works of Herodas. While an undergraduate he was friends with Lytton Strachey and John Maynard Keynes. He and Keynes were lovers at Eton. Knox privately coached Harold Macmillan, the future Prime Minister, at King's for a few weeks in 1910, but Macmillan found him "austere and uncongenial".

He married Olive Rodman in 1920, forgetting to invite two of his three brothers to his wedding. The couple had two sons, Oliver and Christopher.

He was an atheist. (Note: "Dillwyn [Knox, son of an Evangelical bishop] was from his student years an unwavering atheist." Alan Hollinghurst, "The Victory of Penelope Fitzgerald" (a review of Hermione Lee, Penelope Fitzgerald [a niece of Alfred Dillwyn Knox]: A Life, Knopf, 488 pp.), The New York Review of Books, vol. LXI, no. 19 (4 December 2014), p. 8. (The article comprises pp. 8, 10, 12.))

== Academic scholarship ==
Between the two World Wars Knox worked on the great commentary on Herodas that had been started by Walter Headlam, damaging his eyesight while studying the British Museum's collection of papyrus fragments, but finally managing to decipher the text of the Herodas papyri. The Knox-Headlam edition of Herodas finally appeared in 1922.

== Codebreaking ==
=== First World War ===
The sailor in Room 53
Has never, it's true, been to sea.
But though not in a boat,
He has yet served afloat—
In a bath in the Admiralty.

— Knox about himself in Alice in ID25

Soon after war broke out in 1914, Knox was recruited to the Royal Navy's cryptological effort in Room 40 of the Admiralty Old Building, where some of his work was done in the bath. He persuaded his superiors to have a bathtub installed in his office in the cryptanalysis section of the British Admiralty (in Room 53). In 1917, Knox followed Room 40 with its expansion into ID25.

Among other tasks, he was involved in breaking:

- the Zimmermann Telegram, which contributed to bringing the USA into the war.
- much of the German admiral's flag code by exploiting an operator's love of romantic poetry.

=== Between the wars ===
==== Government Code and Cypher School ====
Oh, if a time should ever come when we're demobilized How we shall miss the interests which once life comprised!

— Dilly the Dodo, Alice in ID25 by Frank Birch

During the First World War he had been elected Librarian at King's College, but never took up the appointment. After the war Knox intended to resume his research at King's, but was persuaded by his wife to remain at his secret work; indeed, so secret was this work that his own children had no idea, until many years after his death, what he did for a living, and his contribution to the war effort.

==== Commercial Enigma ====
The Enigma machine became available commercially in the 1920s. In Vienna in 1925, Knox bought the Enigma 'C' machine evaluated by Hugh Foss in 1927 on behalf of GC&CS. Foss found "a high degree of security" but wrote a secret paper describing how to attack the machine if cribs – short sections of plain text – could be guessed. When – a decade later – Knox picked up this work, he developed a more effective algebraic system (rodding) based on the principles described by Foss.

==== Spanish Enigma ====
The Germany Navy (Kriegsmarine) adopted Enigma in 1926, adding a plug-board (stecker) to improve security. Nazi Germany supplied non-steckered machines to Franco's Nationalists in the Spanish Civil War. On 24 April 1937, Knox broke the Spanish Enigma but knowledge of this breakthrough was not shared with the Republicans. (Note: Keeley 2008 States "Professor Denis Smyth, of the University of Toronto, an expert on Second World War intelligence operations, said that the British codebreaker Alfred Dilwyn Knox cracked the code of Franco's machine in 1937, but 'this information was not passed on to the Republicans.'") Soon afterwards, Knox began to attack signals between Spain and Germany encrypted using steckered Enigma machines.

==== On the eve of the Second World War ====
===== Polish–French–British meetings =====
GC&CS began to discuss Enigma with the French Deuxième Bureau in 1938, obtaining from the Bureau details of Wehrmacht Enigma supplied by Asché and signal intercepts, some of which must have been made in Eastern Europe. This led the French to disclose their links with the Biuro Szyfrów (Polish cryptographers). Knox, Hugh Foss and Alastair Denniston represented the GC&CS at the first Polish–French–British meeting at Paris in January 1939. The Poles were under order to disclose nothing of importance, leaving the British codebreakers disappointed. Knox's description of his system of rodding impressed the Polish codebreakers and they requested his presence at a second meeting.

Knox grasped everything very quickly, almost quick as lightning. It was evident that the British had been really working on Enigma ... So they didn't require explanations. They were specialists of a different kind, of a different class.

— Marian Rejewski

Knox attended the second Polish–French–British conference, held on 25–26 July 1939 at the Polish Cipher Bureau (at Pyry, south of Warsaw, Poland). The Poles began to disclose to their French and British allies their achievements in solving Enigma decryption.

Although Marian Rejewski, the Polish cryptographer and mathematician who solved the plugboard-equipped Enigma used by Nazi Germany, approached the problem through permutation theory (whereas Knox applied linguistics), a good personal relationship was quickly established at the conference. The good impression made by Rejewski on Knox played an important role in increasing recruitment of mathematicians to Bletchley Park. Knox was chagrined — but grateful — to learn how simple was the solution of the Enigma's entry ring (standard alphabetical order).

It was such an obvious thing to do, really a silly thing to do, that nobody, not Dilly Knox or Tony Kendrick or Alan Turing, ever thought it worthwhile trying it.

— Peter Twinn

After the meeting, he sent the Polish cryptologists a very gracious note in Polish, on official British government stationery, thanking them for their assistance and sending "sincere thanks for your cooperation and patience". Enclosed were a beautiful scarf featuring a picture of a Derby winner and a set of paper 'batons'.

I don't know how Knox's method was supposed to work, most likely he had hoped to vanquish Enigma with the batons. Unfortunately we beat him to it.

— Marian Rejewski

These 'batons' were known as rods to the British and had been used to solve the Spanish Enigma. Knox's rodding method was later used to break the Italian Naval Enigma.

==== Turing's bombe ====
Alan Turing worked on Enigma during the months leading to the outbreak of the Second World War in September 1939, and occasionally visited GC&CS's London HQ to discuss this problem with Knox. In the 1939 Register Turing was recorded as staying/ living in Naphill, staying with Knox and his wife. By November 1939 Turing had completed the design of the bombe — a radical improvement of the Polish bomba.

=== Second World War ===
==== Knox's rodding method ====
To break non-steckered Enigma machines (those without a plugboard), Knox (building on earlier research by Hugh Foss) developed a system known as 'rodding', a linguistic as opposed to mathematical way of breaking codes. This technique worked on the Enigma used by the Regia Marina (Italian Navy) and the German Abwehr. Knox worked in 'the Cottage', next door to the Bletchley Park mansion, as head of a research section, which contributed significantly to cryptanalysis of the Enigma.

Knox's team at The Cottage used rodding to decrypt intercepted Italian naval signals describing the sailing of an Italian battle fleet, leading to the Battle of Cape Matapan in March 1941. Admiral John Godfrey, Director of Naval Intelligence credited the Allied victory at Matapan to this intelligence; Admiral Sir Andrew Cunningham, who had commanded the victorious fleet at Matapan, went to Bletchley to congratulate 'Dilly and his girls'.

==== Intelligence Services Knox ====
In October 1941, Knox solved the Abwehr Enigma, although nothing was known about the machine itself. Intelligence Services Knox (ISK) was established to decrypt Abwehr communications. In early 1942, with Knox seriously ill, Peter Twinn took charge of running ISK and was appointed head after Knox's death. By the end of the war, ISK had decrypted and disseminated 140,800 messages. Intelligence gained from these Abwehr decrypts played an important part in ensuring the success of the Double-Cross System of MI5 and MI6, and in Operation Fortitude, the Allied campaign to deceive the Germans about D-Day.

==== Death ====
Knox's work was cut short when he fell ill with lymphoma. When he became unable to travel to Bletchley Park, he continued his cryptographic work from his home in Hughenden, Buckinghamshire, where he received the CMG. He died on 27 February 1943. A biography of Knox, written by Mavis Batey, one of 'Dilly's girls', the female codebreakers who worked with him, was published in September 2009.

== Classified poetry ==
These have knelled your fall and ruin, but your ears were far away
English lassies rustling papers through the sodden Bletchley day.

— Dilly Knox, Epitaph on Matapan to Mussolini

Knox celebrated the victory at Battle of Cape Matapan with poetry, which remained classified until 1978.
