= Robert Arbuthnot, 1st Viscount of Arbuthnott =

Scottish peer

Coat of Arms of the Viscounts of Arbuthnott

Robert Arbuthnot, 1st Viscount of Arbuthnott PC (before 1625 – 10 October 1655) was a Scottish Peer and Scottish Privy Counsellor (1649).

He was a son of Sir Robert Arbuthnott, 17th laird of Arbuthnott (normally referred to as Arbuthnott, of that Ilk) by Sir Robert's second wife, Margaret daughter of Simon Fraser, 6th Lord Lovat.

He married, firstly, Marjory Carnegie (daughter of David Carnegie, 1st Earl of Southesk), sometime before 1639, and had two children:

- Hon. Margaret Arbuthnot (before 1644–?), m. Hon. Sir Alexander Carnegie (d. 1682)
- Sir Robert Arbuthnot, 2nd Viscount of Arbuthnott (before 1648–16 June 1682)

He married secondly on 30 June 1653 his half first cousin Katherine Fraser (daughter of Hugh Fraser, 7th Lord Lovat), and had further children. Their common grandfather was Simon Fraser, 6th Lord Lovat.

He was knighted by King Charles I "for his enduring loyalty", and was a Ruling Elder in the General Assembly of the Church of Scotland in 1641.

He was created 1st Viscount of Arbuthnott, of County Kincardine and 1st Lord Inverbervie, Kincardineshire, on 16 November 1641 by Charles I who was trying to persuade him to support the Royalist cause.

Peerage of Scotland
New creation	Viscount of Arbuthnott; 1641–1655	Succeeded by Robert Arbuthnot
