= College of Veterinarians of Ontario =

- Abbreviation: CVO
- Formation: 24 September 1874; 152 years ago
- Type: Regulatory body
- Headquarters: Guelph, Ontario, Canada
- Location(s): 2-71 Hanlon Creek Blvd; Guelph, Ontario N1C 0B1
- Region served: Ontario, Canada
- President: Dr. Louise Kelly
- Registrar: Jan Robinson
- Website: www.cvo.org

The College of Veterinarians of Ontario is the body charged by the Government of Ontario with regulating practising veterinarians in the province. The authority comes from the Veterinarians Act, RSO 1990, c V.3. It is also Ontario's only regulatory college to not be headquartered in Toronto: its head office is in Guelph, Ontario, the location of the Ontario Veterinary College which is the province's only post-secondary institution providing training in veterinary medicine.
