= Dalcross Castle =

Castle in Highland, Scotland

Coordinates: 57.5083°N 4.0402°W

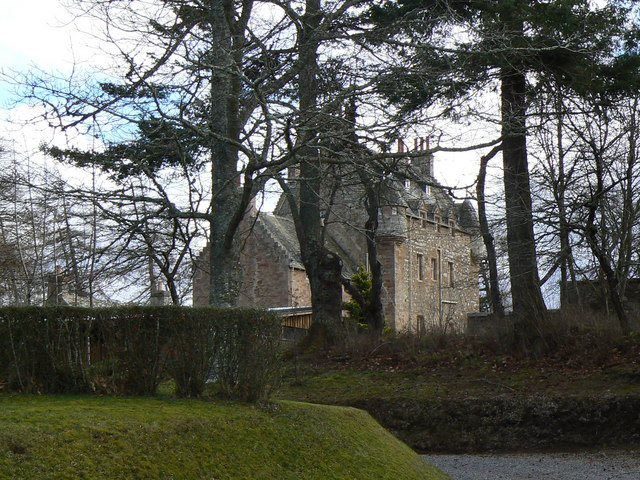
- Dalcross Castle viewed from grounds

- Location within Inverness area
- Location: Croy, Highland
- OS grid reference: NH 77860 48289

History
- Built: 17th century

Listed Building – Category A
- Official name: Dalcross Castle and Garden Wall
- Designated: 5 October 1971
- Reference no.: LB1713

Inventory of Gardens and Designed Landscapes in Scotland
- Official name: Dalcross Castle
- Designated: 1 July 1987
- Reference no.: GDL00125

Listed Building – Category C(S)
- Official name: Dalcross Castle, Entrance Arch and Gate Lodge
- Designated: 17 April 1986
- Reference no.: LB1714

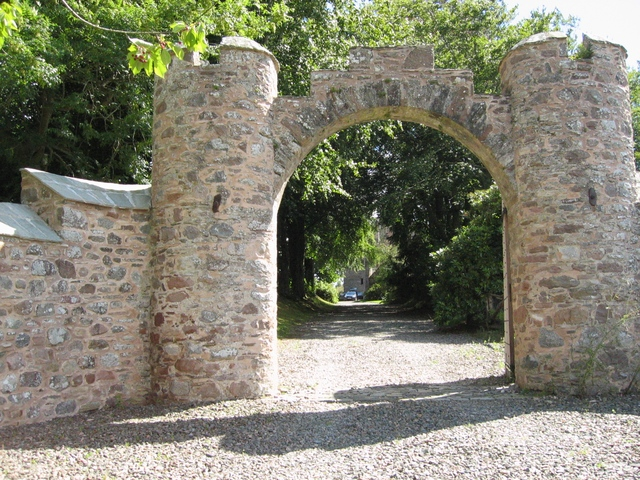
Dalcross Castle gateway

Dalcross Castle is a restored 17th century tower house, about 1 1/2 miles (2.5 kilometres) southwest of Croy, Highland, Scotland, and about 7 miles (11 kilometres) northeast of Inverness. The castle stands on a ridge.

== History ==
The Frasers of Lovat owned the property and the 6th Lord Lovat built a castle here in 1621. (Note: The archaeological notes in the Historic Environment Scotland record are based on sources including MacGibbon and Ross (1887–92) in which it states Dalcross to have been built by the 8th Lord Lovat. This matches with numbering of Lord Lovats given in others sources of the period such as MacKenzie (1896), but differs from modern lists.)

The property passed onto the Mackintoshes soon after. Sir Lachlan Mackintosh of Mackintosh, clan chief, died here in 1704. By 1731 the next chief, also Lachlan, died and his body was interred at Dalcross so that his people could pay their respects. When he was buried in the family vault at Petty some 4,000 people attended with the cortege stretching four miles from Dalcross to Petty.

Prior to the battle of Culloden the Hanoverian troops mustered here in 1746.

The house was abandoned, and became ruinous, but it was restored and reoccupied in the 20th century, by descendants of the Mackintosh lairds. The restoration of the castle was probably by W L Carruthers, in 1896.

The castle became a category A listed building on 5 October 1971, and the entrance arch and gate lodge became a category C listed building 17 April 1986. In 1987 it was also listed as an Inventory of Gardens and Designed Landscapes in Scotland.

It was bought in 1996 and modernised by Maxwell & Company Architects. The project was completed in 2003.

By 2008 the castle was available for up to 12 guests to stay in.

== Structure ==
Although referred to as an L-plan castle, it may be better described as two offset wings joined at the corner. One wing has five storeys and an attic, while the other has three, their connection being a projecting square tower, which has a bartizan, and is topped by a garbled watch-chamber, this creates two re-entrant angles. There have been extensions since the castle was originally built, including a two-storey 18th-century addition to the north gable.

There are many gunloops and shot-holes in the walls, while many windows still have their iron yetts. At the foot of the square stair-tower is the entrance from the courtyard, leading to a vaulted basement. This basement contains cellars, a kitchen with a large arched fireplace, and a wine cellar with a small staircase to the fine first storey hall, which may also be reached by the wide main stair. above. The ashlar chimney piece has a moulded surround a coat of arms, and the motto, “Je Trouve Bien”. The upper bedroom quarters may be reached by a small turnpike stair. A massive chimney stack tops the east wall of the north wing.

The building is of red rubble, with tooled and polished ashlar dressings. The doorway has filleted roll to moulded door jambs, and stepped hood mould. The panel above the doorway shows the date 1720.

Some windows, including dormers, were added in 1896.

There are gardens surrounded by a coped wall of red rubble.
