= Bishop of Coventry (suffragan) =

(Anglican Suffragan bishop in diocese of Worcester)

The Bishop of Coventry was a suffragan bishop of the Church of England Diocese of Worcester in the Province of Canterbury.

In the late nineteenth century there were two suffragan bishops of Coventry appointed to assist John Perowne, Bishop of Worcester, in overseeing the Diocese of Worcester.

Bishops of Coventry
From	Until	Incumbent	Notes
1891	1894	Henry Bowlby	
1894	1903	Edmund Knox	Translated to Manchester.
1903	1918	No suffragan bishops appointed.	
In 1918, the suffragan see ended with the creation of the diocesan see.
