= Edith Williams =

Canadian veterinarian (1899–1979)

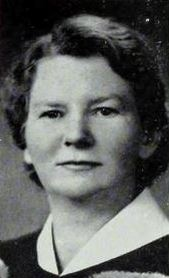
- 1941 graduation photograph
- Born: Edith Bickerton Williams; 24 June 1899; York, Toronto Ontario, Canada
- Died: 24 November 1979 (aged 80); Toronto, Ontario, Canada
- Other name: Bud Williams
- Occupations: farmer, veterinarian
- Years active: 1927-1976
- Known for: archive of letters with her partner Frieda Fraser

Edith Williams (24 June 1899 – 24 November 1979) was a Canadian veterinarian, the second woman from the country to complete her training at the Ontario Veterinary College and life partner of Dr Frieda Fraser. Initially entering university in 1916, Williams dropped out after one year. After a three-year trip abroad while she worked as a clerk in a bank and the Canadian immigration office, she returned to Toronto and took up farming on a farm she had inherited. After ten years of raising livestock, Williams was accepted into veterinary school and graduated in 1941. For the next twenty-five years, she had a private small-animal veterinary practice in Toronto. During the periods when Fraser and Williams were separated, they wrote letters daily. Their correspondence was preserved and donated after Fraser's death to the University of Toronto libraries. It is a unique portrait of lesbian life in the early twentieth century, as few such records have survived.

== Early life ==
Edith Bickerton Williams, was born on 24 June 1899 in York, Toronto, Ontario, Canada to Mary Jane (née Mitchell) and Arthur Robins Williams. Her father was originally from Birmingham, England and worked as an insurance clerk. She had two older sisters, Mary and Betty and was early on given the nickname "Bud", possibly because her parents had hoped for a son, or possibly because a niece or nephew had trouble pronouncing Edith. Williams attended a private girls' school, Glen Mawr, in Toronto for ten years before enrolling in University College in 1916. Joining the Kappa Alpha Theta sorority, Williams met Frieda Fraser in 1917, beginning a relationship that would last through her lifetime. After attending only one year, she dropped out but continued to see Fraser and exchanged letters with her whenever they were apart. After her father's death in 1921, Williams' family increasingly pressed her to find a husband. In 1925, concerned that the two women were spending too much time together, the family sent her to England to care for two aging aunts.

== Career ==
Arriving in England, Williams initially took a position in a bank in London. After some time, she began working as a clerk in the London branch of the Ontario Immigration Department, processing emigration forms for people wanting to move to Canada. During this time, the letters which she and Fraser exchanged became more intense and were an almost daily occurrence. In the letters they solidified their relationship discussing their parents' objections, their devotion to each other, their work, and their dreams. They hoped to live together and raise a child, or even a set of twins. After nearly three years abroad, Williams returned to Canada initially settling in with her mother while she applied to the Ontario School of Agriculture, but was denied admittance. She had received an inheritance from a relative of a farm near Aurora, Ontario and wanted to gain knowledge about husbandry. For the next several years, she and Fraser lived apart but within a 30-minute walk from each other at various residences, while Williams repeatedly applied for admittance to the agricultural college and Ontario Veterinary College (OVC) and raised poultry on her farm.

In 1933, Williams moved to the farm full-time, returning to Toronto only on weekends to sell her produce and see Fraser. Her mother lived with her and they rented the Toronto family home to earn money. Finally in 1937, Williams was accepted at the Veterinary College and began attending classes and that same year Fraser's mother died, finally opening a path for the couple to live together. Though the only woman in her class, Williams believed that being a female veterinarian would be an advantage because many pet owners of small animals were women and saw her as empathetic. Williams graduated in 1941 and after completing a short internship in Montreal, returned to Toronto and opened her own practice. When she graduated, she was only the second Canadian woman who had been graduated with a veterinary degree from OVC.

Williams established her practice at St. Clair and Mount Pleasant in Toronto and she and Fraser rented a house nearby on Heathdale Road. That same year, 1941, they took in a child, a war refugee from Britain named Jenny Rodd, who remained with them until the war ended. Williams specialized as a surgeon for small animals and preferred working with dogs and cats. Recognizing the biases men had against women working as veterinarians, she took on other women as assistants or partnered her clinic with them, helping such women as Frances M. Gage, Suzanne Morrow Francis and Audrey Ellen Martin, establish their careers.

In her 40s, Williams developed the hobby of mountaineering, but she had always enjoyed the out-of-doors, frequently taking camping or canoeing trips with groups of other women friends. She and Fraser had a wide circle of friends, including such women as Frances Loring and Florence Wyle, for whom she also served as doctor for their cats. In 1959, the couple purchased a house located on Burlington Crescent, near Edith's clinic and lived there until their retirement. At that time, they sold their home and moved to the family farm of Fraser in the town of Burlington, Ontario. The farm was located on the Niagara Escarpment, near the Bruce Trail and was in a very scenic setting. Fraser enjoyed gardening and the grounds were well tended. Williams was an outstanding cook, who enjoyed cooking for their frequent guests.

== Death and legacy ==
Williams had a severe stroke in December 1976 and never fully recovered from it, requiring repeated hospitalizations at Queen Elizabeth Hospital. Fraser drove in daily from Burlington to visit Williams until her death on 24 November 1979, after two additional strokes. Upon her death, friends collected funds and established a bursary bearing Williams' name at the University of Guelph to be awarded to undergraduate students studying veterinary medicine in financial need.

After Fraser's death, her family donated the couple's letters to the University of Toronto archives. The correspondence covers the period from 1925 to 1941, the period when the couple was separated. A closed archive, it can be accessed with family permission. The archive contains nearly 1000 letters and is "one of the largest known collections detailing the experiences of women's same-sex sexuality in early twentieth century North America". The two women did not refer to themselves as lesbian, though they were familiar with the term. Given the cultural norm of their time which depicted same-sex couples as diseased, they referred to themselves as "devoted women", making the distinction that they were not depraved, but had chosen their partnership. They used their letters to create and define their relationship and frankly discuss not only other same-sex partnerships, but to evaluate what they believed about their attraction. Both dismissed Freud and pseudo-scientific theories which argued for a natural order that governed human actions, instead believing that their attraction was biological and innate, and not influenced by promiscuous living or self-loathing. The collection of letters is an important archive for the historical study of how sexual identity is developed and acknowledged within the contemporary context of an epoch and is a unique collection in that most such archives have not survived.
