= E. V. Knox =

Edmund George Valpy Knox (10 May 1881 – 2 January 1971) was a British poet and satirist who wrote under the pseudonym Evoe. He was editor of Punch 1932–1949, having been a regular contributor in verse and prose for many years.

== Life ==
Knox was the eldest son of Edmund Arbuthnott Knox, a descendant of John Arbuthnott, 8th Viscount of Arbuthnott. He was a brother of the Roman Catholic priest and author Ronald Knox, the codebreaker Dilly Knox, the Anglican priest and New Testament scholar Wilfred Knox, the author Winifred Peck, and Ethel Knox. His daughter, the novelist Penelope Fitzgerald, wrote a biography of the four brothers titled The Knox Brothers.

He was educated at King Edward's School, Birmingham and Rugby.

His first marriage was in 1912 to Christina Frances Hicks, born 1885. They had children Penelope Fitzgerald (born 1916, died 2000) and Edmund Rawle Valpy Knox (journalist, died 5 June 1994). Christina died in 1935. He remarried in 1937, to Mary Shepard, illustrator of Mary Poppins and daughter of E.H. Shepard who illustrated Winnie the Pooh and The Wind in the Willows.

He served in the Lincolnshire Regiment during the First World War, and Punch reported in October 1917 that he had been wounded.

As a poet, he was noted for his ability to provide topical satirical poems for Punch in the style of well-known contemporary poets such as John Drinkwater, John Masefield, Walter de la Mare, Edmund Blunden, Robert Bridges and J. C. Squire – usually managing to evoke the poet's general style and manner without resorting to parodying any particular poem.

Although best known for satire, some of his more serious poems, written during the Second World War while he held the editor's chair at Punch, evoke by turns wistful nostalgia, grim determination, and a longing for eventual peace, often using metres from Greek or Latin poetry or historical English forms. Although for the greater part of his life an agnostic, he gradually drifted back into the Church of England.

During the mid 1930s he edited the book series Methuen's Library of Humour.

== Books ==
Collections of Evoe's writings, usually reprinted from the pages of Punch, were published as follows:

- The Brazen Lyre (1911)
- A Little Loot (1920)
- Parodies Regained (1921)
- These Liberties (1923)
- Fiction as She is Wrote (1923)
- An Hour from Victoria (1924)
- Fancy Now (1924)
- Quaint Specimens (1925)
- Poems of Impudence (1926)
- It Occurs to Me (1926)
- Awful Occasions (1927)
- I'll Tell the World (1928)
- Gorgeous Times (1928)
- Wonderful Outings (1928)
- Here's Misery! (1928)
- This Other Eden (1929)
- Blue Feathers (1929)
- Things that Annoy Me (1932)
- Folly Calling (1932)
- Slight Irritations (1933)
- In My Old Days (1969)
