= Simon Fraser, 6th Lord Lovat =

Scottish courtier and landowner (1570–1633)

Simon Fraser, 6th Lord Lovat (1570–1633) was a Scottish courtier and landowner.

Simon Fraser was the son of Hugh Fraser, 5th Lord Lovat and Elizabeth Stewart daughter of John Stewart, 4th Earl of Atholl. He was born on 13 April 1570.

== Biography ==
His first wife was Katherine Mackenzie daughter of Colin Mackenzie of Kintail. They married at Dingwall in 1589. She died in 1593 in childbirth in the painted (Gaelic: "brech" or "briadh") chamber at Beauly Priory.

In January 1595 the Earl of Atholl, Lovat, and Kenneth Mackenzie were kept prisoners in Linlithgow Palace, in order to pacify "Highland matters". Lovat was in favour with the king in June 1595 and rode with him from Linlithgow Palace to Stirling Castle. In April 1596 he married Jean Stewart, daughter of James Stewart, 1st Lord Doune and Margaret Campbell, who was a lady in waiting to Anne of Denmark. As a wedding gift James VI of Scotland gave her two expensive velvet gowns, one purple and one black with gold passementerie. Jean Stewart also had valuable rights over the possessions of several forfeited members of the Gordon family who had killed her brother James Stewart, 2nd Earl of Moray at Donibristle in 1592.

According to the 17th-century family historian, James Fraser, James VI had offered Lovat the pick of the ladies at court to marry. At first his choice Jean Stewart refused him saying, "Sir, he is not bonny." James VI and Anna of Denmark pointed out the compensatory value of his lands of Lovat and Beauly. James Fraser says the wedding was at Falkland Palace followed by a sumptuous and extravagant "in-fare" at Beauly. He noted that after bearing six children Jean Stewart was overweight "turning gross and too fat" and had no more, which he said was characteristic of the Stewarts of Doune.

Their homes included the Abbot's House at Beauly Priory, Beaufort, Bunchrive or Bunchrew, Dalcross Castle, and a lodging in Inverness. Jean Stewart was involved in the building projects, Dalcross is near her cousin's house at Castle Stewart. Timber for buildings at Bunchrive and Dalcross was brought from Dalcattaig woods, and freestone from Caucy quarry. James Fraser, who was the grandson of their master of household, used their household books and papers in his chronicle of the family, and claimed that for his hospitality Fraser was known as the "Common Cooke of the North".

Fraser attended the parliament to forfeit the Earl of Gowrie in 1600. In 1617 Fraser and Jean Stewart went to Edinburgh to meet the king, and Fraser sat again in parliament.

He died at Bunchrew on 15 April 1633, and was buried, not according to family tradition at Beauly, but at Kirkhill. He was succeeded as Lord Lovat by his son Hugh Fraser, 7th Lord Lovat.

== Family ==
The children of Lord Lovat and Katherine Mackenzie included:

- Hugh Fraser, 7th Lord Lovat, who married his cousin Isobella Wemyss, daughter of Sir John Wemyss of Wemyss and Mary Stewart
- Elizabeth Fraser, who married Alexander Dunbar (d. 1622).

Fraser and Jean Stewart had six children including:

- Anna Fraser, named after the queen, was born in March 1597 and died in 1603.
- Sir James Fraser of Inverallochy
- Sir James Fraser of Brea, father of the Covenanter James Fraser of Brea
- Margaret Fraser, who married (1) Robert Arbuthnott of Arbuthnott in 1617, (2) John Haldane of Gleneagles in 1633. Her portrait was painted in 1666 and she wears mourning clothes with an heirloom diamond set jewel with three pendant pearls, which may have belonged to her mother.
- Simon Fraser, knight

Jean Stewart died at Bunchrew in 1622.

Fraser married thirdly Katherine Rose of Moynes, widow of James Grant of Logie, daughter of William Rose of Kilravock, in 1624.

Peerage of Scotland
Preceded by Hugh Fraser	Lord Lovat; 1577–1633	Succeeded by Hugh Fraser
