= Henry Bowlby =

British Anglican bishop (1823–1894)

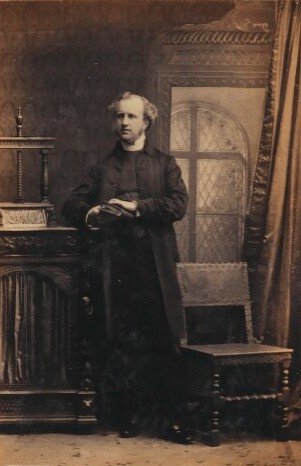
Henry Bowlby, 1862 photograph

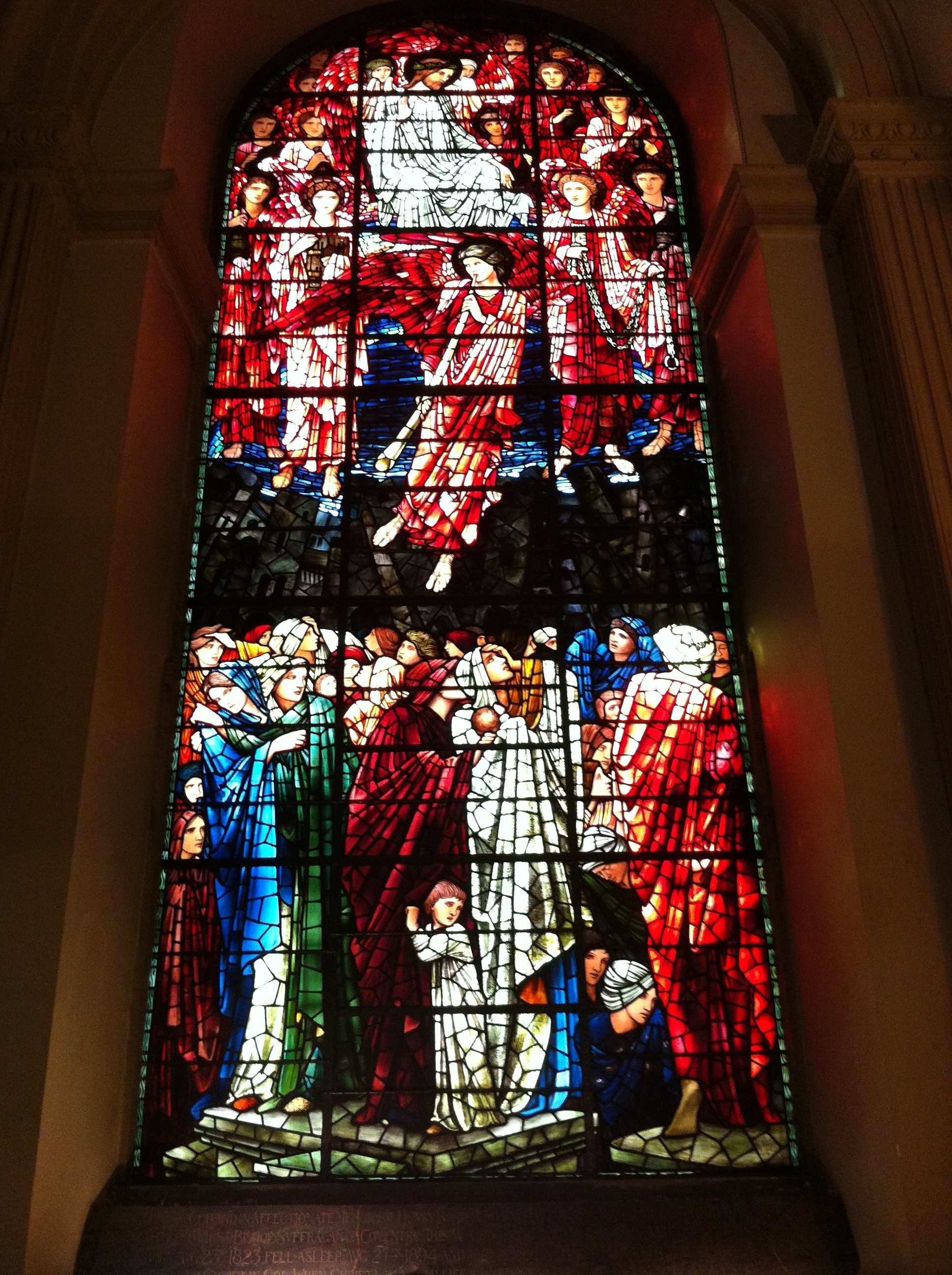
Stained-glass window by Edward Burne-Jones in St Philip's Cathedral, Birmingham in memory of Bowlby

Henry Bond Bowlby (23 August 1823 – 27 August 1894) was an English churchman, the Bishop of Coventry (a suffragan bishop in the Diocese of Worcester) from 1891 until 1894.

== Life ==
Born on 23 August 1823, son of Captain Peter Bowlby and Elizabeth Haslewood, he was educated at Wadham College, Oxford, where he graduated a Doctor of Divinity (DD). He was Vicar of Holy Trinity Church, Dartford, from 1867 to 1874 and became Rector of St Philip's, Birmingham in 1875, a post he retained upon becoming the first suffragan Bishop of Coventry in 1891. He was consecrated a bishop at St Paul's Cathedral on 29 September 1891, by Edward Benson, Archbishop of Canterbury. He continued in both positions until his death on 27 August 1894, aged 71 years.

== Family ==
Bowlby married firstly, Catherine Salmon, on 29 September 1852, and they had five children. After Catherine's death in 1875, he married secondly, Sarah Blowers King, on 21 September 1886.

Church of England titles
Preceded by first suffragan	Bishop of Coventry; 1891–1894	Succeeded by Edmund Knox
