= Eric Lionel Mascall =

English Anglican theologian and priest (1905–1993)

The Reverend E. L. Mascall OGS
- Born: Eric Lionel Mascall; 12 December 1905; London, England
- Died: 14 February 1993 (aged 87); Seaford, England

Ecclesiastical career
- Religion: Christianity (Anglican)
- Church: Church of England
- Ordained: 1933

Academic background
- Education: Pembroke College, Cambridge; Ely Theological College

Academic work
- Discipline: Theology
- Sub-discipline: Historical theology; philosophical theology
- School or tradition: Anglo-Catholicism; Thomism
- Institutions: Lincoln Theological College; Christ Church, Oxford; King's College, London

Eric Lionel Mascall OGS (1905–1993) was an English theologian and priest in the Anglo-Catholic tradition of the Church of England. He was a philosophical exponent of the Thomist tradition and was Professor of Historical Theology at King's College London (in the University of London). His name was styled as E. L. Mascall in most of his writings.

Mascall was for many years one of the major figures in British theology and well respected on the Continent and in North America. He authored more than 20 books in which he expounded Anglican theology in its most Catholic of forms. Mascall was arguably the most influential in a group of like-minded theologians, most of whom had predeceased him – Austin Farrer, Gregory Dix, Lionel Thornton and Gabriel Hebert.

== Life ==
Born in London on 12 December 1905, Eric Mascall was the son of John Mascall and his wife Susan. He was educated at Latymer Upper School, Pembroke College, Cambridge. In 1931 he entered Ely Theological College and was ordained in the Church of England in 1933.

After a period as a schoolmaster at Bablake School, Coventry, Mascall was ordained priest in 1933 at Southwark Cathedral, serving his first curacy at St Andrew's, Stockwell. In 1935 he crossed the river to St Matthew's, Westminster, in the Diocese of London. Subsequently, he taught theology at Lincoln Theological College and Christ Church, Oxford. He joined the Oratory of the Good Shepherd in 1938. In 1962 he became Professor of Historical Theology at King's College London and followed this appointment with a period as canon theologian of Truro Cathedral. He retired in 1973 and continued to live at the clergy house of St Mary's, Bourne Street. He spent part of 1976 as a visiting professor at the Gregorian University in Rome.

Mascall died on 14 February 1993 in Seaford, East Sussex.

=== Intellectual interests ===
Mascall was a devout Anglo-Catholic but his early studies were in mathematics. He took a first in the subject at Pembroke College, and the Mathematical Tripos at Cambridge. He remained engaged in relations between the Anglican Communion, Roman Catholic Church and Eastern Orthodox Churches. Mascall wrote on many theological themes as well as natural theology; these included the above-mentioned ecumenism in The Recovery of Unity (1958), science and religion in his Bampton Lectures, Christian Theology and Natural Science (1956), regarded by many at the time of its publication as the best book on the subject in English. His previous training in mathematics served him and readers well throughout his ministry. He also produced several publications opposing the ordination of women.

== Works ==
- (editor) The Church of God: An Anglo-Russian Symposium (London: SPCK, 1934)
- Man: His Origin and Destiny (Westminster: Dacre Press, 1940)
- He Who Is: A Study in Traditional Theism. London: Longmans, Green and Co., 1943, 1945.
- A Guide to Mount Carmel, Being a Summary and an Analysis of The Ascent of Mount Carmel by St. John of the Cross, with Some Introductory Notes. Westminster: Dacre Press, 1944.
- Christ, the Christian and the Church: A Study of the Incarnation and Its Consequences. London: Longmans, 1946.
- Existence and Analogy: A Sequel to "He Who Is". London: Longmans, Green and Co., 1949.
- The Mother of God: A Symposium by Members of the Fellowship of St. Alban and St. Sergius. London: Dacre Press, 1949.
- The Angels of Light and the Powers of Darkness: A Symposium by Members of the Fellowship of S. Alban and S. Sergius. Westminster: Faith Press, 1954.
- The Convocations and South India: What Did the Convocations Decide, and How Does Their Decision Affect the Catholicity of the Church of England, London: A. R. Mowbray and Co., 1955.
- Via Media: An Essay in Theological Synthesis. London: Longmans, Green and Co., 1956.
- Words and Images: A Study in Theological Discourse. London: Longmans, Green and Co., 1957.
- Lambeth 1958 and Christian Unity (London: The Faith Press, 1958)
- Mascall, Eric Lionel (1958). The Recovery of Unity: A Theological Approach. London: Longmans.
- Ten, który jest: studium z teizmu tradycyjnego. Warsaw: Instytut Wydawniczy Pax, 1958.
- The Importance of Being Human: Some Aspects of the Christian Doctrine of Man (Columbia University Press, 1958)
- Pi in the High. London: Faith Press, 1959.
- What Do We Mean by the Creation of the World? London: SPCK, 1960.
- Grace and Glory. London: Faith Press, 1961.
- Theology and History: An Inaugural Lecture Delivered at King's College, London, 23 October 1962. Westminster: Faith Press, 1962.
- The Blessed Virgin Mary: Essays by Anglican Writers, ed. by E. L. Mascall and H. S. Box: Darton, Longman, and Todd, 1963.
- Theology and Images (London: A. R. Mowbray, 1963)
- Up and Down in Adria (London: The Faith Press, 1963)
- Corpus Christi: Essays on the Church and the Eucharist. London: Longmans, 1965.
- The Secularisation of Christianity: An Analysis and a Critique. London: Darton, Longman and Todd, 1965.
- The Christian Universe. London: Darton, Longman and Todd, 1966.
- "The Mother of God: An Address Given to the Ecumenical Society of the Blessed Virgin Mary", 9 January 1968. London: Ecumenical Society of the Blessed Virgin Mary, 1968.
- Theology and the Future Charles A. Hart Memorial Lectures (London: Darton, Longman & Todd, 1968)
- Words and Images: A Study in Theological Discourse. London: Darton, Longman and Todd, 1968.
- Cristianismo secularizado: análisis y crítica. Barcelona: Editorial Kairos, 1969.
- Sekularyzacja chrześcijaństwa. Warsaw: Pax, 1970.
- Théologie de L'Avenir. Desclée. Paris: 1970
- The Openness of Being: Natural Theology Today, Gifford Lectures (London: Westminster Press, 1971)
- Women Priests? London: Church Literature Association, 1973.
- The Importance of Being Human: Some Aspects of the Christian Doctrine of Man. Westport: Greenwood Press, 1974.
- Nature and Supernature. London: Darton, Longman and Todd, 1976.
- Whatever Happened to the Human Mind?: Essays in Christian Orthodoxy. London: SPCK, 1980.
- Theology and the Gospel of Christ: An Essay in Reorientation. London: SPCK, 1980.
- Jesus: Who He is, and How We Know Him. London: Darton, Longman and Todd, 1985.
- The Triune God: An Ecumenical Study. Worthing: Churchman Publishing, 1986.
- Chrześcijańska koncepcja człowieka i wszechświata Warsaw: Instytut Wydawniczy Pax, 1986.
- Otwartość bytu: teologia naturalna dzisiaj. Warsaw: Instytut Wydawniczy "Pax", 1988.
- Saraband: The memoirs of E. L. Mascall. Herefordshire: Gracewing, 1992. ISBN 9780852442227
