= Frances M. Gage =

Canadian sculptor

- Born: Frances Marie Gage; 22 August 1924; Windsor, Ontario, Canada
- Died: 26 November 2017 (aged 93); Cobourg, Ontario, Canada
- Occupations: Naval intelligence operator, sculptor
- Years active: 1944–2017

Frances M. Gage RCA (22 August 1924 – 26 November 2017) was a Canadian sculptor and one of the most prolific sculptors in the country. After serving in the intelligence service of the Women's Royal Canadian Naval Service (Wrens), she attended the Ontario College of Art and furthered her studies at the Art Students League of New York and L'Ecole des Beaux-Arts. She has been commissioned for over 500 pieces of work. Some of her most noted sculptures are Woman which was commissioned in 1968 by the Women's College Hospital and The Jenny commissioned by the Wrens to commemorate their war service.

== Early life ==
Frances Marie Gage was born on 22 August 1924 in Windsor, Ontario, Canada to Jean Mildred (née Collver) and Russell Gage. She was one of four children. Her father worked in the automobile industry and her mother, of Irish descent raised the couple's children. During her childhood, the family moved to Oshawa, where she attended King Street School and then attended high school at the Oshawa Collegiate and Vocational Institute. She graduated in 1944.

== Career ==
As soon as she graduated, Gage joined the Women's Royal Canadian Naval Service (Wrens). After her basic training at HMCS Conestoga, she was sent to Signal School in Saint-Hyacinthe, Quebec and from there transferred into the Telegrapher Special Operator section, a part of the Intelligence Corps. In 1945, she shipped with fifteen other Wrens to Bainbridge Island near Seattle, Washington, on loan to the U.S. Navy, but returned to Canada before the war ended. One of her last tasks while enlisted was to use her artistic skills to help design a new Canadian flag, though after months of work on the project, it was shelved. Gage opted to resign from the Navy and use her veterans' benefit to attend university.

Gage applied to the Ontario Veterinary College and was placed on a waiting list, which might mean her entry to university was delayed for two years. She returned to Oshawa and after doing a few temporary jobs, was hired at the YWCA. After working there for a year, she decided to enroll in early 1947 at the Ontario College of Art to study sculpting and graduated in 1951. With no prospects for work as a sculptor, between 1951 and 1953, Gage took several part-time jobs, working as an assistant to the veterinarian, Dr. Edith Williams and as a teaching assistant. Through her association with Williams and her partner, physician Frieda Fraser, Gage met two other Toronto artists, Frances Loring and Florence Wyle. Loring and Wyle felt that Gage had talent and convinced Frieda Fraser to sponsor her in furthering her education at the Art Students League of New York. After studying for two years in New York City, Gage attended L'Ecole des Beaux-Arts in Paris for eighteen months on scholarship.

Completing her studies, Gage returned to Canada in 1957 and began working in Tom Thomson′s former cabin. She was influenced by the work of the Group of Seven. Two years later, she traded a work The Bear to build her own studio on Birch Avenue in Toronto. In 1971, she moved her studio to a property in Crosshill, Ontario, where she remained for sixteen years.

Gage has participated in numerous international exhibitions, including the "Congress of Medallic Arts in Florence, Italy (1984), in Colorado City, Colorado (1987), Helsinki, Finland (1990), and London, England (1992)". In addition, many of her commissioned works, are in galleries and both public and private spaces throughout Canada. Some of these include Discovery of the Hands which was commissioned by the Ontario Vocational Centre, London Campus, now Franshawe College, in 1963; Woman which was commissioned for the Women's College Hospital in 1967 and took three years to conceptualize and carve from Carrara marble; The Jenny, commissioned in 1972 as a tribute to the Wrens by the veterans group and initially donated to Galt, Ontario, where they trained (now at the Public Library of Cambridge, Ontario); a bas-relief portrait created for the University of Western Ontario of James Collip one of the researchers who helped isolate insulin; and crests in Toronto which adorn the Metro bridges; among some 500 other works. She also did a series of relief portraits of noted Canadians, including A. Y. Jackson, Ernest MacMillan, Frederick Varley, and Healey Willan, which were commissioned for Spencer Clark, the Canadian conservator.

Gage served on the council of the Royal Canadian Academy of Arts. She designed the Jean P. Carrière Award presented by the Standards Council of Canada and, in 1971, a commemorative medal of Samuel Bronfman.

== Death and legacy ==
Gage died on 26 November 2017 in Cobourg, Ontario, Canada and is remembered for her many public works on display.
