= John Arbuthnott, 9th Viscount of Arbuthnott =

Scottish peer and soldier

Coat of Arms of the Viscounts of Arbuthnott

John Arbuthnott, 9th Viscount of Arbuthnott, DL, JP (4 June 1806 – 26 May 1891) was a Scottish peer and soldier.

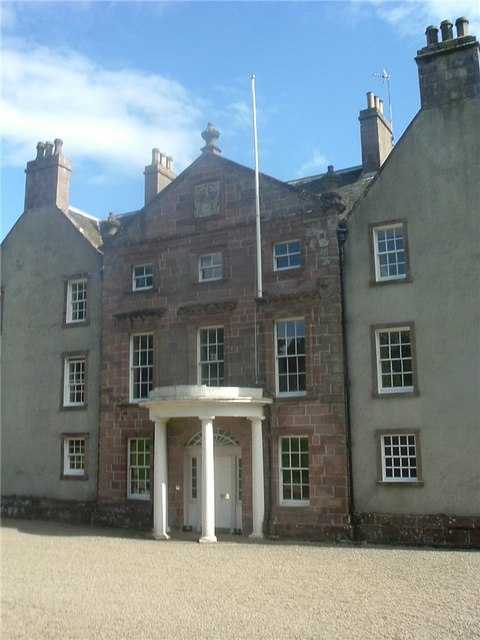
Arbuthnott House, Kincardineshire

Born at Arbuthnott House, he was the oldest son of John Arbuthnott, 8th Viscount of Arbuthnott and his wife Margaret, daughter of Walter Ogilvy, de jure 8th Earl of Airlie. In 1860, he succeeded his father as viscount. Arbuthnott was educated at Corpus Christi College, Oxford and matriculated on 28 June 1824.

He was commissioned Cornet in the 6th Dragoons in 1825 and purchased the ranks of Lieutenant in 1826 and Captain in 1830. He retired as Major on half-pay in 1850. He served as deputy lieutenant for Kincardineshire.

On 5 June 1837, he married his cousin Lady Jean (or Jane) Graham Drummond Ogilvy (born Midlothian 27 February 1818; died 4 March 1902), eldest daughter of David Ogilvy, 9th Earl of Airlie at Cortachy Castle, Angus. Arbuthnott died at his residence and was succeeded in his titles by his son John. Lady Arbuthnott died at her residence, Arbuthnott house, Fordoun, Kincardineshire, on 4 March 1902.

Peerage of Scotland
Preceded by John Arbuthnott	Viscount of Arbuthnott; 1860–1891	Succeeded by John Arbuthnott
