= John Arbuthnott, 10th Viscount of Arbuthnott =

- Viscount of Arbuthnott

Viscount of Arbuthnott
- Reign: 1891–1895
- Predecessor: John Arbuthnott, 9th Viscount of Arbuthnott
- Successor: David Arbuthnott, 11th Viscount of Arbuthnott
- Other titles: Deputy Lieutenant of Kincardineshire
- Born: John Arbuthnott; July 20, 1843; Kincardineshire
- Died: November 30, 1895 (aged 52); Arbuthnott House
- Noble family: Arbuthnott family
- Wife: Anna Harriet Allen
- Father: John Arbuthnott, 9th Viscount of Arbuthnott

Coat of Arms of the Viscounts of Arbuthnott

John Arbuthnott, 10th Viscount of Arbuthnott DL (b. Kincardineshire 20 July 1843 – d. Arbuthnott House 30 November 1895) was the son of John Arbuthnott, 9th Viscount of Arbuthnott whom he succeeded in 1891. Lt. 49th Foot Regiment. He was Deputy Lieutenant for Kincardineshire.

Married Anna Harriet Allen (born London 1852/3, died at Arbuthnott House 23 April 1892) at the home of her uncle, Inchmartine House, Inchture (Errol), 20 April 1871). Anna Harriet Allen was the only daughter of Edmund Allen of Strathmartin.

John Arbuthnott, 10th Viscount of Arbuthnott was succeeded by his brother David Arbuthnott, 11th Viscount of Arbuthnott.

Peerage of Scotland
Preceded by John Arbuthnott	Viscount of Arbuthnott; 1891–1895	Succeeded by David Arbuthnott
