= James Peck (civil servant) =

British civil servant and local government officer

Sir James Wallace Peck CB FRSE (3 May 1875 – 3 February 1964) was a British civil servant and local government officer.

== Early life, education, and career ==
Peck was born in Glasgow, the son of W. Edwin Peck, who worked for Andrew Walker, a linen and cotton merchant. The family lived at 146 Holland Street, a sloping street in Glasgow city centre. He was educated at the Royal Technical College, Glasgow, the University of Glasgow, and Christ Church, Oxford. From 1899, he lectured in mathematical physics at Glasgow University for four years before becoming an inspector of schools in Scotland in 1903.

In 1904, he was elected a Fellow of the Royal Society of Edinburgh. His proposers were Andrew Gray, Magnus Maclean, William Jack, and George Alexander Gibson.

== Local government and civil service career ==
In 1905, he was appointed principal assistant to Sir Robert Blair, director of the London County Council Education Service, and in 1910 returned to Scotland as clerk to the Edinburgh School Board. In 1912, he became chief inspector of National Health Insurance in Scotland.

On the outbreak of the First World War in 1914, he was commissioned into the Royal Field Artillery and served until 1918, reaching the rank of captain. In 1918, he was appointed senior assistant secretary of the Ministry of Food, a post which he held until the Ministry's disbandment in 1921, when he became chief inspector of the Scottish Board of Health.

From 1924 to 1926, he served as assistant secretary of the National Health Insurance Commission and was responsible for organising emergency arrangements for Scotland during the 1926 General Strike. In 1930, he returned to the Scottish Education Department as second secretary and became permanent secretary in 1936. In 1938, he was seconded to the Food (Defence Plans) Department, preparing for food control on the inevitable outbreak of the Second World War. When the war came, he was appointed chief divisional food controller for Scotland and held the post until his retirement in 1946.

Peck was appointed Companion of the Order of the Bath (CB) in the 1920 New Year War Honours and was knighted by King George VI in the 1938 New Year Honours.

== Family ==
In 1911, he married the novelist Winifred Knox, who died in November 1962. They had three sons.

== Publications ==
- Thermal Emissivity (1902)
- The Corpuscular Theories of Gravitation (1903)
