= Henry R. T. Brandreth =

Henry Renaud Turner Brandreth OGS (1914–1984) was an author, ecumenist and priest of the Church of England. He was a member of the Oratory of the Good Shepherd and a noted scholar of episcopi vagantes ("wandering bishops").

Brandreth spent much of his life researching a group of individuals commonly referred to as episcopi vagantes or wandering bishops. These were men who claimed apostolic succession through valid but irregular consecrations. Their ranks grew as they in turn consecrated a number of their followers. They were perceived as a threat to the Church of England whose leaders heard of their presence not only in England but also in Africa, America, India and all over Continental Europe. Brandreth was asked to present a report on their activities. This he did in addition to publishing two editions of a book on the subject. He acknowledged the sincerity of some and the strictly parasitic nature of others but he condemned the lot for their abuses of the privilege of consecration. His work is a comprehensive source of information on episcopi vagantes.

Brandreth was born in England in 1914. Graduating from Lincoln Theological College in 1940, he was ordained to the diaconate in 1942 and to the presbyterate in 1943. He was the curate of St. Ives until 1945 and of St. Barnabas, Wood End Conventional District, Northolt Park, London, until 1949. He left London for Paris in 1949 to be the chaplain of St. George's Church. In 1965 he returned as the vicar of St. Saviour, Aberdeen Park, Highbury, until his retirement in 1982. During this period he also served as guild vicar of St Dunstan-in-the-West, London, from 1970 to 1976 and priest in charge from 1976 to 1978. In 1970 he was asked to sit on the Church of England's Council on Foreign Relations in the position of associate secretary. He remained on the council until 1974.

Little documentation is available on Brandreth's private life. He never married, devoting himself entirely to the church. As is apparent in his papers, his interest in episcopi vagantes began while he was still in college and continued well after the publication of the second edition of Episcopi Vagantes and the Anglican Church in 1961. His contribution to the body of theological literature, however, was not limited to his work on these wandering bishops.

Brandreth died at Ealing Abbey Nursing Home, London, on 31 October 1984. His funeral, attended by many renowned Anglican, Roman Catholic and Orthodox scholars, was held at St Silas' Church, Pentonville. His ashes were later interred in the Brandreth family vault beneath the high altar of All Saints' Church, Houghton Regis, Bedfordshire.

== Bibliography ==
- A History of the Oratory of the Good Shepherd (no date)
- Celibacy and Marriage: A Study in Clerical Vocation (1944)
- Unity and Reunion: A Bibliography (1945)
- Episcopi Vagantes and the Anglican Church (1947, 1961)
- The Œcumenical Ideals of the Oxford Movement (SPCK, 1947)
- Unity and Reunion: A Bibliography second edition with supplement (1948)
- Anglicanism in France: A Brief Account of St. George's Paris (1949)
- Dr Lee of Lambeth: A Chapter in Parenthesis in the History of the Oxford Movement (SPCK, 1951)
- An Outline Guide to the Study of Eastern Christendom (SPCK, 1951)
- Huysmans (New York: Hillary House Publishers, 1963)
- (contributor) Concerning the Ordination of Women (World Council of Churches, 1964)
- (contributor) Anglican Initiatives in Christian Unity: Lectures Delivered in Lambeth Palace Library 1966 (London: SPCK, 1967)
