= Havergal College =

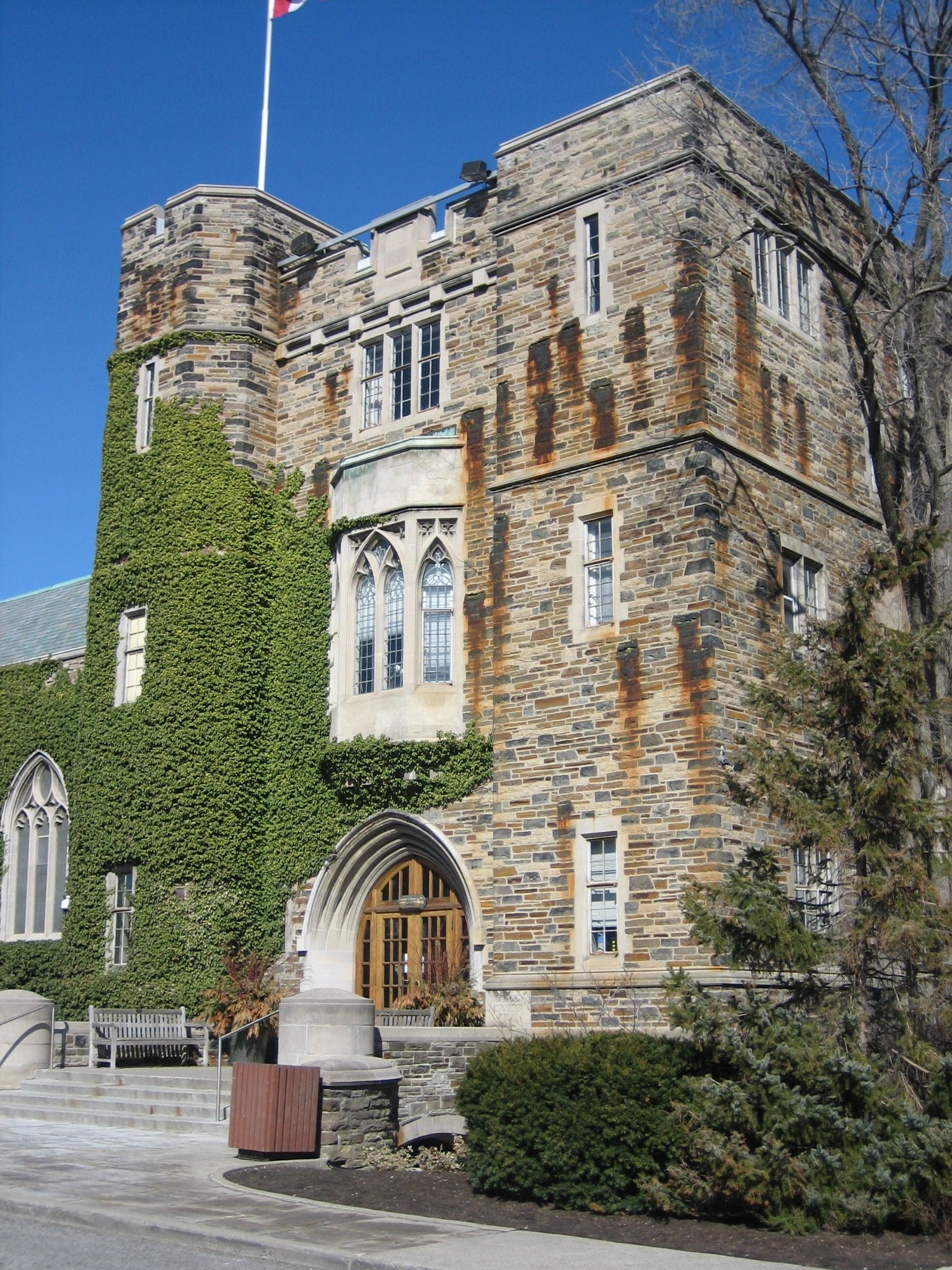

Location
- 1451 Avenue Road; Toronto, Ontario, M5N 2H9; Canada; 43°43′12″N 79°24′51″W

Information
- School type: Independent day and boarding
- Religious affiliation: Anglican
- Founded: 1894
- Principal: Katrina Samson
- Grades: JK–12
- Gender: Girls
- Enrollment: 920 (2012–2013)
- Language: English
- Area: Lytton Park
- Colours: Green and Gold
- Mascot: HaverGator
- Team name: Havergal Gators
- Website: www.havergal.on.ca

Havergal College is a private day and boarding school for girls from Junior Kindergarten to Grade 12 in Toronto, Ontario, Canada. The school was established in 1894 and named for Frances Ridley Havergal, a composer, author and humanitarian.

The 22-acre (8.9 ha) campus is located at 1451 Avenue Road, at the corner of Avenue Road and Lawrence Avenue in midtown Toronto. Facilities include an Upper School, an athletic centre with a pool and fitness center, music studios, a theatre, computer labs and a Junior School.

In 2012, Havergal's elementary school was ranked first by the Fraser Institute amongst Toronto schools, receiving a "perfect score of 10". In 2015, Havergal's secondary school was ranked second by the Fraser Institute amongst 749 Ontario secondary schools.

== History ==
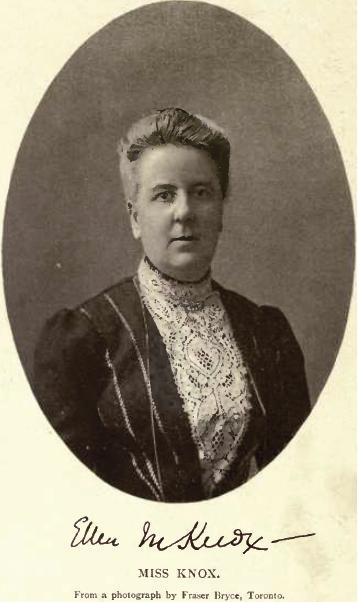
Ellen Mary Knox, first principal of Havergal College

Havergal was founded in 1894 as a Church of England Ladies' College, under principal Ellen Mary Knox. She held a first-class in the final honour examination at the University of Oxford, a Cambridge University diploma in teaching, and a First Division Government certificate. Havergal was the sister school of Ridley College for the first several decades of the schools' history.

In the spring of 1894, a school for girls at 350 Jarvis Street was about to close its doors, and a group of men led by The Honourable H. Blake formed an organization for taking over the building and making it the home of what became Havergal College. The group of men who founded Havergal College had great faith in the future of Canada and wanted to provide a sound academic education for their daughters. Being members and strong followers of the Anglican Church of Canada, they established the continuing policy of having its beliefs and teachings in their school. Miss Ellen Mary Knox was the First Principal of the school. She was a graduate of Oxford University, a teacher at Cheltenham Ladies College in England, a devout member of the Church and Principal of Havergal College for 30 years. The school cared about the education of women long before most women began to take themselves seriously.

— Catherine Steele 1928, M.A., D.Litt. D.S. Litt.

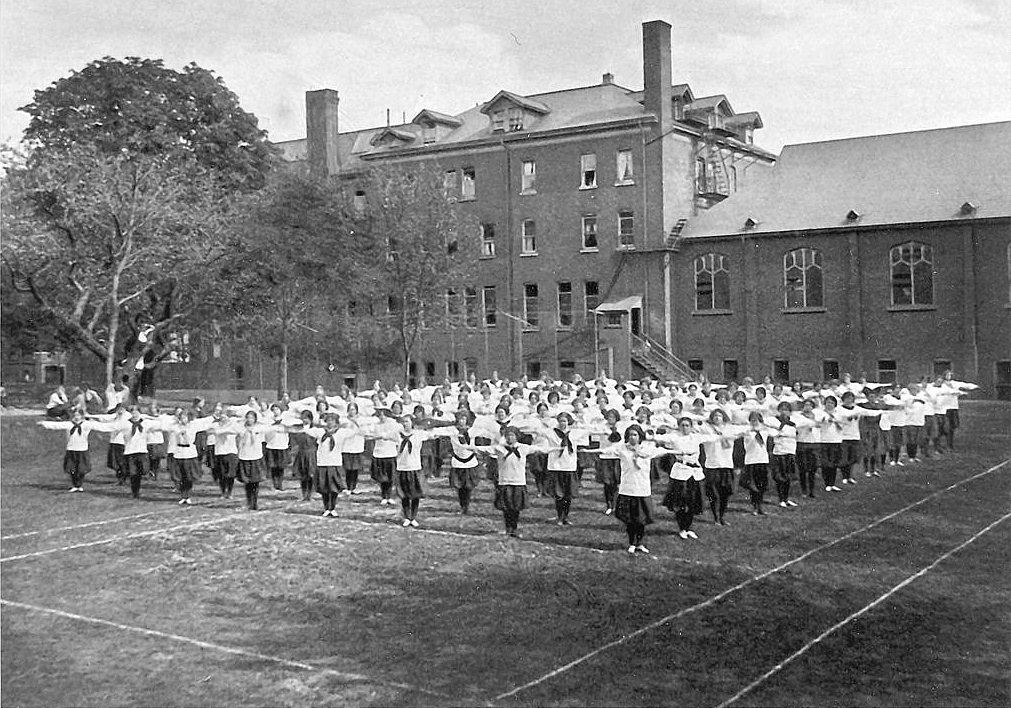
Gymnastics display at Havergal's Jarvis Street campus, 1908

In 1898, a new building was constructed for the school at 354 Jarvis Street. By 1903, Havergal College had 120 boarders and 200 day girls, a staff of 20 resident teachers (mostly from English universities) and a number of nonresident visiting teachers. The former Havergal Ladies' College building at 354 Jarvis Street is now the Margaret McCain Academic Building at the National Ballet School of Canada.

== Symbols ==
The Havergal Crest, comprising maple leaves, laurel branches, a torch, and a lamp of learning, symbolizes the school motto of Vitai Lampada Tradens — passing on the torch of life.

The marguerite was chosen as the school flower "because it grew so cheerily wherever its luck found it, and because it looked up so steadily at the light that its heart was pierced with purest gold, its petals the purest white." (First Principal Ellen Knox)

Havergal College's official mascot is the HaverGator, an alligator dressed in the Havergal school uniform. The HaverGator, known as "Allie Gator" amongst Havergal students, represents the Havergal Athletics program and school spirit.

== Upper School (US) ==
The Upper School refers to both the Middle School and the Senior School (together, grades 7 to 12) and is located at 1451 Avenue Road. The building was completed in 1926.

=== Upper School curriculum ===
The Liberal Arts program exceeds the expectations of the Ontario Ministry of Education. All courses are college-preparatory and are at the advanced level. A credit is granted with the successful completion of a course for which a minimum of 110 hours has been scheduled. Many students choose to write Advanced Placement exams. Upon graduation, students receive the Ontario Secondary School Diploma.

=== Languages ===
The Languages Department at Havergal offers courses in French, Spanish, Latin, and Mandarin.

=== Technological education ===
Students learn the fundamentals of web design, video and multimedia production, animation, and graphic design. Courses provide the opportunity to explore current industry-standard software, including PhotoShop, InDesign, GoLive, Final Cut Pro, DVD Studio Pro, Soundtrack, LiveType, Motion, Dreamweaver, Flash, and Microsoft Office.

== Advanced Placement ==
The Advanced Placement (AP) Program gives students exposure to university-level material and, in some cases, credit towards university courses, and helps students acquire the skills and habits they will need for success at university. Havergal offers Advanced Placement courses in biology, calculus, Mandarin, statistics, French, seminar, and research.

== Boarding school ==
The boarding school is a residence for approximately 50 students (Grades 9 to 12), representing countries all over the globe. Fully integrated in the life of the school and with day students, boarding students participate in life skills programming, recreational programming and The Duke of Edinburgh's Award, in addition to the curricular and co-curricular programs. The boarding school also hosts exchange students for several weeks each term from partner schools located in six countries.

== Bullying controversy ==
In May 2020, the school was the defendant in a lawsuit filed by a student of the school and her mother alleging 'relentless' bullying, both digitally and in person, that the school did not prevent, seeking $38 million in damages.

This is not the first time the school has been the subject of lawsuits about failing to prevent bullying, with a $5.5 million lawsuit filed in November 2019 after the school allegedly expelled the victim in question, following her parents complaints. A report by York University psychology professor Debra Pepler claimed that bullying was a "significant, systemic problem" at the school (the report was commissioned by the victim's father). As part of the latter case, allegations of racism were made (the victim in question is of Asian heritage).

== Notable alumni ==
- Gillian Apps 2001 – Canadian women's hockey team; 2006, 2010, & 2014 Olympic gold medallist
- Carolyn Bennett 1968 – Liberal MP and federal Minister of Crown-Indigenous Relations (2015-2021)
- Rachel Blanchard 1994 – actress
- Lois Butler 1913 - Olympic skier, aviator and one of the first women pilots of the Air Transport Auxiliary.
- Paula Cox 1976 — Premier of Bermuda
- Eileen de Villa – Chief Medical Officer of Health of Toronto
- Frances Drake – actress of the 1930s
- Frieda Fraser – physician
- Linda Frum 1981 – journalist, Canadian Senator of Ontario
- Faith Goldy – far-right white nationalist political commentator
- Margot Kidder 1966 – actress
- Margaret McCain 1951 – 27th Lieutenant-Governor of New Brunswick
- Dora Mavor Moore 1899 – Canadian theatre pioneer
- Claire Mowat - writer and environmentalist
- Lana Ogilvie 1986 – model, businesswoman
- Alexandra Orlando 2005 – rhythmic gymnast and Olympian
- Indrani Pal-Chaudhuri 1992 — model, director, and photographer
- Quinn 2013 – Canadian Women's soccer Olympic gold medalist (2021)
- Kate Reid 1949 – actress
- Georgina Reilly 1986 – actress
- Sarah Richardson 1989 – Canadian interior designer
- Susan Swan 1963 - author, journalist, performance artist, and professor of creative writing
- Mariko Tamaki 1993 — writer of graphic novels
- Jane Urquhart 1967 – author
- Kristina Valjas 2005 — Canadian women's beach volleyball (Olympian)

== Notable faculty ==
- Mabel Allington Royds, English woodcut artist
- Ann Peel – director of the Institute at Havergal
- Bryon Wilfert – Honorary Consul for the Republic of the Union of Myanmar, Former Liberal MP.

== House system ==
The house system forms the basis for organization in the school. The Houses have been named for women who have contributed to the welfare of Havergal.

House name	Colours	Mascot
Agnes Hansen	Pink & White	Panther
Catherine Steele	Purple & Silver	Unicorn
Edith Nainby	Red & White	Lion
Ellen Knox	Green & White	Frog
Frances Ridley	Black, Orange & White	Penguin
Kate Leonard	Baby Blue & White	Elephant
Marcelle De Freitas	Royal Blue & Silver	Dolphin
Margaret Taylor	Orange & Dark Blue	Butterfly
Marian Wood	Yellow & Black	Bumblebee
Mary Dennys	Teal & Gold	Dragon

The House system recognizes the contributions of ten women to the life of the school, and provides a link between students and Old Girls.

== Affiliations ==
- Canadian Accredited Independent Schools (CAIS)
- Conference of Independent Schools (CIS)
- The Association of Boarding Schools (TABS)
- National Association of Independent Schools (NAIS)
- CIS eLearning Consortium (CISELC)
- Conference of Independent Schools Athletics Association (CISAA)

== See also ==
- Education in Ontario
- List of secondary schools in Ontario
