= Winifred Peck =

English novelist and biographer

Winifred Frances Peck (née Knox; 14 September 1882 – 20 November 1962), styled Lady Peck from 1938, was an English novelist and biographer.

== Early life and education ==
Winifred was born in 1882 at 8 Merton Street, Oxford, the youngest child of Rev. Edmund Arbuthnott Knox and Ellen Penelope French, daughter of the missionary Rev. Valpy French. Her father was a fellow at Merton College, Oxford at the time of her birth and later was the fourth Bishop of Manchester (1903–1921). Her father was of Ulster Scots descent.

Knox was one of the first 40 pupils to attend Wycombe Abbey School, and she went on to read Modern History at Lady Margaret Hall, Oxford.

== Career ==
Knox's first book, written in 1909, was a biography of Louis IX.

Ten years after writing her first book, Winifred Peck began a novel-writing career which saw the publication of twenty-five books over a period of forty years, including House-bound (1942), which was reprinted in 2007 by Persephone Books. She also wrote two books on the subject of her own childhood, A Little Learning (1952) and Home for the Holidays (1955).

Peck was the sister of E. V. Knox, editor of Punch; Ronald Knox, theologian and writer; Dilly Knox, cryptographer; Wilfred Lawrence Knox, clergyman; and Ethel Knox. Her niece was the Booker Prize-winning author Penelope Fitzgerald who wrote a biography of her father, E. V. Knox, and her uncles, entitled The Knox Brothers.

== Personal life ==
In 1911, Knox married civil servant James Peck. They had three sons (the second predeceased his parents). When her husband was awarded a knighthood in 1938 she assumed the title of Lady Peck.

Lady Peck died in 1962.

== Books ==
In her Who's Who entry, Peck listed the following books by her:

- The Court of a Saint (1909)
- Twelve Birthdays (1918)
- The Closing Gates (1922)
- A Patchwork Tale (1925) (Note: Listed by mistake as The Patchwork Quilt)
- The King of Melido (1927)
- A Change of Master (1928)
- The Warrielaw Jewel (1933)
- The Skirts of Time (1935)
- The Skies are Falling (1936)
- They Come, They Go (1937)
- Coming Out (1938)
- Let Me Go Back (1940)
- Bewildering Cares (1940)
- A Garden Enclosed (1941)
- Housebound (1942)
- Tranquillity (1943)
- There is a Fortress (1945)
- Through Eastern Windows (1947)
- Veiled Destinies (1948)
- Arrest the Bishop (1949)
- A Clear Dawn (1949)
- Facing South (1950)
- Unseen Array (1951)
- Winding Ways (1952)
- A Little Learning (1952)
- Home for the Holidays (1955)

== Notes and references ==
Notes
