= David Richard Davies =

David Richard Davies (1889 – 1 November 1958) was Christian minister and writer.

His father was a coal miner, an occupation he followed until he became a Free Church minister. Upon the outbreak of the 1926 General Strike, Davies ceased to be a minister and became a political activist and journalist. He was also a combatant in the Spanish Civil War.

After the publication of his theological work, On To Orthodoxy, Davies was ordained as an Anglican priest in 1940 by the Archbishop of York, William Temple.

== Works ==
- On To Orthodoxy (1939; 1948).
- The Two Humanities (1940).
- The Church and the Peace (1940).
- Down Peacock's Feathers: Studies in the Contemporary Significance of the General Confession (1942).
- Secular Illusion or Christian Realism (1942; 1948).
- Divine Judgement in Human History (1943).
- Religion and Nationality (1944).
- Reinhold Niebuhr: Prophet from America (1945).
- The World We Have Forgotten (1946).
- The Sin of Our Age (1947).
- Theology and the Atomic Age (1947).
- Thirty Minutes to Raise the Dead: Sermons (1949).
- The Art of Dodging Repentance (1952).
- Communism and God (1954).
- Communism and the Christian (1954).
- In Search of Myself (1961).
