= Viscount of Arbuthnott =

Scottish title peerage

Viscountcy of Arbuthnott
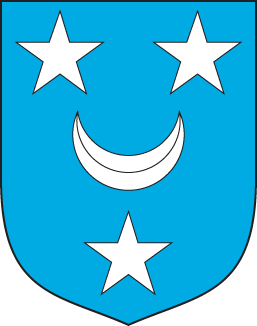
- Azure, a crescent between three mullets argent
- Creation date: 16 November 1641
- Created by: King Charles I
- Peerage: Peerage of Scotland
- First holder: Robert Arbuthnott
- Present holder: Keith Arbuthnott, 17th Viscount of Arbuthnott
- Heir apparent: Christopher Keith Arbuthnott, Master of Arbuthnott
- Remainder to: the 1st Viscount's heirs male of the body lawfully begotten
- Subsidiary titles: Lord Inverbervie; Master of Arbuthnott; Chief of the Name and Arms of Arbuthnott
- Seat: Arbuthnott House
- Motto: Laus Deo "Praise to God"

Viscount of Arbuthnott is a title in the Peerage of Scotland. It was created in 1641, along with the subsidiary title Lord Inverbervie, for Sir Robert Arbuthnott. The Viscount of Arbuthnott is the hereditary chief of Clan Arbuthnott.

At the time of the 16th Viscount's death in 2012, the family held the genealogical record of being one of an unbroken male line living in the same spot for more than 800 years. Around 1188, William the Lion granted ancestor Hugh de Swinton the lands of Arbuthnott, where the family estate and clan association headquarters remain to this day.

All Scottish viscounts have 'of' in their titles, contrary to English viscounts who are styled simply 'Viscount X'. However, most Scottish viscounts have now adopted the English practice; only the Viscount of Arbuthnott and, to a lesser extent, the Viscount of Oxfuird, continue to use 'of'.

The family seat is Arbuthnott House, Arbuthnott, near Inverbervie in Kincardineshire, although the current Viscount and his wife do not live there. Rather, the heir apparent and his family live within the Arbuthnott House.

== Viscounts of Arbuthnott (1641) ==
- Robert Arbuthnot, 1st Viscount of Arbuthnott (d. 1655)
- Robert Arbuthnot, 2nd Viscount of Arbuthnott (d. 1682)
- Robert Arbuthnot, 3rd Viscount of Arbuthnott (1663–1694)
- Robert Arbuthnot, 4th Viscount of Arbuthnott (1686–1710)
- John Arbuthnot, 5th Viscount of Arbuthnott (1692–1756)
- John Arbuthnot, 6th Viscount of Arbuthnott (aka the Rich Lord). (1703–1791) Son of John Arbuthnot of Fordoun, brother of the 2nd Viscount. Father of 7th Viscount.
- John Arbuthnot, 7th Viscount of Arbuthnott (1754–1800) Challenged the legality of his late father's actions, which had included the granting of leases for long periods at low rents."
- John Arbuthnott, 8th Viscount of Arbuthnott (1778–1860)
- John Arbuthnott, 9th Viscount of Arbuthnott (1806–1891)
- John Arbuthnott, 10th Viscount of Arbuthnott (1843–1895)
- David Arbuthnott, 11th Viscount of Arbuthnott (1845–1914)
- William Arbuthnott, 12th Viscount of Arbuthnott (1849–1917)
- Walter Charles Warner Arbuthnott, 13th Viscount of Arbuthnott (1847–1920)
- John Ogilvy Arbuthnott, 14th Viscount of Arbuthnott (1882–1960)
- (Robert) Keith Arbuthnott, 15th Viscount of Arbuthnott (1897–1966)
- John Campbell Arbuthnott, KT, CBE, DSC, 16th Viscount of Arbuthnott (1924–2012)
- (John) Keith Oxley Arbuthnott, 17th Viscount of Arbuthnott (b. 1950)

The heir apparent is the present holder's only son, the Hon. Christopher Keith Arbuthnott, Master of Arbuthnott (b. 1977).
The heir apparent's heir apparent is his only son, Alexander Nicholas Keith Arbuthnott (b. 2007).

== Coat of arms ==
Coat of arms of Arms of Viscount of Arbuthnott
Coronet Coronet of Viscount Crest A peacock's head couped proper, beaked or Escutcheon Azure a crescent between three mullets argent Supporters Two wyverns, wings expanded, tails nowed vert, spouting fire proper Motto Laus Deo ("Praise to God") Badge A peacock's head couped at the neck issuant from a chaplet of peacocks' feathers all proper, banded at the base with a riband azure doubled argent and ensigned of a viscounts coronet

== See also ==
- Clan Arbuthnott
- Arbuthnot baronets
