= Ontario Veterinary College =

Oldest veterinary school in Canada

Coordinates: 43.53115°N 80.23233°W

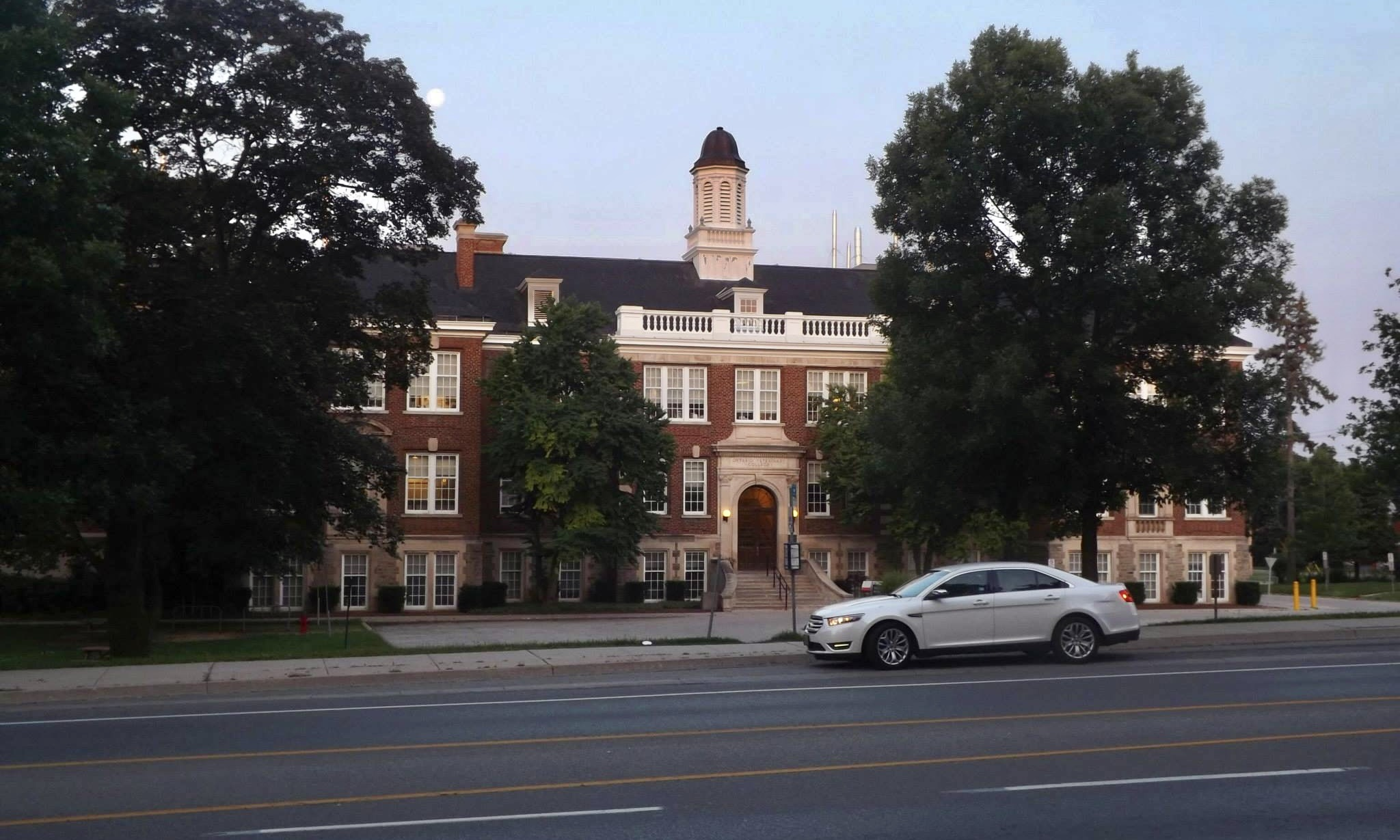
- Main building for the College in 2015
- Motto: Opus veterinum civibus (Latin)
- Motto in English: "The Craft of the Veterinarian is for the Good of the Nation"
- Type: Public
- Established: 1862; 164 years ago
- Parent institution: University of Guelph
- Dean: Jeffrey Wichtel
- Location: Guelph, Ontario, Canada
- Website: uoguelph.ca/ovc

The Ontario Veterinary College (OVC) is the oldest veterinary school in Canada. It is located on the campus of the University of Guelph in Guelph, Ontario. The OVC is one of five veterinary schools that offer the Doctor of Veterinary Medicine, DVM program in Canada. The program is highly competitive and only admits a select number of applicants each year. The OVC was ranked 1st in Canada and 5th in the world for veterinary medicine by the QS World University Rankings 2020.

== History ==
Originally called Upper Canada Veterinary School, the Ontario Veterinary College was established in Toronto in 1862, by the Scots Andrew Smith (veterinary surgeon) with some assistance from Duncan McNab McEachran, both graduates of the Royal School of Veterinary Studies at the University of Edinburgh. The college adopted the current name in 1867, the year of Canada's Confederation. McEachran was a staff member but he considered the admission standards and academic requirements to be inadequate. He left after three years, moving to Montreal where he helped establish Montreal Veterinary College.

The school's first classes took place at 188 King Street West in 1861 and then at Agricultural Hall at Yonge and Queen Streets in 1862. The first permanent site of the school was at Bay Street and Temperance Street in 1870 and University Avenue in 1914. By 1897, the college was affiliated with the University of Toronto and in 1908 it was acquired from Smith by the government of Ontario.

It later moved to Guelph, Ontario (1922) and remained affiliated with the University of Toronto until it became a founding college of the University of Guelph in 1964. In 1928 Miss E. B. Carpenter from Detroit was the first woman to graduate from a Canadian veterinary college. She was accepted to the school in 1923, one year after the Sex Disqualification (Removal) Act allowed Miss Aleen Cust to complete her exams at the Royal College of Veterinary Surgeons. The first woman to graduate from OVC was Dr. G. E. Fritz from New York, the first Canadian woman to graduate from OVC or any other Canadian veterinary college was Jean Rumney in 1939 and the second was Edith Williams in 1941, also a graduate of OVC. Today the majority of Canadian veterinary school graduates are women.

In 1964 it became a founding college of the University of Guelph. The college severed ties with University of Toronto and its principal became the dean of the college. The OVC celebrated its 150th anniversary in 2012.

== About ==
The Ontario Veterinary College is the only veterinary college in the province of Ontario, and the oldest of only five current veterinary colleges across Canada. In the 2020 World University Rankings, the Ontario Veterinary College was ranked as the top veterinary school in Canada and 5th in the world. The other four veterinary schools in Canada are at the Université de Montréal, University of Prince Edward Island, the University of Saskatchewan and the University of Calgary. The University of Calgary, which opened in 2008, is the youngest of the five.

== Changes ==
In February 2008, OVC was granted $9.5 million from the province of Ontario. The intent was to help the college develop a primary-care teaching hospital for small animals.

The Hill's Primary Healthcare Centre opened during the summer of 2010 as a veterinary clinic and an educational facility for all veterinary students. A new state-of-the-art Pathobiology building opened in the fall of 2010. A new large animal isolation facility serves to treat equine patients at high-risk for infectious disease.

In March 2016, the provincial government announced a $23 million grant to add a new building and to renovate the animal hospital. The plan was to add new classrooms and labs, to install new equipment and to improve biosecurity and infection control.

== Campus ==
The OVC is located on 213,000 square meters of the University of Guelph campus in Guelph, Ontario. The main OVC building (including classrooms, laboratories, and the Dean's Office) is located at the intersection of Gordon St. and College Ave. in Guelph. The Health Science Centre is located at 28 College Ave, and the Animal Health Lab is located at 419 Gordon St. The College also maintains multiple horse fields and stables, a dairy barn, and a large-animal isolation facility within its campus. F

== Academics ==
OVC offers a bachelor's degree in bio-medical science, but its primary degree offering is the DVM (Doctor of Veterinary Medicine). The College also offers DVSc, PhD, MSc, MPH, and Diploma programs at the graduate level. The DVM program is one of the most competitive in the world. The annual number of places available in the Doctor of Veterinary Medicine (DVM) program is 120 seats with 105 for Canadians with Ontario residency and 15 for non-Canadians.

== Student life ==
120 student veterinarians are admitted to the school each year after successfully passing the highly competitive application and interview processes. Student veterinarians can usually be found studying in the Lifetime Learning Centre, having a coffee in the Pathobiology building, or playing hockey at the Gryphon Centre. OVC students are encouraged to join a wide array of clubs and organizations, including Diagnostic Imaging, Parasitology, Surgery, 3D printing club, among others. In Phase One, student veterinarians are invited to a 'Blue Coat Ceremony', where they will be gifted their blue lab coats by the university and officially welcomed to the veterinary profession. This signifies the start of their journey to becoming a veterinarian. This event is only trumped by the coveted 'White Coat Ceremony' at the end of Phase Three. The white coat ceremony signifies a student's transition from class-based learning to clinical rotations. A beloved tradition at OVC is the naming of each class with a mascot and a colour. This mascot represents the class throughout the four phases, and is used regularly in conjunction with not only academics, but also intramural sports. Hockey plays a large part in these intramurals, with rivalries coming to a head in a college-wide "Challenge Cup" tournament, held each year in March.

Past Classes have included:

- The 2000 Green Dragons,
- The 2001 Purple Otters,
- The 2002 Silver Polar Bears,
- The 2003 Cougars,
- The 2004 Falcons,
- The 2005 Red Foxes,
- The 2006 Silver Broncos
- The 2007 Golden Grizzlies
- The 2008 Blue Qimmiqs
- The 2009 Jade Jaguars
- The 2010 Crimson Crocodiles
- The 2011 Black Mambas
- The 2012 Silver Foxes
- The 2013 Golden Phoenixes
- The 2014 Emerald Elephants
- The 2015 Scarlet Stags
- The 2016 Cobalt Caracals
- The 2017 Violet Komodos
- The 2018 Ivory Owls
- The 2019 Golden Krakens
- The 2020 Ruby Rhinos
- The 2021 Sapphire Snow Leopards
- The 2022 Jade Jackals
- The 2023 Opal Otters
- The 2024 Topaz Turtles
- The 2025 Amethyst Orcas

Current Classes are:

- The 2026 Turquoise Tigers
- The 2027 Emerald Elk
- The 2028 Garnet Grizzlies
- The 2029 Wisteria Wolves

=== Challenge Cup ===
For more than 100 years, hockey has been woven into the fabric of student life at the OVC. This tradition began in Toronto with games against University of Toronto colleges before moving to Guelph in 1922, where student veterinarians took on city leagues and their peers at the OAC. The modern era of OVC hockey took shape in 1931 when Principal Charles D. McGilvray established an annual inter-year tournament and donated an inaugural shield trophy—a prize that was officially dubbed the Challenge Cup in the 1970s. In 2012, the hardware got an upgrade when Dr. Brad Hanna (Class of '89) donated a new silver bowl trophy. While the OVC hockey scene has grown to include women’s, co-ed, and faculty matchups, the Challenge Cup itself remains the exclusive, hard-fought prize for inter-year competition.

Recent Winners:
Year/League	Co-ed	Women's
2015/16	2016 Cobalt Caracals	2016 Cobalt Caracals
2016/17	2018 Ivory Owls	2016 Violet Komodos 2019 Golden Krakens
2018/19	2021 Sapphire Snow Leopards	2019 Golden Krakens
2019/20	2021 Sapphire Snow Leopards	2021 Sapphire Snow Leopards
2024/25	2025 Amethyst Orcas	2027 Emerald Elk
2025/26	2028 Garnet Grizzlies	2027 Emerald Elk

== Notable professors ==
Dr. W. J. R. Fowler taught equine surgery, materia medica, sporadic diseases, and lameness in horses. Fowler was recognized internationally, and had already taught at Ontario Veterinary College for over 55 years under 5 principles.

Dr. F. W. Schofield taught pathology, parasitology and bacteriology. He was also a missionary, travelling around the world preaching Christianity in his off time.

Dr. Ronald G. Watkin taught bacteriology, milk hygiene, and diseases in poultry. He was an acclaimed research scientist. Ronald retired with Dr. Scofield in 1955.

Principal Charles D. McGilvray was the 3rd principal of the school from 1918 to 1945. He taught contagious diseases, special therapeutics, and sanitary service subjects. He obtained the nickname "Shot-gun Charlie" from his handling of Glanders Disease in Manitoba between 1905 and 1910.

Dr. Scott Weese is a Professor in the Department of Pathobiology at the Ontario Veterinary College, and Chief of Infection Control at the OVC Teaching Hospital. He is a member of the Ontario COVID-19 Science Advisory Table, and a Fellow with the Canadian Academy of Health Sciences (CAHS).

== See also ==
- College of Veterinarians of Ontario
- University of Guelph
