= John Arbuthnott, 8th Viscount of Arbuthnott =

Scottish peer and soldier

John Arbuthnott, 8th Viscount of Arbuthnott DL FRSE
- Coat of Arms of the Viscounts of Arbuthnott

Rector of King's College, Aberdeen
- In office 1827–1837

Lord Lieutenant of Kincardineshire
- In office 1805–1847
- Preceded by: Anthony Keith-Falconer, 5th Earl of Kintore
- Succeeded by: Sir Thomas Burnett, 8th Baronet

Personal details
- Born: 16 January 1778
- Died: 10 January 1860 (aged 81) Bruges, Belgium
- Children: John Arbuthnott, 9th Viscount of Arbuthnott
- Parent: John Arbuthnott, 7th Viscount of Arbuthnott (father)

Military service
- Rank: Captain
- Unit: 7th Dragoon Guards (Princess Royal's); 52nd Regiment of Foot

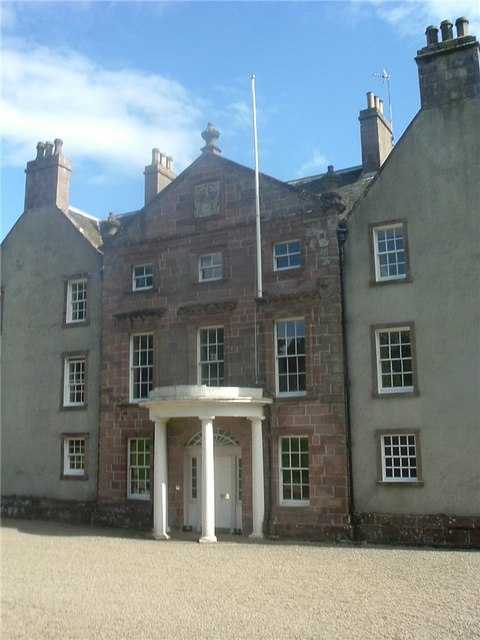
Arbuthnott House, Kincardineshire

John Arbuthnott, 8th Viscount of Arbuthnott DL FRSE (16 January 1778 – 10 January 1860) was a Scottish peer and soldier. Known as "the rich Lord" he built the bridge in front of Arbuthnott House, Kincardineshire. He was the first member of the family who consistently spelled his name "Arbuthnott" rather than "Arbuthnot".

== Life ==
He was the son of the 7th Viscount Arbuthnott and Isabella Graham.

He served in the 7th Dragoon Guards (Princess Royal's) and the 52nd Regiment of Foot, reaching the rank of Captain. On 27 February 1800, he succeeded to his father's titles. Arbuthnot was Lord Lieutenant of Kincardineshire from 1805 to 1847, and Lord Rector of King's College, Aberdeen from 1827 to 1837.

He had long service in the House of Lords as a Scottish representative peer between 1818 and 1820, and between 1821 and 1847. He fell from a horse in 1829 and suffered a severe head injury. As a consequence in 1848 he was prosecuted for fraud, forgery and uttering and, although the family paid his debts, the Viscount left Scotland, never to return; his heir ran the estate from 1850. He is thought to have died in Bruges.

== Positions held ==
- Lord Lieutenant of Kincardineshire (1805–1847)
- Rector of King's College, Aberdeen (1827–1835)

== Publications ==
- On The Potato Disease, Crop 1845 (an account of the beginnings of the Highland Potato Famine)

== Family ==
On 25 June 1805, he married Margaret Ogilvy, daughter of Walter Ogilvy, 8th Earl of Airlie. They had six sons, and seven daughters:

- John Arbuthnott, 9th Viscount of Arbuthnott (4 Jun 1806 – 26 May 1891)
- Hon. Jane Ogilvy (9 Aug 1807 - 22 Oct 1900) married Capt. James Cheape. They had no known issue.
- Hon. Walter (21 Nov 1808 – 5 Jan 1891) married Anna Maria Ottley. They had a son, the future Walter Charles Warner Arbuthnott, 13th Viscount of Arbuthnott, and Kathleen Georgina.
- Hon. Margaret (6 Feb 1810 – 4 March 1845) married William James Lumsden. They had known issue.
- Hon. Isabella Mary (5 June 1811 - 13 July 1828)
- Lieutenant-Colonel Hon. Hugh (13 Aug 1812 – 5 Feb 1866) married Susannah Morrison Campbell. They had two sons.
- Hon. Anne Charlotte (17 Nov 1813 - 14 May 1914)
- Hon. Helen (10 Apr 1815 – 23 Apr 1840). She married Frederick Lewis Scrymgeour-Wedderburn, grandson of Captain Hon. Frederick Lewis Maitland. They had one son.
- Hon. Louisa Charlotte (19 Apr 1817 - 21 Sep 1831)
- Hon. Clementina Maria (17 Aug 1818 - 23 Oct 1857). She married William Rose Campbell. They had no known issue.
- Hon. David CSI (13 Apr 1820 – 27 Jul 1901) married Elizabeth Reynolds, daughter of Dr. Thomas Forbes Reynolds. They had four sons and three daughters together. He also had three other sons before their marriage.
- Lt-Col. Hon. William Arbuthnott (18 Oct 1821 - 13 Dec 1902) married Barbara Elrington (1822-1904).
- Major Hon. Charles James Donald Arbuthnott (21 Mar 1823 - 26 Jan 1903) married 1st 1852 Carter Caroline (1814–1890), and 2nd in 1891 Annie Maria Wild (1861-1937).

== Bibliography ==
- Mrs P S-M Arbuthnot (1920). Memories of the Arbuthnots. George Allen & Unwin Ltd.
- Bing, Hon Mrs Christy (1999). The Lairds of Arbuthnott. Agnate Press. ISBN 0-9535923-0-8.

Academic offices
Unknown	Rector of King's College, Aberdeen; 1827–1837	Unknown
Honorary titles
Preceded by The Earl of Kintore	Lord Lieutenant of Kincardineshire; 1805–1847	Succeeded by Sir Thomas Burnett, Bt.
Peerage of Scotland
Preceded by John Arbuthnot	Viscount of Arbuthnott; 1800–1860	Succeeded by John Arbuthnott
