= Cubberley =

Cubberley may refer to:

- Cubberley Community Center, community center in Palo Alto, California
- David Cubberley, Canadian politician
- Ellwood Patterson Cubberley (1868–1941), American educator and author
- Elijah Cubberley Hutchinson (1855–1932), American Republican Party politician, New Jersey
- Ellwood P. Cubberley High School, one of three public high schools in Palo Alto California

== See also ==
- Coberley
- Cubley (disambiguation)
- Kaberle
