= Robbie McCauley =

American playwright and academic (1942–2021)

- Born: July 14, 1942; Norfolk, Virginia, U.S.
- Died: May 20, 2021 (aged 78); Silver Spring, Maryland, U.S.
- Education: Howard University; New York University
- Occupations: Playwright, actress, director, professor
- Employer: Emerson College
- Notable work: Sally's Rape; Sugar
- Title: Professor emerita
- Spouse: Ed Montgomery (1979–1996)
- Children: Jessie Montgomery

Robbie Doris McCauley (July 14, 1942 – May 20, 2021) was an American playwright, director, performer, and professor. McCauley is best known for her plays Sugar and Sally's Rape, among other works that addressed racism in the United States and challenged audiences to participate in dialogue with her work. She also performed in Ntozake Shange's 1976 Broadway play For Colored Girls Who Have Considered Suicide / When the Rainbow Is Enuf. McCauley was professor emerita at Emerson College, teaching there from 2001 until she retired in 2013.

== Early life ==
Robbie McCauley was born in Norfolk, Virginia, on July 14, 1942. Her parents were Robert, who spent his career in the military, and Alice (Borders) McCauley, who worked in the federal government. Robbie spent most of her younger years splitting time between Washington, D.C. and Columbus, Georgia. She earned her B.A. in 1963 from Howard University and later an M.A. from New York University.

== Career ==
In New York, McCauley became interested in both experimental and African-American theater. In the late 1960s, she worked as an apprentice at the Negro Ensemble Company in New York City. From the 1970s on she was a working playwright, director, and actress in many New York-based projects, both on and off Broadway, as well as work elsewhere in the U.S. and abroad. She performed in the ensemble of Ntozake Shange's 1976 play For Colored Girls Who Have Considered Suicide / When the Rainbow Is Enuf on Broadway. The experience inspired her to develop work about her own life. Writing in The Boston Globe, Bryan Marquand said the resulting "work repeatedly shattered the silence about issues such as race, illness, and sex."

McCauley's most acclaimed work is Sally's Rape, which won an Obie Award in 1991 for best new American play and a Bessie Award for best solo performance in 1990. Her other major works include Sugar and a trilogy: Mississippi Freedom, Turf and The Other Weapon, with the first segment playing at the 1993 Whitney Biennial. McCauley's work deals with racism in the United States, aiming to facilitate dialogues on race between races in the community. She described her ambition for her work: "that people might be able to have a good time with material that's charged and uncomfortable."

In addition to her theater work, McCauley taught at City College of New York, Hunter College, Mount Holyoke College, University of Massachusetts. She joined Emerson College—becoming its first black faculty member to receive tenure without filing a discrimination suit—and taught there from 2001 to 2013 when she took professor emerita status. McCauley was also a guest instructor at HB Studio.

== Notable works ==
=== Sally's Rape ===
Sally's Rape is a 45-minute performance art piece from 1991 that played at The Kitchen in New York City. The show was inspired by McCauley's enslaved great-great-grandmother Sally who had a child fathered by her enslaver, the product of sexual violence. In one portion of the piece, McCauley stands naked on a bench. A white woman enters and tells the audience that the bench is an auction box and encourages the audience to bid on McCauley's body—something McCauley described as a ritual intended to engage the audience with her in addressing the historical experience of African-American women who were objects of white abuse, and opening a dialogue with the audience. Reviewing the show for The Village Voice, Alissa Solomon found this objective successful: "Unlike typical attempts at audience participation, we weren't being manipulated or coerced. Instead, we were being drawn into a rehearsal, practice for a bigger project that, we understood, would have to continue outside. And, thrillingly, it did. For a couple of hours after the performance, I talked about racism with friends who'd also been at the show, looking into areas I'd never before dared to open. I can't remember the last time I left a play more filled with its questions." McCauley called the show a "work in progress", a play on words with the social progress she hoped to engender.

=== Trilogy ===
Mississippi Freedom is the first in a trilogy of theater works that McCauley created in the 1990s that highlight race relations in the US during the 1960s and '70s; this work dealt with the struggle to win voting rights. In collaboration with Arts Company as well as local artists who had personal ties to the voting rights movement, the pieces are mixed media, incorporating elements of music, audience participation, inviting viewers to stay after the show to discuss with the cast. It toured around the state of Mississippi in 1992, and was presented in New York at the Whitney Biennial in 1993, and Texas in 1996.

Turf: A Conversational Concert in Black and White, second in the trilogy, was centered around the Boston school busing controversy. After a year spent developing a show via interviews conducted around Boston, in the style of Anna Deavere Smith, Turf was performed in four different neighborhood locations around Boston in 1993.

The last piece in the trilogy is titled The Other Weapon, and tells the stories of the Black Panther Party, community empowerment, and law enforcement in Los Angeles. It was shown at four locations in LA in 1994.

=== Sugar ===
Sugar (debuted in 2012) is based on McCauley's life with juvenile diabetes, belatedly diagnosed in her twenties. McCauley describes as well as demonstrates (even drawing her own blood or pausing to inject insulin) the difficulties and complexities of living with diabetes as a black woman working in the theater. She connects the subject to slavery, through the image of sugar cane. Created later in her career, it also engages themes of sex and aging; "How silent are we women about sex after a certain age?" she asks. The premiere performance of the piece was put on by ArtsEmerson, an organization at Emerson College, directed by Maureen Shea. Reviewing the play's premier, Don Aucoin of The Boston Globe describes McCauley as "a skilled performer and raconteur who knows the subtle difference between speaking with—rather than to or at—her audience."

=== Other works ===
Indian Blood, like Sally's Rape, weaves McCauley's family history into the piece, using video to allow McCauley to portray multiple characters. First performed in 1987, the play is inspired by McCauley's grandfather. He was a part of the 10th Cavalry Regiment in the Spanish–American War, known as the buffalo soldiers as they also fought Native Americans.

Persimmon Peel was a collaboration with fellow For Colored Girls alum Laurie Carlos, "a cryptic, often poetically allusive little work" performed in Minneapolis in 1990. The two performers, reviewed as "riveting", shared fragmentary stories and memories, building up a depiction of Black life in the United States.

McCauley performed Love and Race in the United States Revisited as a work-in-progress in Hartford in 1999, soon after joining the faculty of Trinity College.

McCauley performed Jazz'n Class as her part of Badass, an evening of new works, with Magdalena Gómez and Kate Snodgrass, produced at Boston Playwrights' Theatre in 2015. This won a IRNE (Independent Reviewers of New England) Award for Solo Performance.

== Awards ==
- For Sugar: IRNE (Independent Reviewers of New England) Award for Solo Performance (2013)
- For Jazz'n Class: IRNE Award for Solo Performance (2016)
- For Sally's Rape: Obie Award, Best New American Play (1991); Bessie Award for Outstanding Achievement in Performance (1990)
- USA Ford Fellow for Theater Arts (2012)

== Personal life ==
In 1979, McCauley married Ed Montgomery, a musician, and they had a daughter, composer Jessie Montgomery. Early in their relationship, they worked together on a short-lived project called Sedition Ensemble and later Montgomery wrote music for some of McCauley's plays. They divorced in 1996.

McCauley died on May 20, 2021, in Silver Spring, Maryland, where she was living with her sister Anita Henderson. The cause was congestive heart failure. She was aged 78.
