= John Robert McLaughlin =

American historian

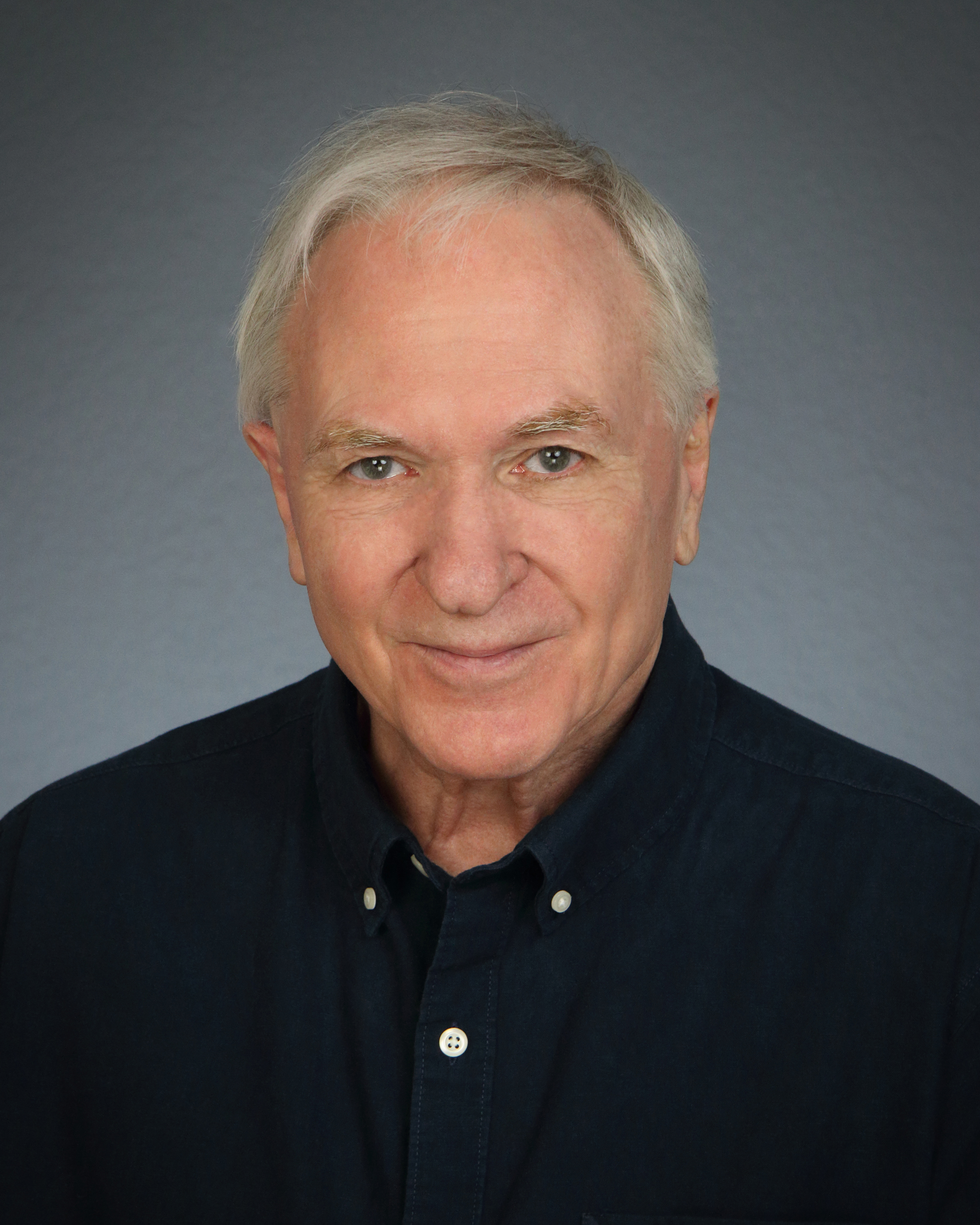
John Robert McLaughlin

John Robert McLaughlin (born February 5, 1949) is an American historian, entrepreneur, magazine and book author and publisher, documentary television producer and director. In 1994, McLaughlin founded the Santa Clara Valley Historical Association, produced and directed the 1998 PBS documentary, Silicon Valley, a One Hundred Year Renaissance, narrated by Walter Cronkite, Silicon Valley, Five Part Series, narrated by Leonard Nimoy, co-authored three popular Silicon Valley history books, conducted approximately 120 full length filmed interviews with major Silicon Valley entrepreneurs including Nobel Laureates and inventors: Hewlett, Packard, Jobs, Wozniak, including founders of Fairchild, Intel, Apple, Adobe, Nvidia, Oracle, SanDisk, Varian Medical, and Genentech. In 2020, he authored a four-hour audio course with the Great Courses for Audible, The Entrepreneurs of Silicon Valley. Often an ignored subject in life and business, McLaughlin’s interview subjects, who created thousands of jobs, innovative technologies and trillions of dollars in revenue, embraced the view that with risk comes failure. Failure is essential to success.

== Early life and education ==
McLaughlin was born in El Paso, Texas, while his father served as a U.S. Naval officer and rocket scientist at White Sands Proving Grounds outside of Las Cruces, New Mexico. He graduated from Palo Alto High School in 1967. He continued his education in political science at the University of Oregon BS 1971, and the U.S. International University, MBA, 1974.
