= Yiaway Yeh =

American politician

- 葉亞威
- Born: February 17, 1978 (age 47); San Francisco, California, United States
- Education: American University (BA); Harvard University (MPP)
- Spouse: Cecilia Hyun-Jung Mo

Yiaway Yeh (Chinese: 葉亞威; Yè Yàwēi) is former city councilmember and mayor of Palo Alto, California. He was elected to office in 2007 and was elected to mayor by the city council of Palo Alto on January 3, 2012. Yeh is the second youngest mayor in Palo Alto history and the first Taiwanese American to hold the office. He was born in San Francisco, and attended JLS Middle School and Gunn High School in Palo Alto.

Yeh received his undergraduate degree in Political Science from the American University School of Public Affairs and his graduate degree in Master of Public Policy from Harvard Kennedy School of Government.

Yeh volunteered for the Peace Corps in Burkino Faso developing local NGO's.

Before being elected Yeh was working for the City of Oakland as an auditor.

Yiaway Yeh moved to Nashville, Tennessee following his wife joining the faculty of the Department of Political Science at Vanderbilt University.

Yiaway Yeh was appointed by Mayor Karl Dean of Nashville to head up the new Mayor's Office of Innovation announced on April 26, 2013. He later took a job with Google and returned to the San Francisco Bay area.

Yeh's parents are both first generation immigrants from Taiwan that came to the U.S. for graduate school.

Of Hakka descent, Yeh's grandfather was born in Mei County, Guangdong, China in 1909 and moved to Taiwan in 1949 following the Chinese Civil War.
