= Gunn High School =

Henry M. Gunn High School
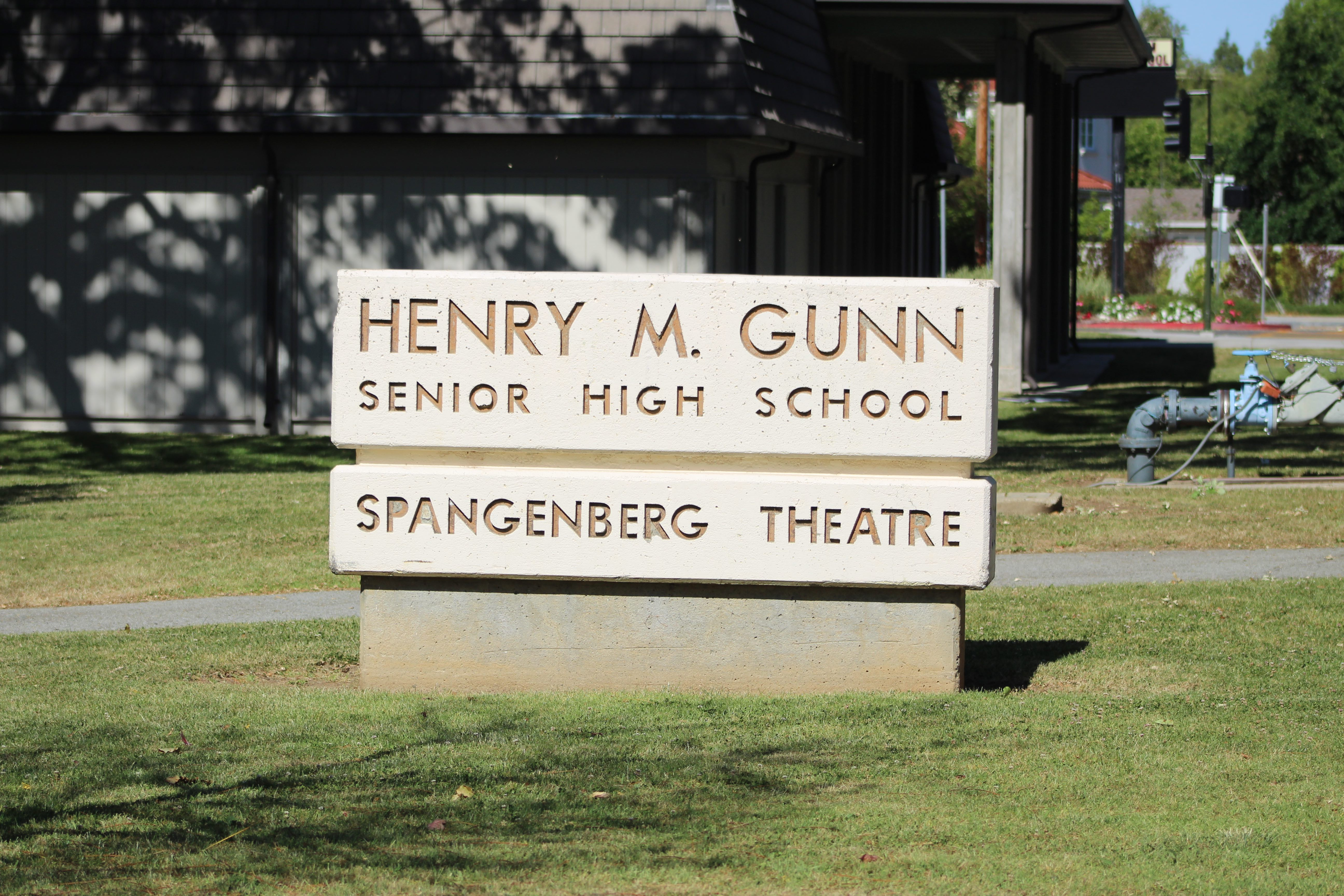

Location
- 780 Arastradero Road; Palo Alto, California 94306; United States; 37°24′10″N 122°08′02″W

Information
- School type: Public, high school
- Established: 1964; 62 years ago
- School district: Palo Alto Unified School District
- Principal: Erik Olah
- Teaching staff: 100.89 (FTE)
- Grades: 9–12
- Enrollment: 1,713 (2023-2024)
- Student to teacher ratio: 16.98
- Area: Northern Santa Clara County
- Colors: Red and Black
- Athletics conference: Santa Clara Valley Athletic League; CIF Central Coast Section
- Mascot: Timmy the Titan
- Nickname: Titans
- Accreditation: Western Association of Schools and Colleges
- Newspaper: The Oracle
- Yearbook: The Olympian
- Feeder schools: Greene Middle School, JLS Middle School, & Fletcher Middle School
- Website: gunn.pausd.org

Henry M. Gunn Senior High School is one of two public high schools in Palo Alto, California, the other being Palo Alto High School.

Established in 1964 (62 years ago), Gunn High School was named after Henry Martin Gunn, who served as the Palo Alto superintendent from 1950 to 1961. In 1964, the Palo Alto Unified School District announced that it would name the district's third high school after him. The Class of 1966 was the first class to graduate from Gunn High School. In 1992, the school was honored as a California Distinguished School.

1,606 students attended the school in the 2025–2026 school year.

== History ==
The land under Gunn High School was purchased in 1963 by the school district from Stanford University for $358,641 (equivalent to $4,247,064 in 2025), under the condition that it could not be sold to another entity. The land was originally part of Stanford's campus, but it was deeded to the Palo Alto Unified School District in 1964 for the construction of Gunn High School. Gunn High School opened in August 1964 with an initial enrollment of 600 students, comprising 300 sophomores and 300 juniors. It was named after Henry Gunn, the superintendent of the Palo Alto Unified School District from 1950 to 1961. Students were drawn from Fletcher Middle School (then called Terman Junior High School) and from the other two PAUSD high schools then open—Palo Alto High and Cubberley High. The 974-seat auditorium was named in 1965 after Karl Spangenberg, a recently deceased school district trustee. The school held its first football game in 1965, with Cubberley High. The 1966 class was first to graduate.

Gunn High School received national attention in 2009 after four of its students died of suicide over a span of seven months. Over the period of 2006–2016, the school's suicide rate was four to five times higher than the national average, with most by commuter train. In 2017, a student died of suicide. In 2024, a 16-year-old girl who was a student at the school, died of suicide. In the past decade, attempts have been made to improve the psychological health of students attending the school, with no success.

== Academics ==
Gunn offers 29 Advanced Placement (AP) classes and 16 Honors classes which are included in the weighted Grade Point Average (GPA).

In May 2023, 846 students took 2504 AP tests. 95.1% scored 3 or higher, and 52.8% scored a grade of 5. Gunn no longer ranks students, but ranking was previously recorded by decile.

Hanna Rosin wrote in a 2015 The Atlantic article that due to the emphasis on academics and competition between students, Gunn became "an extreme distillation of what parents in the meritocratic elite expect from a school." Around that time, families clamored to buy houses in Gunn's attendance boundary so their children could attend the school. According to Rosin, after a spate of suicide deaths of Gunn students in the 2010s, parents began to worry about whether the competitive atmosphere was harming students' mental well-being.

=== Mathematics ===
Gunn offers a wide selection of mathematics courses ranging from Algebra to AP Calculus BC. There are often three tracks of each subject offered: one at the college-prep level, another at the Advanced level, and one at the Honors level. Students who have completed the AP Calculus pathway before their senior year also have the opportunity to take Multivariable Calculus and Linear Algebra as a dual enrollment pathway in partnership with Foothill College. There are also three mathematics electives at Gunn: Intro to Proofs H, Applied Math H, and AP Statistics, available to juniors and seniors.

The math circle is one of the largest clubs on the Gunn High School campus, and its corresponding math team has participated in many competitions. Each year, the school has about 30 American Invitational Mathematics Examination qualifiers. After placing 15th nationally in 4 different tournaments during the 2020–21 school year, the 2021–22 math team won HMMT November and placed 4th in the Berkeley Math Tournament.

In 2023, in the context of controversial changes proposed for California's math curriculum, a group of 25 students spoke out at a Palo Alto school board meeting, urging for PAUSD to implement more fluid math lanes, offer multivariable calculus during the school day, and more. They emphasized the importance of math classes meeting the needs of all students.

=== PLTW ===
Gunn is a host to Project Lead the Way (PLTW), an organization that promotes STEM (science, technology, engineering, and math) education. Courses from this program include Digital Electronics and Introduction to Engineering Design, as well as Principles of Engineering.

== Statistics ==
=== Demographics ===
2025–2026

- 1,606 students: 859 Male (53.5%), 747 Female (46.5%), 0 Non-binary (0%),

Asian	White	Hispanic or Latino	Two or more races	African American	Filipino	Pacific Islander	Native American or Alaska Native	Unreported
777	412	211	173	17	12	2	0	2
48.4%	25.7%	13.1%	10.8%	1.1%	0.7%	0.1%	0%	0.1%

As of 2015, according to Hanna Rosin, 74% of Gunn's student body has one or more parents with a master's degree or higher, or other graduate-level degree.

=== Standardized testing ===
In 2022, students received an average ACT score of 29.2, above the state average of 23.3, and an average SAT Evidence-Based Reading and Writing score of 682 and Math score of 709, above the national and international average of 506 and 493 respectively.

2013 Academic Performance Index
2009 Base API	2013 Growth API	Growth in the API from 2009 to 2013
915	917	2

== Student groups ==
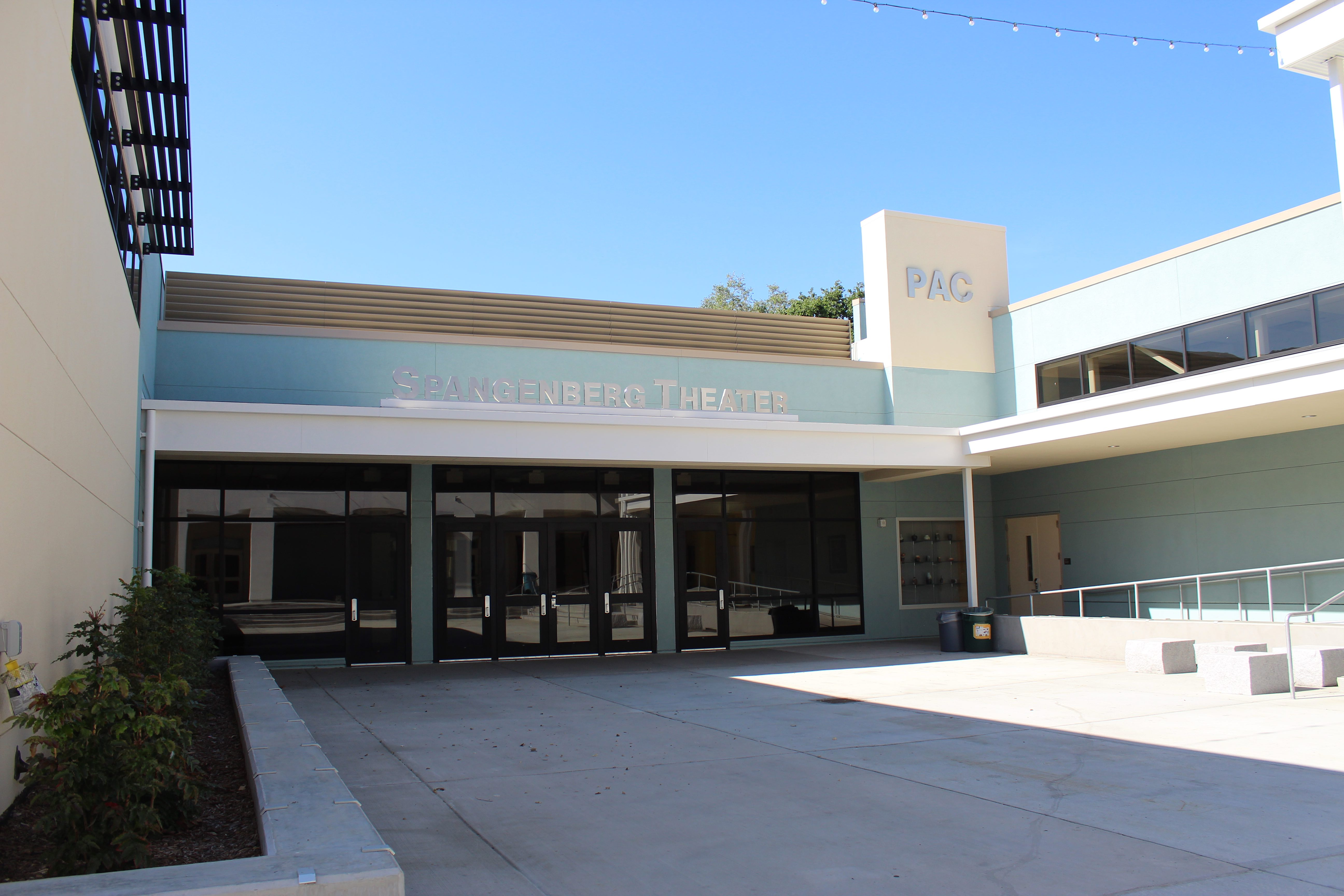
Spangenberg Theater

=== Robotics team ===
In 2012, the Robotics Team won the National FRC Championship Excellence in Design Award (3D Animation) sponsored by Autodesk. GRT is the only team that has won a total of three Animation awards in the history of FIRST.

== Notable alumni ==
- Christine Abraham (class of 1982), opera and concert mezzo-soprano and voice teacher
- Steve Almond (class of 1984), writer, The Evil B.B. Chow, Candyfreak
- Mehdi Ballouchy (class of 2002), former professional soccer player
- Raphael Bob-Waksberg (class of 2002), comedian, writer, producer, and actor; creator of BoJack Horseman
- Will Brill (class of 2004), Tony Award-winning actor
- Pedro Doria (class of 1992), Brazilian journalist
- Michelle Ellsworth (class of 1985), dancer, performance artist, and educator
- Matt Flynn (class of 1988), drummer, The B-52's, Maroon 5
- Illi Gardner (class of 2017), British professional racing cyclist
- Lisa Hanawalt, production designer and producer on BoJack Horseman
- Chris Hart (class of 2002), Japanese pop singer, songwriter, and producer
- Andrew D. Huberman, professor of neurobiology and ophthalmology at Stanford School of Medicine
- Andrew Jacobson (class of 2003), former professional soccer player
- Stephan Jenkins (class of 1983), lead singer for Third Eye Blind
- Stanley Jordan (class of 1977), jazz guitarist, Magic Touch
- Ted Kaehler (class of 1968), computer scientist
- Nina Katchadourian (class of 1985), conceptual artist
- David Leavitt (class of 1979), author, The Lost Language of Cranes, The Body of Jonah Boyd
- Michael Lederer (class of 1974), author
- Zoe Lofgren (class of 1966), representative for California's 18th congressional district, 2023–present
- Matt Marquess (class of 2004), former professional soccer player for the Kansas City Wizards
- Brian Martin (class of 1992), Olympic medal-winning luge
- Chanel Miller (class of 2010), artist, public speaker, and author of Know My Name
- Shemar Moore (class of 1988), actor, Criminal Minds, The Young and the Restless
- Ann Packer (class of 1977), author
- George Packer (class of 1978), journalist and author
- Tom E. Politzer (class of 1976), saxophonist with Tower of Power
- Rick Porras (class of 1984), film producer
- Joanne Reid (class of 2009), Olympic biathlete
- Brett Simon (class of 1992), film director, Assassination of a High School President
- Akira Tana (class of 1970), American jazz drummer
- Jacqueline Vayntrub (class of 2000), professor of Biblical Studies
- Anne Wojcicki (class of 1991), biologist, founder of 23andMe and former wife of Google founder Sergey Brin
- Susan Wojcicki (class of 1986), former CEO of YouTube
- Yiaway Yeh (class of 1996), mayor of Palo Alto, 2012
- Jessica Yu (class of 1983), Oscar-winning documentarian and film director
