= Paly =

Paly may refer to:

- In heraldry, variation of the field with a pattern of pallets (vertical bars)
- A local nickname for Palo Alto High School in Palo Alto, California, USA
