= Alarm Clock Theatre Company =

Theatre company in Boston

Alarm Clock Theatre Company is a theatre company based in Boston, Massachusetts. Their productions are semi-annual and performed at The Boston Center for the Arts Black Box Theater.

Alarm Clock Theatre's critically acclaimed play P. S. Page Me Later won the 2006 Elliot Norton Award for "Best Local Fringe Production." The play consisted of a series of short scenes, films and songs, each based on items contained in Found Magazine. It was written by thirteen separate contributors.

== Past Productions ==
Moon Man
2007 The Boston Theater Marathon
By Jami Brandli
Directed by John J. King

Bombs and Manifestos
January 5–20, 2007
By Brian James Polak
Directed by Daniel Bourque

Normal
2006 The Boston Theater Marathon
By Jami Brandli
Directed by Luke Dennis

ROSA
April 7–22, 2006
By Peter Snoad
Directed by Will Luera

P. S. Page Me Later
December 2–17, 2005
Contributing writers:
Bill Donnelly
Steve Almond
Jami Brandli
Marty Johnson
Steve Gilbane
Patrick Healy
Peter Fernandez
Karen Black
August Miller
Kristine Lambert
Mike Watson
Brian James Polak
Conceived & Directed by Sally Dennis

DUPLEX
May 26 - June 11, 2005
Book, music and lyrics by Peter Fernandez
Directed by Luke Dennis

It's Called the Sugar Plum/The Indian Wants the Bronx
December 3–18, 2004
By Israel Horovitz
Directed by Luke Dennis

With Friends Like These
2002
By Sara Adelman & Daniel Stroeh
Directed by Luke Dennis

East Lynne
2002
Adapted by [Anonymous], based on the novel by Ellen Wood
Directed by Luke Dennis

== Theatre People ==
- Luke Dennis, Founder
- Sally Dennis, Founder
- Brian James Polak, Managing Director
- Peter Fernandez, Musical Director
- Eliza Grinnell, Graphic Artist/Photographer
- Jami Brandli, Literary Manager
- Daniel Stroeh, Resident Playwright
- Anika Bachhuber, Production Manager

== See also ==
- Black box theater

== Resource & External Link ==
- Alarm Clock Theatre Company homepage
