= My Life in Heavy Metal =

Short story collection by Steve Almond

First edition

My Life in Heavy Metal is a short story collection by Steve Almond published in 2002 by Grove Press. The bulk of the stories are about young men, in their twenties exploring their lives.

== Stories ==
1. My Life in Heavy Metal - the sexual exploits of a rock critic who attends a Metallica concert at which "the bassist introduces himself by farting into his microphone"
2. Among the Ik - a widowed anthropology professor remembers a dead student
3. Geek Player, Love Slayer
4. The Last Single Days of Don Victor Potapenko - the comical adventures of an aging lothario
5. Run Away, My Pale Love
6. The Law of Sugar
7. The Pass
8. Moscow
9. Valentino - Iowa teenage boys talk about beauty and love
10. How to Love a Republican
11. Pornography
12. The Body in Extremis

== Critical response ==
The Guardian found a mix of "hip social satire" and sentiment, calling it "perverse, poetic, odd". Ann Bauer was less pleased with its uneven combination of "sappy poetry" and "bold narrative prose". Patrick Sullivan found an "easy authenticity" in the tales.

== Previous publications ==
The stories were previously published separately in the following magazines:

- My Life in Heavy Metal, and How to Love a Republican, were published in Playboy.
- Among the Ik, was published in Zoetrope: All Story.
- Greek Player, Love Slayer, was published in the Missouri Review.
- The Last Single Days of Don Victor Potapenko, was published in Another Chicago Magazine.
- Run Away, My Pale Love, was published in Ploughshares.
- The Law of Sugar, was published in The Denver Quarterly.
- The Pass, was published in the New England Review.
- Moscow, was published in the North American Review.
- Valentino, was published in Other Voices.
- Pornography, was published in Boulevard.
- The Body in Extremis, was published in the Anthology the Ex-Files.
