= Hank Norberg =

American football player (1920–1974)

No. 55, 16
- Position: End

Personal information
- Born: December 22, 1920; Oakland, California, U.S.
- Died: December 4, 1974 (aged 53); Mountain View, California, U.S.
- Listed height: 6 ft 2 in (1.88 m)
- Listed weight: 225 lb (102 kg)

Career information
- High school: Palo Alto (Palo Alto, California)
- College: Stanford (1939–1942)
- NFL draft: 1943: 18th round, 169th overall pick

Career history
- San Francisco 49ers (1946-1947); Chicago Bears (1948)

Career NFL/AAFC statistics
- Receptions: 6
- Receiving yards: 64
- Stats at Pro Football Reference

Henry Francis Norberg Jr. (December 22, 1920 – December 4, 1974) was an American professional football end who played for the San Francisco 49ers of the All-America Football Conference (AAFC) and the Chicago Bears of the National Football League (NFL). He played college football at Stanford University.

== Early life and college ==
Henry Francis Norberg Jr. was born on December 22, 1920, in Oakland, California. He attended Palo Alto High School in Palo Alto, California.

Norberg was a member of the Stanford Cardinal football team from 1939 to 1942 and a three-year letterman from 1940 to 1942. His football career was interrupted by a stint in the United States Army Air Forces during World War II.

== Professional career ==
Norberg was selected by the Chicago Bears of the National Football League (NFL) in the 18th round, with the 169th overall pick, of the 1943 NFL draft. He signed with the San Francisco 49ers of the newly-formed All-America Football Conference (AAFC) on October 16, 1945. He played in all 14 games for the 49ers during the team's inaugural season in 1946, recording three receptions for 29 yards and also one interception. Norberg appeared in 11 games in 1947, catching two passes for 31 yards. He was released by the 49ers in 1948.

On September 16, 1948, Norberg signed with the Chicago Bears, who had drafted him five years earlier. He played in ten games for the Bears during the 1948 NFL season and caught one pass for four yards. He became a free agent after the 1948 season.

== Personal life ==
Norberg died on December 4, 1974, in Mountain View, California.
