= Ellwood P. Cubberley High School =

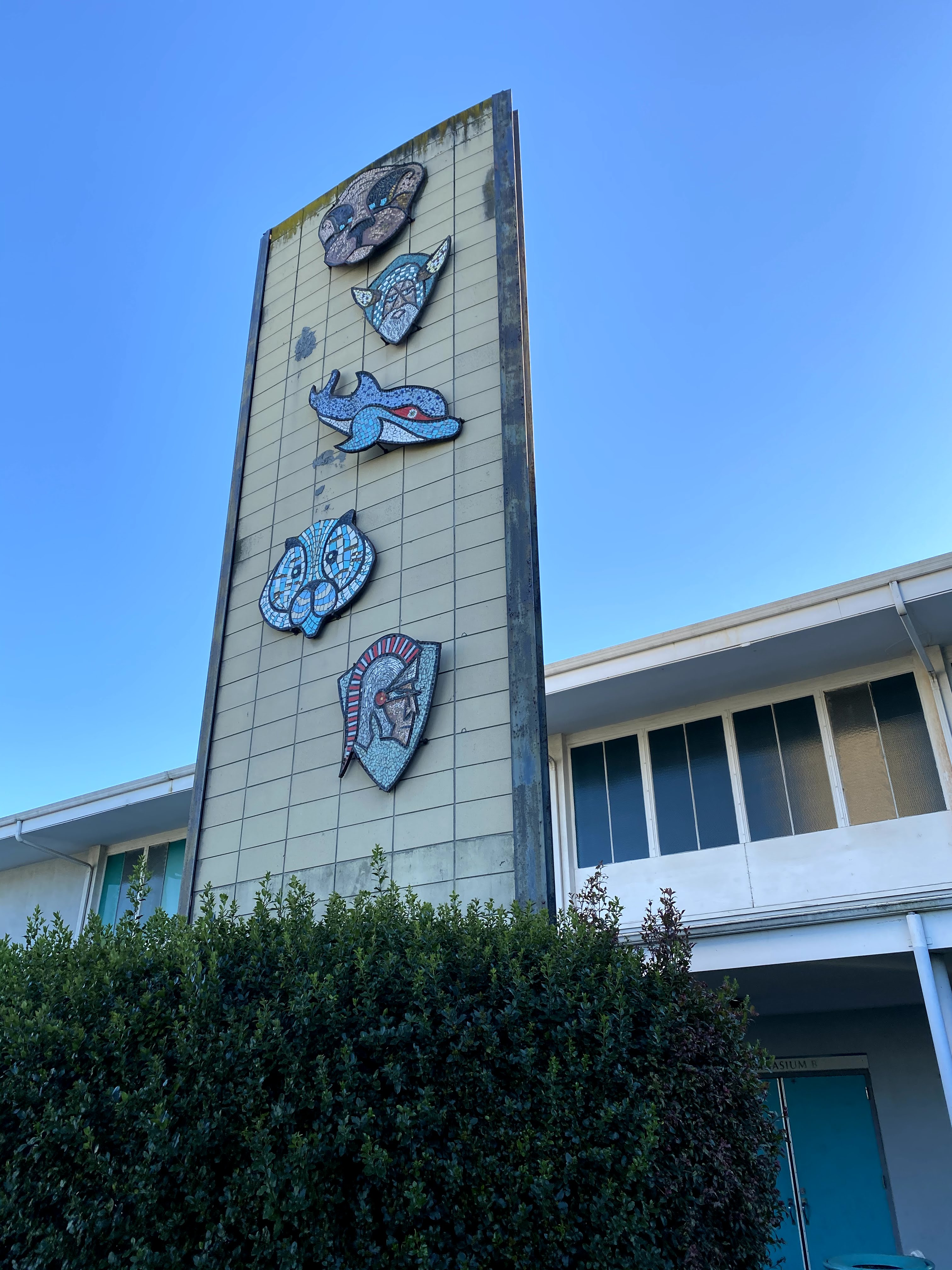

Location
- Palo Alto, California; United States; 37.417874°N 122.107544°W

Information
- Type: Public high school
- Opened: 1956
- Closed: 1979
- School district: Palo Alto Unified School District
- Grades: 9–12 (1975 – 1979); 10 – 12, (1956 – 1975)
- Athletics conference: SPAL; CIF Central Coast Section
- Team name: Cougars
- Newspaper: The Cubberley Catamount
- Communities served: Palo Alto

Ellwood P. Cubberley High School (1956–1979), known locally as "Cubberley", was one of three public high schools in Palo Alto, California. The school closed in 1979. The building is now named the Cubberley Community Center, and it hosts many activities.

== History ==
Opened in 1956, Cubberley High was located at 4000 Middlefield Road. The high school was named after Ellwood Patterson Cubberley, the Dean of the Stanford Graduate School of Education and pioneer of educational administration.

The school was finally closed in 1979 as a reaction to declining enrollment and decreased revenues following Proposition 13. The other local high schools Gunn High School and Palo Alto High School had been created on friendly land transfers from Stanford University and if educational use was to be terminated, the land would revert to the university for the value at the time of transfer. The Palo Alto Unified School District board, requiring an infusion of cash, determined Cubberley could be sold at more contemporary rates. Later it was discovered that it could only be sold to a non-profit organization. That has resulted in part of the campus being converted into the Cubberley Community Center, on an annual lease from the school district to the City of Palo Alto.

The Cubberley Cougars competed in the SPAL of the CIF Central Coast Section. The school won its only CCS Championship in track and field in 1979, just days before it would close forever.

Cubberley was the site of The Third Wave experiment by teacher Ron Jones in 1967, which was an elaborate social experiment to better understand fascism. The experiment was later portrayed in a film and television.

A KQED special program from 1970 features a three-day teaching conference at Cubberley High School that focused on ecology and population issues.

Numerous societal tensions played out at Cubberley from 1967 to 1969 that were the subject of Sylvia Berry Williams' 1970 book Hassling, which gave the school national attention.

For many years the use of the Cubberley location has been subject to local community debate. According to local news in 2011, enrollment projections done by Palo Alto Unified School District suggested Cubberley may need to be reopened as a fourth middle school by 2015 and ultimately be reopened as a third high school by 2021. However these plans were delayed by the city, and the city and the school district have been in discussions.

== Notable alumni ==
This is listed in order by occupation, and listed in alphabetical order by last name.

=== Athletics ===
- Bill Green (class of 1979), Olympic sprinter
- Art Kuehn (class of 1971), NFL football center
- Tom Melvin (class of 1979), NFL coach
- Tom Ritchey (class of c.1974), mountain bike pioneer and founder of Ritchey Design

=== Arts and entertainment ===
- Donny Baldwin (class of 1969), drummer with Elvin Bishop, Jefferson Starship, Cold Blood, Jerry Garcia Band
- Michael Finney (class of c.1973), news presenter and radio consumer reporter
- Željko Ivanek (class of 1975), actor
- Jon Jang (class of 1972), jazz musician
- Gregg Rolie (class of c.1965), musician, founding member of both Santana and Journey
- Dusty Street (class of 1964), radio disc jockey

=== Authors and journalists ===
- James Gurney (class of 1976), illustrator and author
- Neil Howe (class of 1969), author
- Wendy Lesser (class of 1969), critic, novelist, and editor

=== Business ===
- Brendan Eich (class of 1979), creator of JavaScript, co-founder of Mozilla

=== Law ===
- Bruce Fein (class of 1965), constitutional law attorney

=== Religion ===
- Gerrit W. Gong (class of 1971), member of the Quorum of the Twelve Apostles of the Church of Jesus Christ of Latter-day Saints

=== Science ===
- Michio Kaku (class of 1964), theoretical physicist, futurist, science speaker/presenter

== Notable faculty ==
- George Hurley, NFL offensive lineman, Cubberley football coach, taught wood shop, and driving.
- Ron Jones, author and creator of The Third Wave social experiment.

== See also ==
- List of closed secondary schools in California
