= Jan Zobel =

American activist (1947–2018)

- Jan Zobel as a teenager, from a 1963 high school yearbook
- Born: February 8, 1947; San Francisco, California
- Died: September 18, 2018 (aged 71); Oakland, California
- Occupations: Accountant, activist, writer, community organizer

Jan Zobel (February 8, 1947 – September 18, 2018) was an American activist working for LGBTQ rights and community in the San Francisco Bay area. She was also a tax accountant, and published a book on taxes and recordkeeping for women.

== Early life and education ==
Jan Arlene Zobel was born in San Francisco, the daughter of Jerome Fremont Zobel and Louise Purwin Zobel. Her father, a Pearl Harbor survivor, was a physician and professor at Stanford University Hospital, and her mother was a journalist and travel writer. She attended Palo Alto High School and Whittier College, and earned a master's degree in education at the University of Chicago.

== Career ==
Zobel was a teacher by training, and was one of the gay teachers vocal in challenging California's Briggs Initiative. She became an accountant, and had a tax accounting business with offices in San Francisco and Oakland. She gave workshops on the basics of tax preparation. She wrote Minding Her Own Business: The Self-Employed Woman's Guide to Taxes and Recordkeeping, originally published in 1997. She was editor of the San Francisco Bay Area People's Yellow Pages. In 1978, she and Harriet Leve compiled The Women's Connection, a coupon book advertising woman-owned businesses in the Bay Area. She was recognized by the Small Business Administration with their Accountant Advocate of the Year Award.

Zobel was active in gay rights campaigns and in the lesbian communities of the San Francisco Bay area. She joined the board of the San Francisco Women's Centers in 1973. She helped establish the library at the San Francisco Women's Building, taught auto repair classes for women, and assisted other gay and lesbian foster parents in negotiating the social services system. She co-founded Options, a program to educate medical professionals on culturally sensitive care for patients from LGBTQ communities. She organized an annual East Bay Hanukkah party for LGBTQ attendees. She supported and participated in the Bay Times San Francisco Pride Parade. She supported the work of the Astraea Lesbian Foundation for Justice.

In 2002, at age 55, Zobel competed in the Gay Games in Sydney, Australia, in the novice mountain biking event, and won a gold medal for her age group.

== Personal life ==
Zobel died at home in Oakland in 2018, aged 71 years. Her papers are in the collection of the GLBT Historical Society in San Francisco.
