= Steve Almond =

American short-story writer, essayist, and author

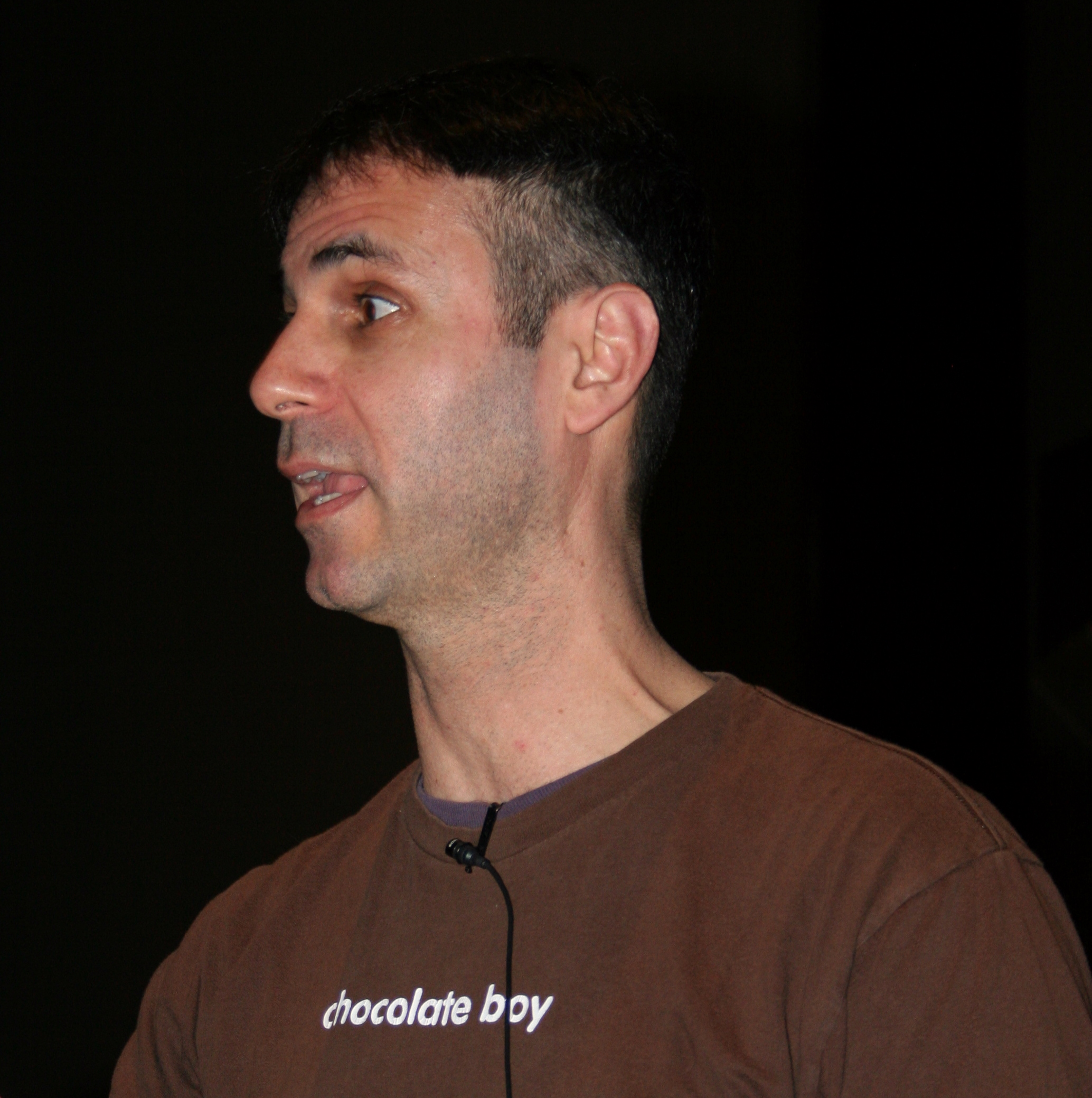
- Steve Almond in 2009
- Born: October 27, 1966 (age 59); California, United States
- Occupations: Writer, teacher, novelist, essayist
- Website: stevealmondjoy.org

Steve Almond (born October 27, 1966) is an American short-story writer, essayist, and author of fifteen books, four of which are self-published.

== Life ==
Steve Almond was born on October 27, 1966, in California. Almond was raised in Palo Alto, California, graduated from Henry M. Gunn High School. He received his undergraduate degree from Wesleyan University. He spent seven years as a newspaper reporter, mostly in El Paso and at the Miami New Times.

Almond lives in Arlington, Massachusetts with his wife and three children.

== Literary work ==
Almond's 2014 book Against Football, which documents his growing disillusionment with American football, derived from two pieces written for The New York Times. Almond's second book, Candyfreak (2005) was a New York Times Best Seller and won the American Library Association Alex Award and was named the Booksense Adult Nonfiction Book of the Year.

Almond's books have been published in half a dozen foreign countries and translated into German, Dutch, Spanish, and Croatian. He has published more than 150 stories in magazines such as Tin House, Playboy, Zoetrope, and Ploughshares. His story "Donkey Greedy, Donkey Gets Punched" was selected for The Best American Short Stories 2010 and has been optioned for film by Spilt Milk Entertainment.

Two of his stories were published in The Pushcart Prize. His essays and journalism have appeared in venues such as The New York Times Magazine, GQ, The Wall Street Journal, Poets & Writers, and Real Simple. His stories and essays have appeared in dozens of anthologies. Almond also reviews books for The New York Times, The Boston Globe, and the Los Angeles Times. He regularly teaches at GrubStreet in Boston, at the Sanibel Writer's Conference, and the Tin House Writer's Conference.

== Teaching ==
Almond teaches non-fiction to fellows in the Nieman Fellowship program, based in Cambridge, Massachusetts.

== Political activities ==
Almond served as adjunct professor in creative writing at Boston College for five years, until publishing an open letter of resignation in The Boston Globe on May 12, 2006, in which he explained that his resignation was intended to protest the selection of Condoleezza Rice as the college's 2006 commencement guest speaker. He later appeared on the Hannity & Colmes show on Fox News to discuss his decision.

Almond is a regular contributor to The New York Times Magazine's Riff section, and to the literary website The Rumpus, where he writes frequently about the intersection of morality and politics titled "The Week in Greed." Almond's January 2023 interview with Laura Ingraham in support of Against Football abruptly ended after he made an unwelcome comparison between the economic pressure on Fox that forced Ingraham to apologize for a tasteless tweet to the economic pressure needed on owners to make professional football safer for players.

== Self-publishing ==
After a decade of working with traditional publishers, Almond has self-published three books in recent years and become an outspoken advocate of self-publishing, which he has written about extensively in the Los Angeles Times, Poets & Writers, and The Rumpus.

Almond was a contributing writer to Alarm Clock Theatre Company's Elliot Norton Award-winning play PS Page Me Later, based on selections from Found Magazine.

== Radio and podcast ==
Almond is a regular correspondent on NPR's Here & Now and on WGBH, both based in Boston. On October 27, 2011, Almond appeared as a guest on the podcast WTF with Marc Maron. Almond also hosted a live interview podcast series with Hallelujah the Hills band leader Ryan Walsh entitled "This Has Been A Disaster – Thanks For Having Us." Almond co-hosted the Dear Sugars podcast for four years with Cheryl Strayed.

== Film adaptions ==
Almond's first novel, "Which Brings Me to You," (co-written with Julianna Baggott) was made into a 2024 romantic comedy starring Lucy Hale and Nat Wolff. His second novel, "All the Secrets of the World," is in development with 20th Century Fox Television.

== Bibliography ==
=== Short stories ===
- My Life in Heavy Metal, Atlantic/Grove; Random House UK; Verlag Kiepenheuer & Witsch Germany, Fokus Komunikacije Croatia, 2002
- The Evil B.B. Chow and Other Stories, Algonquin Books, 2005
- God Bless America: Stories, Lookout Books, 2011
- Writs of Passion, DIY or Die Press, 2013.

=== Nonfiction ===
- Candyfreak: A Journey Through the Chocolate Underbelly of America, Algonquin Books, 2004.
- (Not That You Asked) Rants, Exploits and Obsessions, Random House, September 11, 2007.
- Letters from People Who Hate Me, DIY or Die Press, self-published with Espresso Book Machine, 2010.
- Rock and Roll Will Save Your Life, Random House, 2010.
- This Won't Take But a Minute, Honey, self-published.
- Bad Poetry, DIY or Die Press.
- Against Football: One Fan's Reluctant Manifesto, Melville House Publishing, 2014.
- Bad Stories: What the Hell Just Happened to Our Country, Red Hen Press, 2018.
- William Stoner and the Battle for the Inner Life: Bookmarked, Ig Publishing, 2019.
- Truth Is the Arrow, Mercy Is the Bow: A DIY Manual for the Construction of Stories Zando, 2024

=== Fiction ===
- All the Secrets of the World, (Zando, 2022)

=== Co-author ===
- Which Brings Me to You: A Novel in Confessions (with Julianna Baggott), Algonquin Books, 2006
