= Frank S. Greene =

American scientist and venture capitalist

- Born: Frank S. Greene Jr. October 19, 1938; Washington, D.C.
- Died: December 26, 2009 (aged 71)
- Education: Washington University in St. Louis (Bachelors of Science [BS]); Purdue University (MSc); Santa Clara University (PhD)
- Scientific career
- Workplaces: United States Air Force; Technology Development Corporation; Zero One Systems

Frank S. Greene Jr. (October 19, 1938 – December 26, 2009) was an American scientist and venture capitalist. In 1993 Greene founded New Vista Capital, a venture capital firm that focussed on minority groups. He was awarded outstanding alumni awards from Washington University in St. Louis, Purdue University and Santa Clara University.

== Education ==
Greene was one of the first African-American students to study at Washington University in St. Louis. He graduated with a bachelor's degree in electrical engineering and moved to Purdue University for his graduate studies. In 1962, after earning a master's degree in electrical engineering Greene joined the United States Air Force. He was the first African-American cadet to graduate the Air Force Reserve Officer Training Corps (ROTC) program, eventually rising to the rank of Air Force captain. He worked as an electronics officer, creating high performance computers for the National Security Agency. He was part of the team at Fairchild Semiconductor which achieved the fastest memory chip speeds at the time. After his time in the Air Force Greene returned to higher education, starting a doctoral research program at Santa Clara University. He completed his doctorate in electrical engineering at Santa Clara University in 1970. Greene later became the first African-American trustee at Santa Clara University.

== Career ==
Greene was the founding Chief Executive Officer of the Technology Development Corporation (TDC). TDC was a research and development engineering services organisation that served the federal government of the United States. The projects completed by TDC included the avionics equipment for the General Dynamics F-16 Fighting Falcon, the space shuttle programme and a communication system for scuba divers. When TDC was traded publicly in 1985 it had over 300 employees. In 1985 Greene founded ZeroOne Systems, a supercomputing systems house. By 1987 ZeroOne had reached annual revenues of $15 million.

Greene dedicated his career to improving the representation of African-Americans in technology. He started a scholarship program in honor of his wife, Phyllis Greene, who supported the NAACP throughout her career. The scholarship is for African-American scholars from the San Jose area. In 1993 Greene founded New Vista Capital, a venture capital firm that supports people from marginalised groups. The Frank S. Greene scholars program was established in 2001 to support students in K–12 education in accessing mathematics and science education. The program boasts an impressive success rate; with all of its graduate attending college. The scholars program includes a science fair, monthly classes, an engineering competition, a career day and parent enrichment workshops.

=== Awards and honours ===
His awards and honours include:

- 1991 Washington University in St. Louis Black Alumni Achievement Award
- 1993 Santa Clara University Distinguished Engineering Alumnus
- 1999 Purdue University Outstanding Electrical and Computer Engineer Award
- 2002 Silicon Valley Engineering Hall of Fame
- 2009 Palo Alto City Hall Most Important African-Americans in Technology

In 2018, Jordan Middle School in Palo Alto was renamed after Greene.

== Personal life ==
Greene was born in Washington, D.C. His parents were Frank S. Greene Senior and Irma Olivia Swygert. Greene was raised in St. Louis, Missouri. He was raised in a segregated society and was part of the civil rights movement. Greene died on December 26, 2009.
