= James Josh Snodgrass =

American biological anthropologist

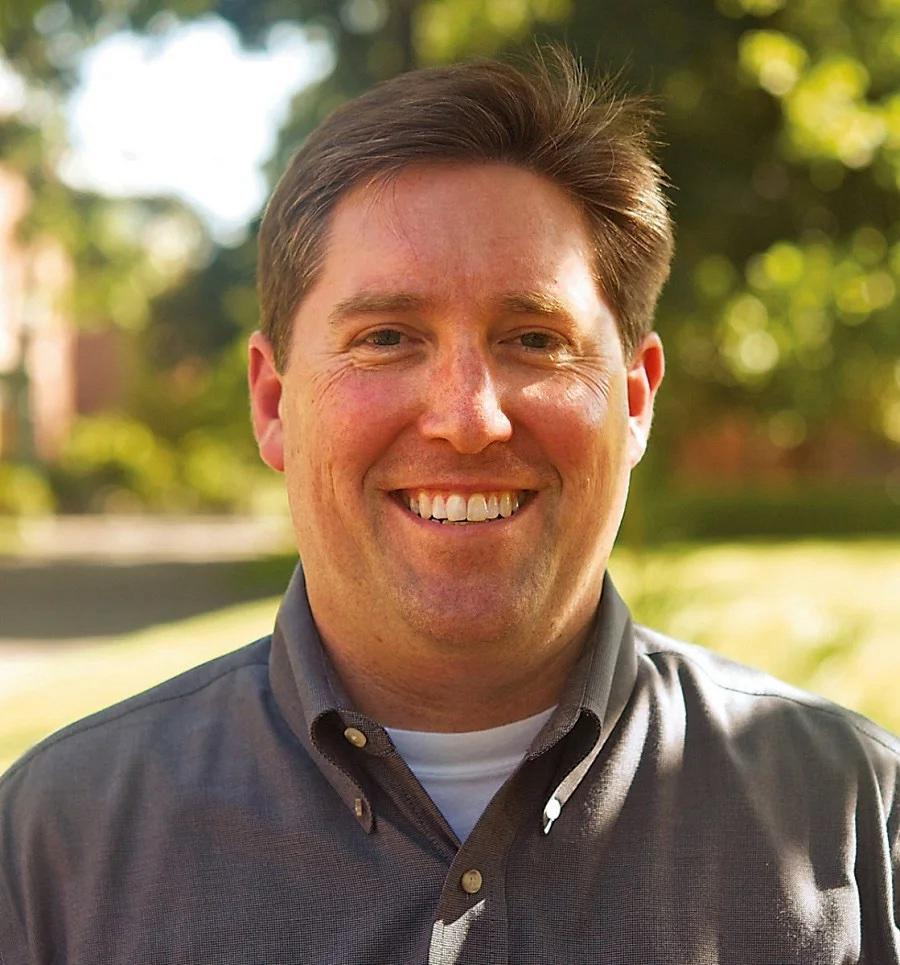
- Education: University of California, Santa Cruz; University of Florida; University of Chicago; Northwestern University
- Scientific career
- Fields: Biological Anthropology
- Workplaces: University of Oregon; University of California, Santa Cruz

James Josh Snodgrass is an American biological anthropologist and professor at the University of Oregon. He is Co-Director of the university's Global Health Program, Director of the Global Health Biomarker Laboratory and Department Head of Anthropology. His work focuses on human biology, global health, and the biological impacts of social and environmental stressors. He has been an elected Fellow of the American Association for the Advancement of Science(AAAS) since 2013. His work has been published in journals including American Journal of Human Biology, The Lancet, Psychoneuroendocrinology, and Proceedings of the National Academy of Sciences.

== Education ==
He completed his highschool from Palo Alto High School in 1990.

Snodgrass received his B.A. in Anthropology from the University of California, Santa Cruz in 1995. He earned an M.A. in Anthropology and Zoology from the University of Florida in 1998, and a Ph.D. in Anthropology from Northwestern University in 2004. He completed a postdoctoral fellowship in Cognitive and Social Neuroscience at the University of Chicago from 2004 to 2005.

== Career ==
Snodgrass began his academic career in anthropology at the University of California, Santa Cruz, where he also worked as manager of the anthropology laboratories. In 1996, he took part in a United Nations-sponsored human-rights mission in Croatia through Physicians for Human Rights. As part of a forensic team, he helped analyze remains from a mass grave near Vukovar, contributing to war crimes investigations related to the Yugoslav Wars.

Snodgrass joined the University of Oregon faculty in 2005. He holds appointments in the Department of Anthropology and the Food Studies and Global Health programs. He co-directs the Global Health minor program and the university’s Center for Global Health. Current he is also serving as Department Head of Anthropology.

He is co-director of the Shuar Health and Life History Project in the Amazon region of Ecuador, which began in 2007. In 2024, he became co-director of the Homelessness, Policy, and Health project based in Eugene, Oregon. He has collaborated for nearly two decades with the World Health Organization on projects including the Study on global Ageing and adult health (SAGE), the Tunisian Health Examination Survey, and the World Health Survey Plus.

In 2013, he received the Michael A. Little Early Career Award from the Human Biology Association.

Snodgrass was elected a Fellow of the American Association for the Advancement of Science (AAAS) for his work in human biology, particularly in areas related to global health, nutrition, energetics, aging, and evolutionary medicine.

In 2014, he was recognized in the Profiles in Excellence series at the University of Oregon for his advising and mentorship. He was also named a “Scientist to Watch” by The Scientist magazine.

== Research ==
Snodgrass’s research focuses on human biological adaptation, the health effects of social and environmental change, and the use of minimally invasive biomarkers in population health studies.

From 2001 to 2015, he co-directed the Indigenous Siberian Health and Adaptation Project, which examined metabolic adaptation to cold stress and health transitions among Indigenous populations in post-Soviet Russia. The project found elevated resting metabolic rates in response to cold exposure, a decline in adaptation over time, and links between subsistence practices, thyroid function, and seasonal variation.

Since 2005, Snodgrass has co-led the Shuar Health and Life History Project in Ecuador. This work investigates how economic development affects health among the Shuar, contributing findings on inflammation, bone density, immune development, and growth patterns. At the University of Oregon, Snodgrass directs the Global Health Biomarker Laboratory, which develops and applies techniques such as dried blood spot, saliva, hair, and urine analysis. His 2007 co-authored paper “What a drop can do” promoted wider adoption of these methods.

== Selected publications ==
- Snodgrass, J. Josh (2022). "Minimally invasive biomarkers in human population biology research, part 2: An introduction to the special issue". American Journal of Human Biology. 34 (11) e23822. doi:10.1002/ajhb.23822. ISSN 1042-0533. PMID 36256677.
- DeLouize, Alicia M.; Eick, Geeta; Karam, Sana D.; Snodgrass, J. Josh (2022). "Current and future applications of biomarkers in samples collected through minimally invasive methods for cancer medicine and population-based research". American Journal of Human Biology. 34 (11) e23665. doi:10.1002/ajhb.23665. ISSN 1042-0533. PMC 9894104. PMID 34374148.
- Snodgrass, J Josh; Leonard, William R; Tarskaia, Larissa A; Schoeller, Dale A (2006). "Total energy expenditure in the Yakut (Sakha) of Siberia as measured by the doubly labeled water method". The American Journal of Clinical Nutrition. 84 (4): 798–806. doi:10.1093/ajcn/84.4.798. PMID 17023706.
- Snodgrass, J. Josh; Leonard, William R.; Tarskaia, Larissa A.; Alekseev, Vasili P.; Krivoshapkin, Vadim G. (2005). "Basal metabolic rate in the Yakut (Sakha) of Siberia". American Journal of Human Biology. 17 (2): 155–172. doi:10.1002/ajhb.20106. ISSN 1042-0533. PMID 15736182.
- Snodgrass, JJ (2004-05-01). "Sex Differences and Aging of the Vertebral Column". Journal of Forensic Sciences. 49 (3): JFS2003198–6. doi:10.1520/jfs2003198. ISSN 0022-1198. PMID 15171159.
- Snodgrass, JJ; Galloway, A (2003-11-01). "Utility of Dorsal Pits and Pubic Tubercle Height in Parity Assessment". Journal of Forensic Sciences. 48 (6): 1–5. doi:10.1520/jfs2003027. ISSN 0022-1198.
- Leonard, William R; Robertson, Marcia L; Snodgrass, J.Josh; Kuzawa, Christopher W (2003). "Metabolic correlates of hominid brain evolution". Comparative Biochemistry and Physiology Part A: Molecular & Integrative Physiology. 136 (1): 5–15. doi:10.1016/S1095-6433(03)00132-6. PMID 14527625.
- Galloway, A; Snodgrass, JJ (1998-09-01). "Biological and Chemical Hazards of Forensic Skeletal Analysis". Journal of Forensic Sciences. 43 (5): 940–948. doi:10.1520/jfs14338j. ISSN 0022-1198.
- Snodgrass, J. Josh; Leonard, William R.; Sorensen, Mark V.; Tarskaia, Larissa A.; Alekseev, Vasili P.; Krivoshapkin, Vadim (2006). "The Emergence of Obesity among Indigenous Siberians". Journal of Physiological Anthropology. 25 (1): 75–84. doi:10.2114/jpa2.25.75. ISSN 1880-6791. PMID 16617212.
- Sorensen, M.V.; Leonard, W.R.; Tarskaya, L.A.; Ivanov, K.I.; Snodgrass, J.J.; Alekseev, V.P.; Krivoshapkin, V.G.; Rifai, N. (2006). "High-sensitivity C-reactive protein, adiposity, and blood pressure in the Yakut of Siberia". American Journal of Human Biology. 18 (6): 766–775. doi:10.1002/ajhb.20547. ISSN 1042-0533. PMID 17039474.
