= Kate Snodgrass =

American theater director and playwright

- Education: University of Kansas (BA); Wichita State University (BA); Boston University (MFA)
- Occupations: Theater director, playwright
- Employer: Boston University
- Awards: Elliot Norton Award for Excellence; 2012

Kate Snodgrass is an American theater director and playwright. She was the artistic director of Boston Playwrights' Theatre until 2022. She is a professor of the practice of playwriting in the English Department of Boston University. Snodgrass won the 2012 Boston Theatre Critics Association's Elliot Norton Award for Sustained Excellence.

Along with playwright Bill Lattanzi, she co-founded the Boston Theater Marathon which also has won the Elliot Norton Award. Snodgrass is a former Kennedy Center American College Theater Festival National Chair of the Playwriting Program, a former vice president of StageSource, Inc., and a member of Actors' Equity Association, American Federation of Television and Radio Artists, and Dramatists Guild of America.

Snodgrass is a playwriting Fellow at the Huntington Theatre Company. She is the author of the 1988 play Haiku (Heidemann Award, anthologized and translated into German, Gaelic, Portuguese), Observatory Conditions (Independent Reviewers of New England Award), and The Glider (2004) (Independent Reviewers of New England Award, American Association of Community Theatre's Steinberg Award Nomination), among others. Her full-length play 'The Art of Burning' was produced in 2023 by the Huntington Theatre Company and Hartford Stage Company, directed by Melia Bensussen.

Among other initiatives, Snodgrass coordinated the Second Sunday Reading Series at Boston Playwrights' Theatre, which featured a play in development, voiced by a full cast of characters, held the second Sunday of each month (October through April) at Erbaluce in Boston.

As a teacher and educator, Snodgrass has received StageSource's Theatre Hero Award, the Leonides A. Nickole Theatre Educator of the Year Award for Excellence, and the Milan Stitt Award for Outstanding Teacher of Playwriting from the Kennedy Center American College Theater Festival. Her short plays L'Air Des Alpes, Que Sera, Sera, Critics' Circle and Wasteland have been published/anthologized by Cedar Press, Dramatic Publishing Company, Bakers Plays, and Smith & Kraus Publishers, respectively.

Snodgrass holds B.A. degrees from the University of Kansas and Wichita State University, and a master's degree in creative writing from Boston University.

== Plays ==
- The Art of Burning
- The Last Bark
- The Tempest (A Storm in One Act)
- Haiku
- The Glider
- Brickwork
- The Seduction
- Parallelogram
- Rubik's Goldberg Variation
- New Hampshire
- OZ
- Critics' Circle
- Observatory Conditions
- L'Air Des Alpes
- Que Sera, Sera
- Spaghetti Al Dente
- Prairie Echoes
- Asylum
- How I Saw the Light
- Circus
