= George Hurley (American football) =

American football player (1909–1995)

No. 28
- Position: Guard

Personal information
- Born: January 5, 1909; San Francisco, California, U.S.
- Died: April 9, 1995 (aged 86); Palo Alto, California, U.S.
- Listed height: 6 ft 0 in (1.83 m)
- Listed weight: 200 lb (91 kg)

Career information
- High school: Lick-Wilmerding (San Francisco, California)
- College: Washington State

Career history
- Boston Braves/Redskins (1932–1933)

George Frank Hurley (January 5, 1909 – April 9, 1995) was an American football player and coach. He played professionally as a guard in the National Football League (NFL) for the Boston Braves/Redskins from 1932 to 1933. Hurley played college football at Washington State University. He coached high school football at Cubberley High School in Palo Alto, California.

Hurley was the head coach of the 1945 Camp Beale Bears football team.

== Head coaching record ==
Year	Team	Overall	Conference	Standing	Bowl/playoffs
Camp Beale Bears (Independent) (1945)
1945	Camp Beale	6–1–2			
Camp Beale:		6–1–2			
Total:		6–1–2			
