= Tom Melvin =

American football coach (born 1961)

Kansas City Chiefs
- Title: Tight ends coach

Personal information
- Born: October 1, 1961 (age 65); Redwood City, California, U.S.

Career information
- Position: Offensive lineman
- High school: Ellwood P. Cubberley (Palo Alto, California)
- College: San Francisco State, Northern Arizona

Career history
- San Francisco State (1984–1985) Graduate assistant; Northern Arizona (1986–1987) Running backs, offensive line & tight ends coach; UC–Santa Barbara (1988–1990) Offensive coordinator & offensive line coach; Occidental (1991–1998) Offensive coordinator & offensive line coach; Philadelphia Eagles (1999–2001) Offensive assistant & quality control coach; Philadelphia Eagles (2002–2012) Tight ends coach; Kansas City Chiefs (2013–present) Tight ends coach

Awards and highlights
- 3× Super Bowl champion (LIV, LVII, LVIII)

Tom Melvin (born October 1, 1961) is an American football coach who is currently the tight ends coach for the Kansas City Chiefs of the National Football League (NFL). His cousin, Bob Melvin, is manager of the San Francisco Giants.

== Playing career ==
=== Early life ===
Melvin attended Ellwood P. Cubberley High School in Palo Alto, California and lettered in football and soccer. He graduated from Cubberley High School in 1979.

=== College ===
Melvin attended San Francisco State University, where he played football as an offensive lineman. He graduated with a bachelor's degree in physical education. He earned a master's degree in educational administration while he coached at Northern Arizona University.

== Coaching career ==
=== College ===
Melvin's first coaching job was as a graduate assistant at San Francisco State University. He then coached at Northern Arizona University, where he tutored tight end Shawn Collins.

After this, he coached at University of California, Santa Barbara. UCSB's offense was ranked fifth during Melvin's tenure in 1989, and Melvin coached five All-America selections.

Following UCSB, Melvin coached at Occidental College for eight years, as offensive coordinator and offensive line coach.

=== Professional ===
In 1999, Melvin joined the Philadelphia Eagles coaching staff, serving for three seasons as the offensive assistant/quality control coach before moving to his current position as tight ends coach. In 2019, Melvin won his first Super Bowl when the Kansas City Chiefs defeated the San Francisco 49ers 31–20 in Super Bowl LIV. In 2022, Melvin won his second Super Bowl when the Chiefs defeated the Philadelphia Eagles 38–35 in Super Bowl LVII. In 2023, Melvin won his third Super Bowl when the Chiefs defeated the 49ers 25–22 in Super Bowl LVIII.
