= Keith Raffel =

American technology entrepreneur and writer

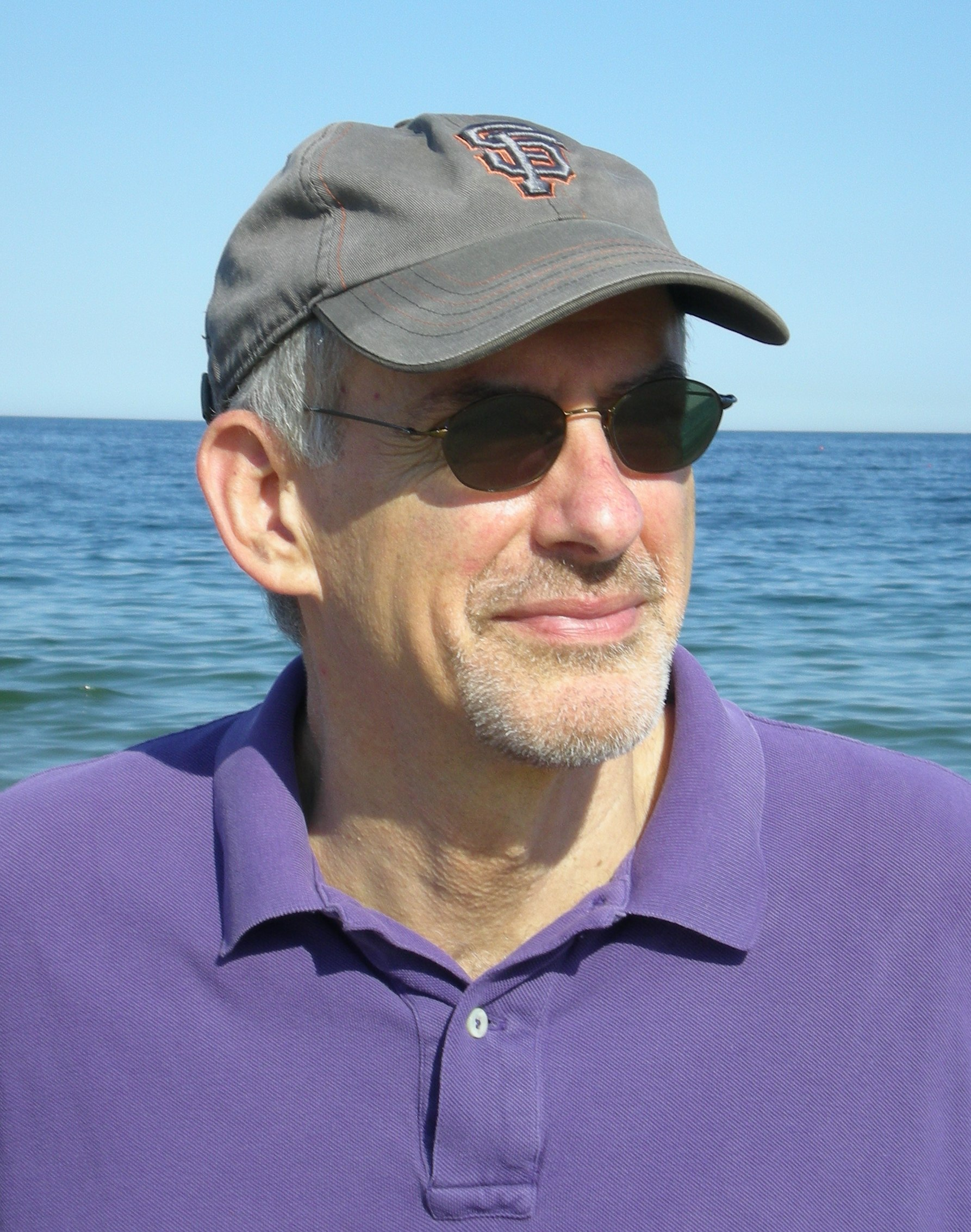
- Born: Chicago, Illinois
- Education: Harvard University (AB); Harvard Law School (JD)
- Occupations: Technology executive; Novelist; Syndicated columnist; University lecturer; United States Senate aide
- Website: keithraffel.com

Keith Raffel is an American novelist, syndicated columnist, technology executive, university lecturer, and former United States Senate aide and political candidate. He is the author of five novels and a collection of essays. After graduating from Harvard Law School, Raffel served as counsel to the United States Senate Select Committee on Intelligence during the late 1970s and early 1980s. He returned to his home state of California in 1982, where he unsuccessfully ran for United States Congress. Raffel then embarked on business career in the technology sector. In 1996, he founded UpShot Corporation, a customer relationship management (CRM) software company that was a pioneer in cloud computing and was later acquired by Siebel Systems. From 2011 to 2013 Raffel served as senior vice president and chief commercial officer at Complete Genomics, a life sciences company that specializes in human genome sequencing and analysis. He is currently a resident scholar at Harvard University and a nationally syndicated columnist.

== Early life and education ==
Raffel grew up in Palo Alto, California, and attended Palo Alto High School. He graduated from Harvard College with a Bachelor of Arts and from Harvard Law School with a Juris Doctor. He also earned a Master of Letters in modern history from the University of Oxford.

== Political career ==
Raffel served as counsel to the United States Senate Select Committee on Intelligence from 1977 to 1981. During this time Congress passed the Foreign Intelligence Surveillance Act (1978), the Classified Information Procedures Act (1980), and the Intelligence Oversight Act (1980). In 1982, Raffel ran for the Democratic Party nomination for the United States House of Representatives seat from California's 12th congressional district, which was vacated by incumbent Republican Pete McCloskey. Raffel was defeated in the primary election. The seat was won by Republican Ed Zschau.

== Business/academic career ==
Raffel served in a number of executive roles with ROLM from 1982 to 1989 and with Echelon Corporation from 1989 to 1996. In 1996, he founded UpShot Corporation, a software company that delivered Internet-based customer relationship management and sales automation tools for businesses. UpShot was the first company in Silicon Valley to provide cloud computing solutions. Within two years, UpShot released its first product, and by 2003 the company provided services for small, midsize, and large organizations. UpShot competed with Salesforce.com for market share among large, Fortune 1000 companies. In July 2003, Salesforce.com filed a complaint against UpShot in the United States District Court for the Northern District of California, claiming that advertising put out by Raffel's firm had violated state and federal laws pertaining to fair business competition. Raffel argued that his firm's ads were truthful, and noted that Salesforce.com had been aggressive in its advertising, particularly in targeting Siebel Systems. He was quoted as saying, “Salesforce suing over an ad is like the person who kills both his parents and then asks for mercy because he's an orphan.”

In November 2003, Siebel Systems purchased UpShot for $70 million. Raffel then worked for Siebel until 2006, when it was purchased by Oracle Corporation. He remained with Oracle until 2008. At Siebel, Raffel served as group vice president of the company's OnDemand operation, where he oversaw a series of software upgrades and added features to provide social networking and market segmentation tools to his firm's customers. In June 2011 Raffel joined Complete Genomics as Senior Vice President and Chief Commercial Officer. The life sciences company, based in the Mountain View, California, provided sequencing and analysis of human genomes. He left the company in June 2013 three months after it was purchased by the Chinese company, BGI-Shenzhen. Since 2017, he has been at Harvard University as a resident scholar in Mather House, an adviser to undergraduates, and a fellow in the Office of Career Services. He also served as a lecturer at the Paulson School of Engineering and Applied Sciences, where he developed and co-taught a course on technology policy and ethics.

== Writing career ==
=== Thrillers ===
Raffel's first novel, Dot Dead, was published in 2006 by Midnight Ink, an imprint of Llewellyn Worldwide. The murder mystery is set in Silicon Valley, and centers on Ian Michaels, a young technology executive. Michaels discovers his housekeeper, Gwendolyn Goldberg, dead on his bed when he returns home one day, and is suspected of her murder. The New York Times called Dot Dead “a murder mystery worthy of a Steve Jobs keynote presentation.” Smasher, Raffel's next book, continues the story of Ian Michaels as he defends his company from a potential takeover, investigates the work of his aunt at Stanford University's physics department, and protects his wife—a deputy district attorney—from a mysterious threat.

Raffel's third novel, Drop By Drop: A Thriller, was published in 2011. The story's main character is Sam Rockman, a history professor at Stanford, who loses his wife in a bombing at San Francisco International Airport. Rockman is appointed to the Senate Intelligence Committee to investigate the terrorist attack.

Raffel's fourth novel, A Fine and Dangerous Season, was published by Thomas & Mercer, an imprint of Amazon Publishing, in November 2013. The work of historical fiction is set during the Cuban Missile Crisis and is centered upon Nathan Michaels, a salesman for Hewlett-Packard who knew President Kennedy two decades earlier during their time at Stanford. Kennedy enlists Michaels to use his connections to a KGB agent to communicate with Soviet premier Nikita Khrushchev and resolve the international crisis. Reviews of Drop By Drop and A Fine and Dangerous Season have noted Raffel's professional experience in Washington, D.C. and the verisimilitude with which he portrayed the workings of the government in his novels.

Raffel raised the funds to publish and publicize his fifth novel via a Kickstarter campaign where he crowd-sourced comments, edits, and suggestions. Maris Kreizman of Kickstarter commented, “It was the first time I'd come across a project in which an author specifically solicited editorial feedback from backers…. This was a creative way to invite his audience in closer.” In November 2014, Raffel’s novel Temple Mount was published. In it, high tech entrepreneur Alex Kalman rushes to his dying grandfather’s bedside and finds himself promising to find the Ark of the Covenant, missing for over 2,500 years. In Israel, Kalman picks up a partner in his quest—archeologist Rivka Golan. Within days they are targeted by a sniper, chased through the streets of Jerusalem by a bulldozer, interrogated by Israeli intelligence, and trapped in a tunnel under Jerusalem’s Temple Mount.

Raffel's next novel, The Duplicate, is scheduled for publication in March 2027. On the book's first page, Joe Redmond awakens to find a dead man in his Silicon Valley home, but the corpse is no stranger. The body stiffening on the bed is... himself?

=== Nonfiction ===
Since 2023, Raffel has written a nationally-syndicated weekly column distributed by Creators. A collection of the columns was published in his first book of nonfiction titled, The Raffel Ticket: Betting on America, which draws heavily on his experiences working on Capitol Hill, Silicon Valley, and Harvard University. The topics include politics, technology, history, education, and the fragile state of American democracy. Lee Child, creator of the Jack Reacher thrillers, greeted the book’s publication this way: “Keith Raffel is someone I really pay attention to — he doesn’t always change my mind, but he always makes me think.” Congressman Jamie Raskin wrote, “Keith Raffel’s experience writing thrillers has prepared him to excel as a columnist lighting up the sky with intellectual fireworks on our stranger-than-fiction politics.”

=== List of Works ===
- Dot Dead (2006), ISBN 073870833X
- Smasher (2009), ISBN 0738718742
- Drop By Drop: A Thriller (2011)
- A Fine and Dangerous Season (2012), ISBN 9780988509801
- Temple Mount (2014), ISBN 9780988509887
- The Raffel Ticket (2025), ISBN 9781962693240
- The Duplicate (2027), ISBN 9798895152720
