= Palo Alto Unified School District =

Public school district in Palo Alto, California

Address
- 25 Churchill Avenue Palo Alto, California, 94306; United States
- Coordinates: 37.438350°N 122.148860°W

District information
- Type: Public
- Grades: K–12
- Established: March 20, 1893; 133 years ago
- Superintendent: Trent Bahadursingh (Interim)
- NCES District ID: 0629610

Students and staff
- Students: 10,754 (2020–2021)
- Teachers: 641.19 (FTE)
- Staff: 756.07 (FTE)
- Student–teacher ratio: 16.77:1

Other information
- Website: www.pausd.org

The Palo Alto Unified School District is a public school district located near Stanford University in Palo Alto, California. It consists of twelve primary schools, three middle schools, two comprehensive high schools, an alternative high school, and an adult school.

== History ==
The district itself was founded on March 20, 1893, with the first school opening in September of that year. Enrollment grew until it reached a peak of 15,576 students in 1967. Afterwards, enrollment declined sharply, forcing the district to close many schools. Enrollment was at its lowest in 1989 with only 7,452 students. Jordan Middle School was reopened when enrollment increased again. Barron Park Elementary School was added in 1998, and Terman Middle School was reopened in 2001. In 2013 the district had 12,268 students.

All district schools were closed on March 16, 2020 due to the COVID-19 pandemic. A plan passed on September 29, 2020 to reopen elementary schools on October 12, and high schools on January 7, 2021, caused widespread debate, including criticism from teachers and staff citing safety concerns.

=== Cluster suicide ===
Palo Alto high schools received national attention in 2009 after five of its students committed suicide over a span of nine months, mainly by walking in front of trains at a local crossing. As a result, steps have been taken to limit access to the tracks. Attempts have since been made to try to improve the emotional health of students attending the schools. As of 2015, cluster suicide has remained a problem in the district's high schools.

In February 2016, a team of suicide prevention specialists from Epidemiologic Assistance (Epi-Aids) of the Centers for Disease Control and Prevention (CDC) paid a two-week visit to the area to determine risk factors. In July 2016, the Epi-Aids team released preliminary findings.

== High schools ==
=== Gunn High School ===
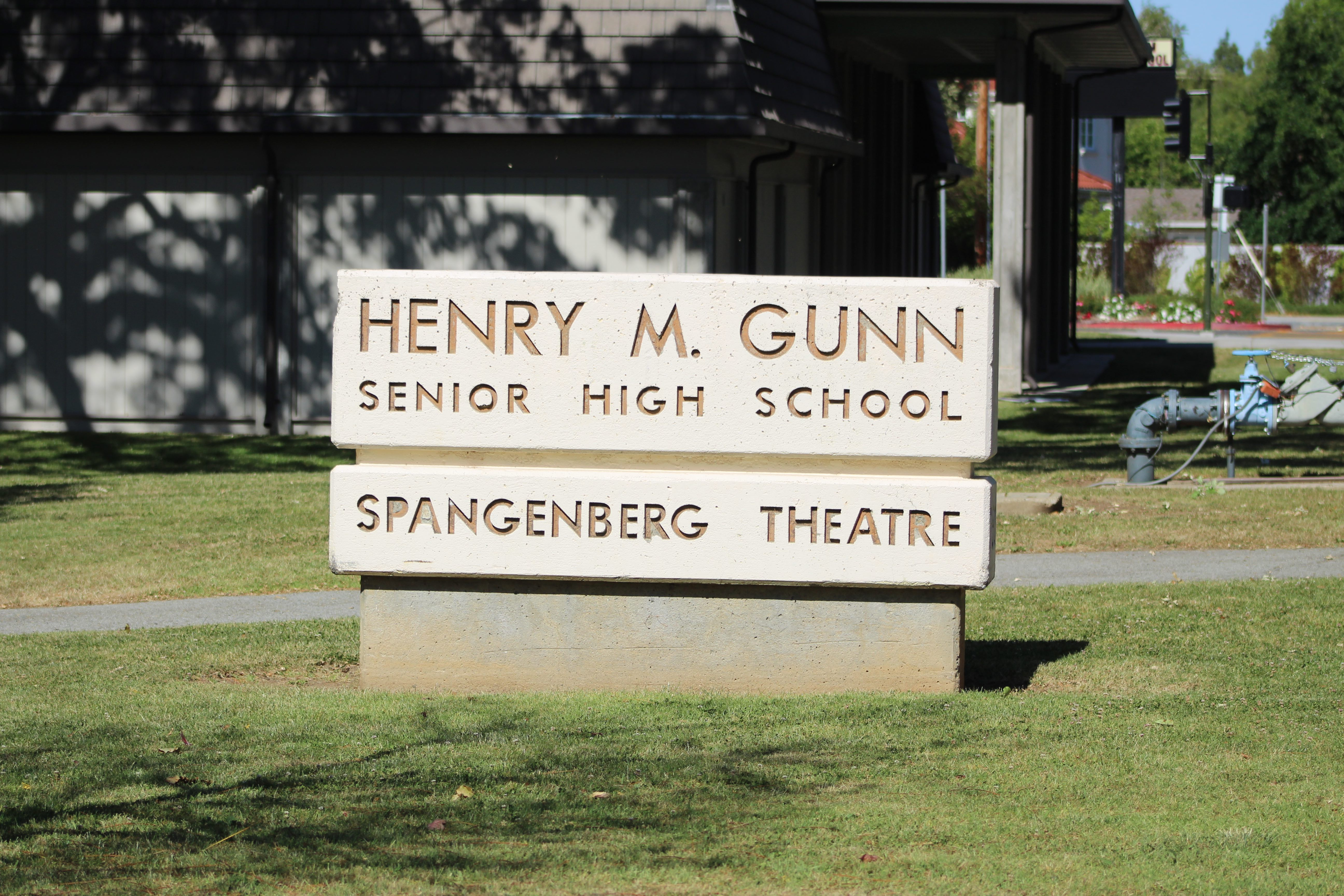
Gunn High School

Henry M. Gunn High School is one of two public high schools in Palo Alto. Gunn is a very academically focused school, ranking as #180 in US News' 2023-24 national high school ranking and #3 in Niche's ranking of California public schools. The school is named after Henry Martin Gunn (1898–1988), Palo Alto's superintendent from 1950–1961, who saw the district expand from 5,500 students to 14,000, adding 17 new schools and is credited with the establishment of community colleges De Anza College and Foothill College. In 1964, the Palo Alto Unified School District announced it would name its third high school after him (the second, Cubberley High School, closed in 1979), with its first class graduating in 1966. The school's mascot is Timmy the Titan. The student newspaper is The Oracle, part of the High School National Ad Network.

=== Palo Alto High School ===
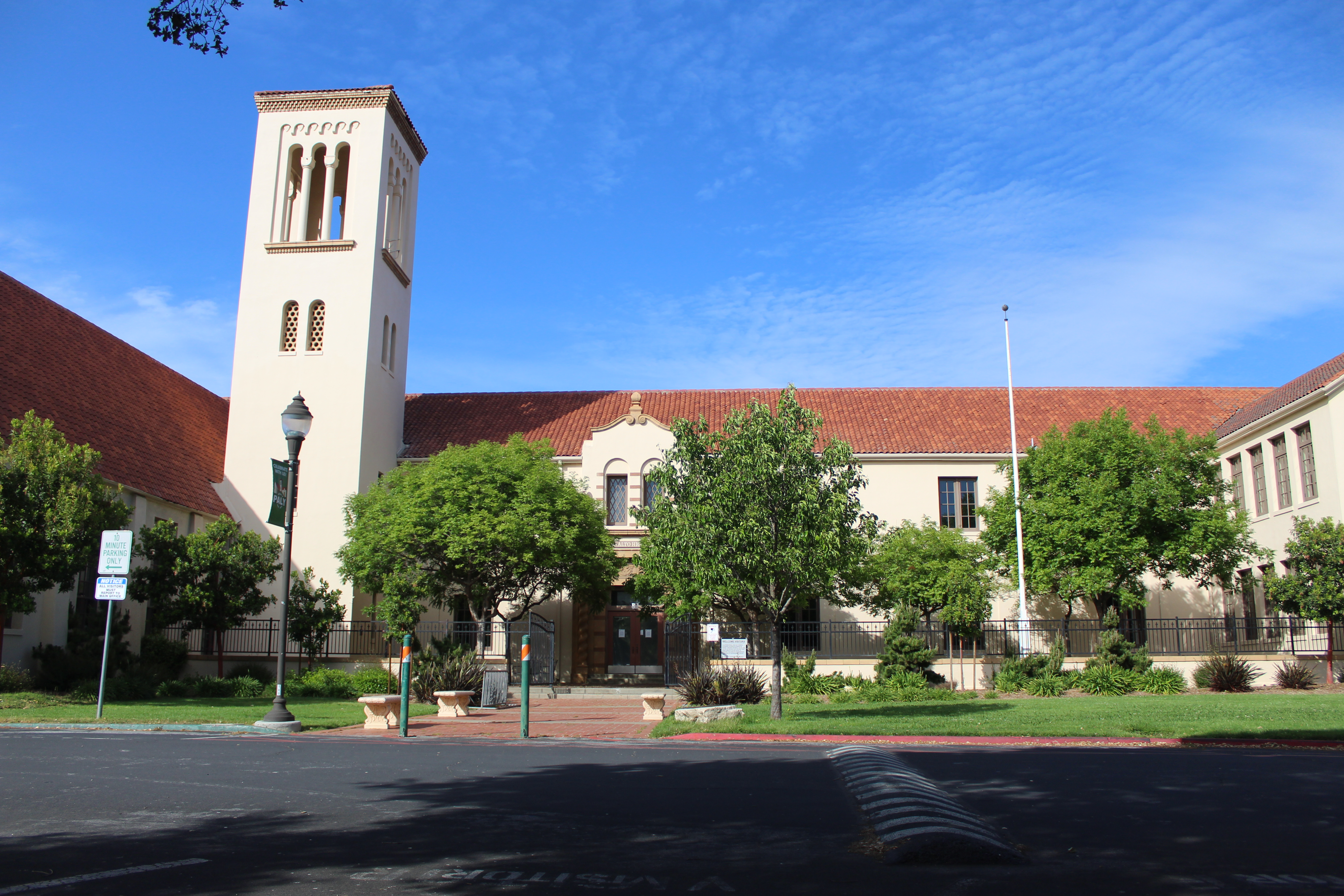
Palo Alto High School

Palo Alto Senior High School, known locally as Paly, is among the oldest high schools in the region. Founded in 1898, its enrollment today is over 1700 students. It is also academically competitive, though is generally regarded as less so than Gunn. Paly ranked #239 in the 2023-24 US News national high school ranking and #7 in Niche's ranking of California Public schools. Palo Alto High also carries on a distinguished athletic tradition, marked in recent years by a rivalry with crosstown foe Gunn, a somewhat less athletically-minded school. Titles won by teams from Paly include California State Championships in Boys Varsity Basketball in 1993 (during which the team went undefeated) and 2006, and a California State Championship in Football in 2010 (as well as CCS Championships in 2006 and 2007). The Paly Girls Varsity Volleyball team won back-to-back state championships in 2010 and 2011. Palo Alto High School also received a multimillion-dollar performing arts center, officially opening on October 1, 2016.

=== Palo Alto Middle College High School ===
Palo Alto Middle College High School, often branded PAMC, is an alternative high school located at the site of Foothill College. First opening its doors during the 2024-25 school year, PAMC is the newest addition to the list of public schools governed by PAUSD. The school features 4 teachers and 5 faculty members supporting and guiding ~50 students across 10th and 11th grade from both Gunn and Palo Alto High School. PAMC is expanding to accommodate students from all high school grade levels starting in the 2025-2026 school year. Students are in a high school setting for 3 hours a day, abiding by California state standard for public high schools. Apart from high school, students take different college classes in replacement for typical high school electives, earning credit for both high school and Foothill College. Palo Alto Middle College was created in order for students to get away from the often-toxic environment created by typical Silicon Valley high schools and aims to do this by providing students with an alternative academic setting.

== Middle schools ==
=== Greene Middle School ===
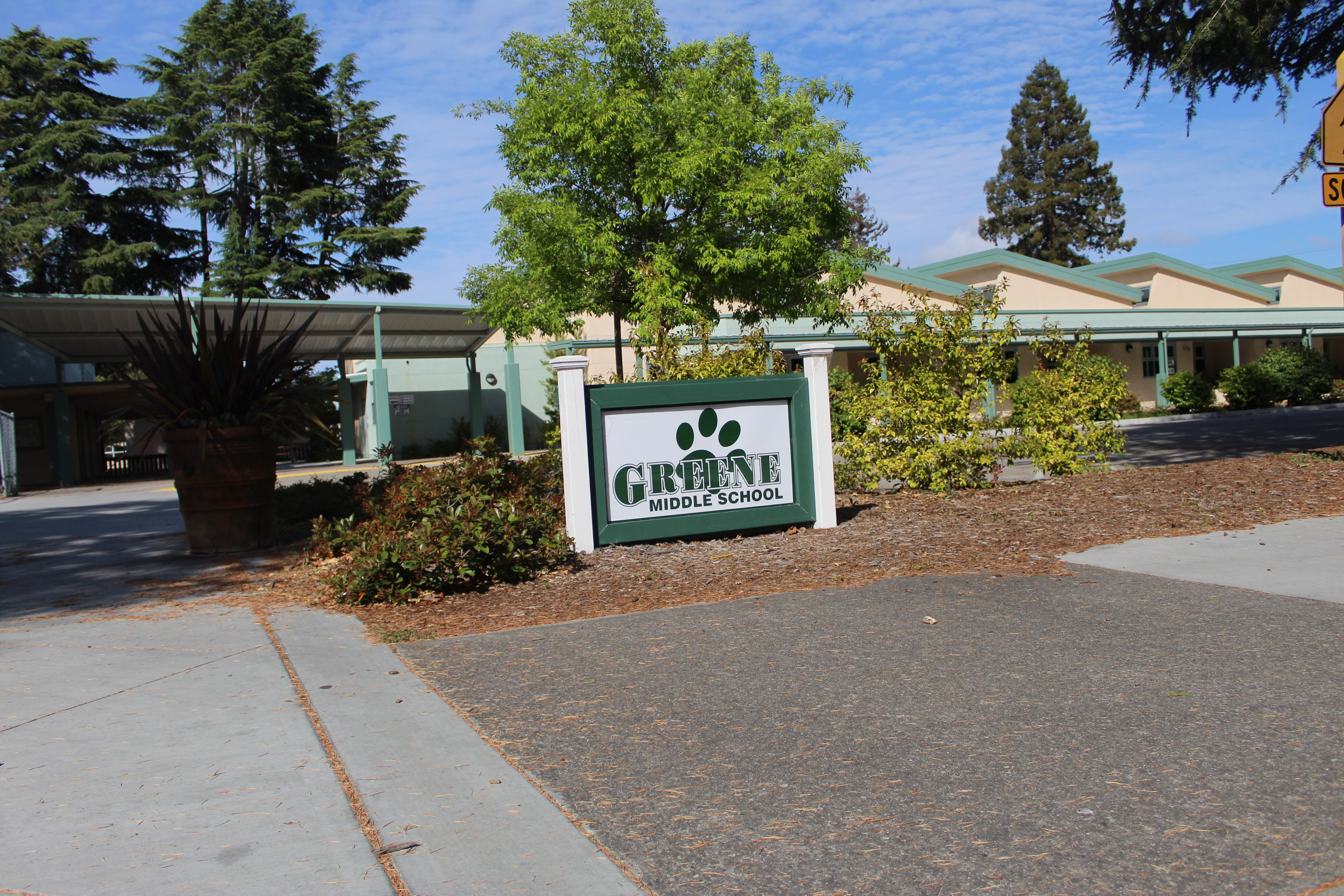
Greene Middle School

Frank S. Greene Jr. Middle School, formerly David S. Jordan Middle School, is located at 750 N. California Ave, Palo Alto, CA 94303. The school mascot is the jaguar and dolphin.

The 2018–19 school year had 1,050 students in attendance. The student population was 54% male and 46% female. Its racial makeup was 40% Caucasian, 30% Asian, 14% Hispanic, 2% African American, and 13% Other (including multiple races).

Named after Stanford University president David Starr Jordan, Jordan Middle School was founded in 1937. It was closed in 1985 due to lack of enrollment in the district, then reopened in 1991 after remodeling. A bond was approved by the city of Palo Alto in 1995 to allow for further technological upgrades to the school.

The school mascot from 1937–1985 was a dolphin. When Jordan reopened in 1991, the students voted to have the jaguar become the mascot. In 1999, the students voted to have the dolphin returned to its status as co-mascot with the jaguar.

Due to Jordan's involvement in eugenics, the school was renamed beginning in the 2018–2019 school year after venture capitalist Frank S. Greene Jr.

=== Jane Lathrop Stanford Middle School ===
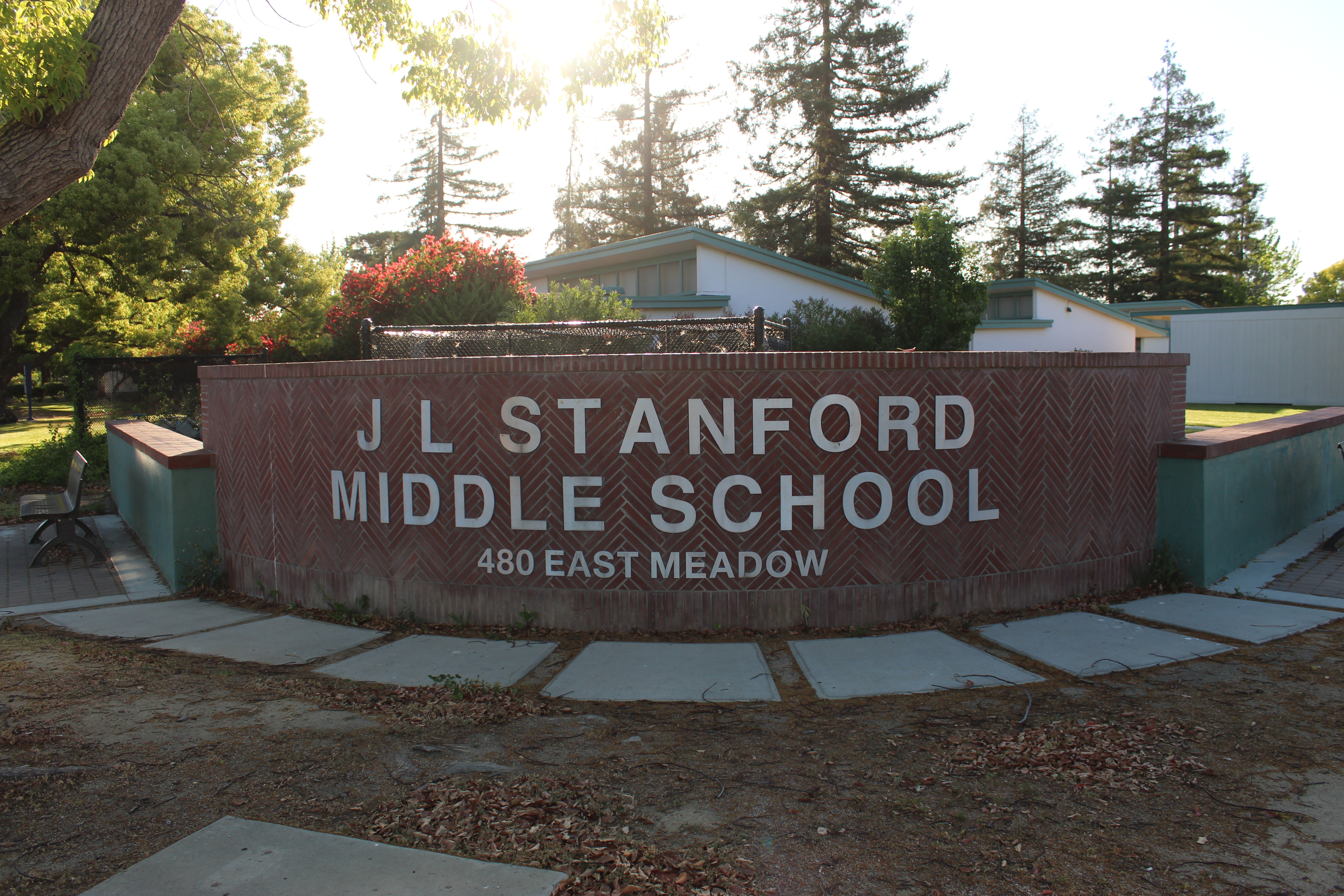
J. L. Stanford Middle School

Jane Lathrop Stanford Middle School, formerly Ray Lyman Wilbur Junior High School and known locally as JLS, is located at 480 East Meadow Dr., Palo Alto, CA 94306. The school mascot is the Panther.

The 2018–19 school year had 1,137 students in attendance. The student population was 54% male and 46% female. Its racial makeup was 44% Asian, 32% Caucasian, 12% Hispanic, 1% African American, and 11% Other (including multiple races).

The land that Jane Lathrop Stanford Middle School and the adjoining Fairmeadow Elementary School now sit on were once owned by three farmers. The farmers sold their land to real estate developer Joseph Eichler, who later donated the land to the district.

Founded in 1953, the school was originally named after Ray Lyman Wilbur, one of the early presidents of Stanford University. After Jordan Middle School closed due to lack of enrollment in 1985, the two schools were merged at the Wilbur school location and it was renamed Jane Lathrop Stanford after Jane Stanford, co-founder with her husband, Leland Stanford, of Stanford University.

=== Fletcher Middle School ===
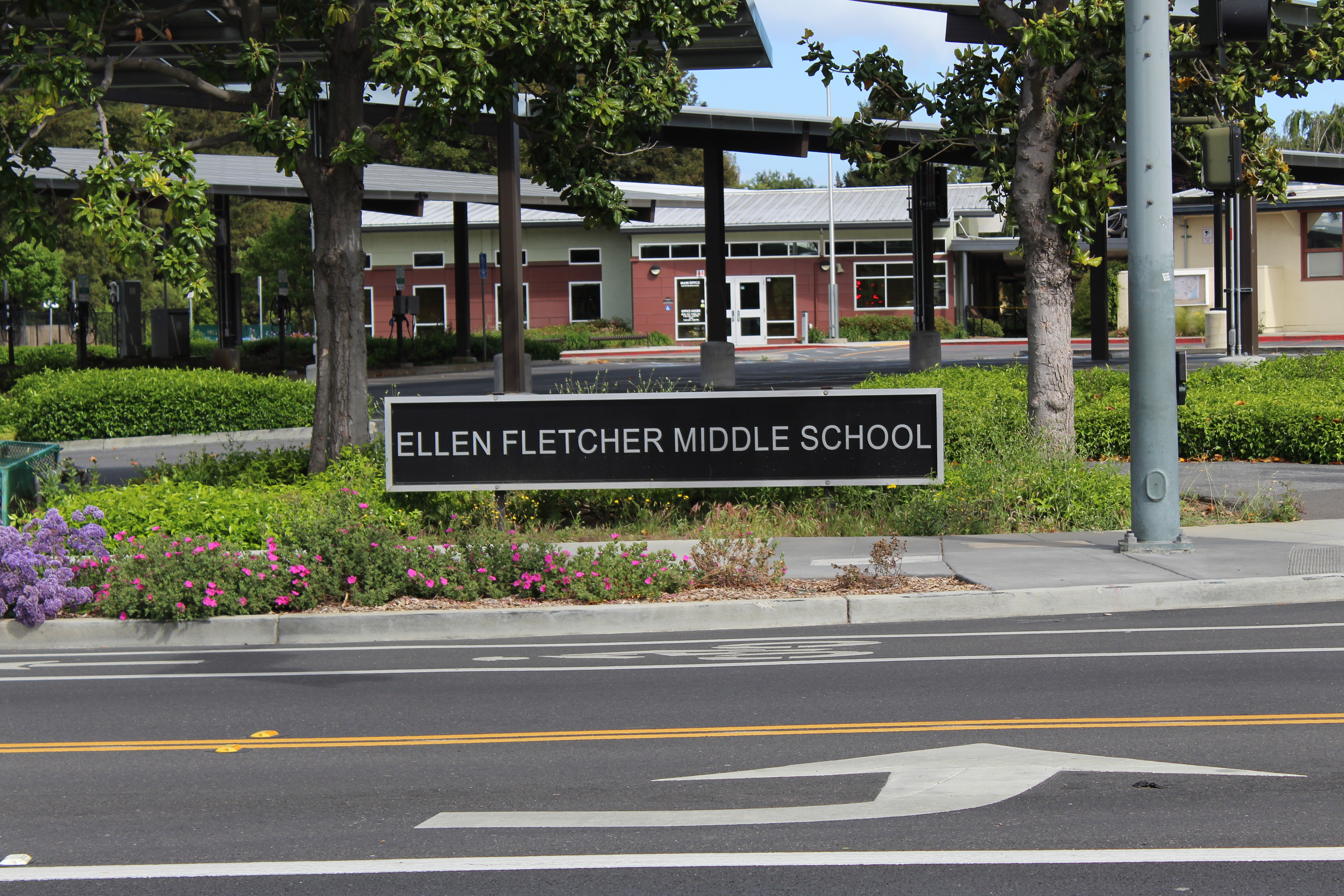
Fletcher Middle School

Ellen T. Fletcher Middle School, formerly Terman Middle School, is located at 655 Arastradero Road in Palo Alto. The school mascot is the tiger.

The 2018–19 school year had 668 students in attendance. The student population was 54% male and 46% female. Its racial makeup was 38% Asian, 30% White, 16% Hispanic, 12% Two or More Races, 1% Black and 1% Native Hawaiian/ Pacific Islander.

The original name of the school located on the site was Terman Junior High School (named after Lewis Madison Terman), unrelated to the school currently at the site. It was closed in 1978 due to declining enrollment in the district. The district placed a new middle school named Terman Middle School at the site in 1999 to deal with rising enrollment. The first school year was 2001–2002. The new school was named after both Terman and his son Frederick Terman, a Silicon Valley pioneer. The relocation was met with great controversy by local residents as the district sought to potentially overtake the land by eminent domain from the residing Jewish Community Center. As a result, land from the Cubberley Community Center was instead traded for the land the district needed at Terman. The JCC continued to lease district land at Cubberley until it made other plans. Beginning in the 2018–2019 school year the school was renamed Ellen T. Fletcher Middle School after a Palo Alto city councilwoman because the elder Terman—like Jordan—espoused eugenics.

== Elementary schools ==
- Addison Elementary School, named after the adjacent street which takes its name from the author Joseph Addison.
- Barron Park Elementary School
- Duveneck Elementary School (formerly Green Gables)
- El Carmelo Elementary School
- Escondido Elementary School
- Fairmeadow Elementary School
- Hoover Elementary School (formerly located on Middlefield Road at Hoover Park, also formerly located at current Barron Park Elementary site)
- Juana Briones Elementary School (formerly Loma Vista)
- Lucille M. Nixon Elementary School
- Ohlone Elementary School (formerly called Ohlones, until 1971, and located on E. Charleston until 1982, where Hoover is now)
- Palo Verde Elementary School (called Sequoyah from 1976 until 1982, when it merged with Los Niños and changed its name back to Palo Verde)
- Walter Hays Elementary School

== Adult school ==
=== Palo Alto Adult School ===
Palo Alto Adult School

Location
- 50 Embarcadero Road; Palo Alto, California 94301; United States

Information
- Motto: Education is for life.
- Established: 1921
- Superintendent: Karen Hendricks
- CEEB code: 052340
- Principal: Dave Hoshiwara
- Age: 18+
- Enrollment: 8,000
- Affiliation: California Adult Schools
- Website: paadultschool.org

The Palo Alto Adult School (PAAS) is a California Adult School established by the Palo Alto Unified School District in 1921. It offers several classes across a number of schools. Its main office is located in the Tower Building at Palo Alto High School. There are no restrictions on enrollment in regards to a student's place of residence or citizenship. English-language-learning and citizenship classes are free, and other classes charge a low fee. Herb Wong, jazz expert and educator, was a teacher at the adult school.

The Palo Alto Adult School is part of the North Santa Clara County Student Transition Consortium (STC), with nearby De Anza College, Foothill College, Mountain View Los Altos Adult Education, and Sunnyvale–Cupertino Adult Education. It has classes at seven locations within the borders of the Palo Alto Unified School District.

== Past schools in the district ==
- Cubberley High School (1956–1979), now the Cubberley Community Center

At its peak in 1967, Palo Alto had 22 K-6 elementary schools. Of those, these schools are closed:

- Crescent Park Elementary School (?–1983), razed for housing development
- De Anza Elementary School - razed for housing development
- Elizabeth Van Auken Elementary School - still stands. Renamed Los Niños Elementary school in 197? until 1982, at which point it merged with (and moved locations to) the former Sequoya school and renamed Palo Verde (see above). Currently the site of the Ohlone Elementary magnet school.
- Garland Elementary School - still stands, currently leased to two private schools (Stratford School and CYES Chinese immersion after-school program). Reopening it as a public elementary school has been proposed in the 2000s and 2010s.
- Greendell Elementary School - still stands, currently operates other school district programs
- Lytton Elementary School (1905 to 1964) - razed for Lytton Gardens Senior Residence Units
- Ortega Elementary School - razed for housing development. Was the site of the Jewish Community Center from 1976 to 1983 before Terman.
- Ross Road Elementary School - razed for housing development. Was the site of the Mayfield Continuation School.
- Mayfield Elementary School - razed for development, now the site of a soccer field. After the elementary school closed, it was used as the original site for the Mayfield Continuation School.
- Ventura Elementary School - now the Ventura Community Center under the Parks and Recreation Department

== School board ==
The Palo Alto Unified Board of Education (often known as the Palo Alto Unified School Board) consists of five members elected at-large. The current members of the school board are Shounak Dharap, Shana Segal, Todd Collins, Jennifer DiBrienza, and Jesse Ladomirak. On November 3, 2020, DiBrienza and Collins were re-elected, while Ladomirak was elected to replace the outgoing Melissa Baten Caswell. Dharap was re-elected in 2022 and Shana Segal joined the board that same election cycle. Terms for the remainder of the board—Collins, DiBrienza, and Ladomirak—expire in 2024.
