= Playwrights' Platform =

Playwrights' Platform is a not-for-profit cooperative organization of playwrights based in Boston, Massachusetts, USA. The organization has been in existence since 1973 and is "the most established and longest-lived playwrights' group in the area". It was founded by writers Steven Lydenberg, Allen Sternfield, and Saul Zachary. It was incorporated with the Commonwealth of Massachusetts in May 1974 as Playwrights' Platform, Inc. The officers were the three founders and Jack Bresnahan. Founding members included actors Paul Guilfoyle, Susan McGinley and Steve Capra.

In its early years, the Platform met at Pine Manor Junior College in the Chestnut Hill area of Boston and staged plays at Pine Manor Junior College, the Boston Center for Adult Education, Boston College, the People's Theater, Falmouth Arts Center, the Publick Theater, and the Church of All Nations on Tremont Street in Boston. Some of the playwrights associated with the Platform in its early years are John O'Brien, Geralyn Horton, John Chatterton, Beverly Creasey, Tanya Contos, Sheldon Feldner, and Janet Neipris.

The Platform has met at various locations through the years, including Massachusetts College of Art, Hovey Players, Lasell College, Boston Playwrights' Theatre, the Cambridge Public Library, and the Woman's Club of Newton Highlands.

== Mission ==
The mission of the Playwrights' Platform is:

- To help playwrights develop their work in a supportive environment of fellow theater artists.
- To help playwrights improve their skill and craft.
- To provide a place where playwrights can network with each other and with other local theater artists.
- To provide a space where new work can be tried, tested, and refined.
- To provide an opportunity for local playwrights to see their work produced on the stage.

== Annual festival ==
Playwrights' Platform showcases its member playwrights' work every year with a Festival of New Plays. Since 2003, the Festival has been staged at the Boston Playwrights' Theatre.

== Famous alumni ==
Playwrights' Platform has had several of its members go on to major success in the worlds of theater, film and television, such as Theresa Rebeck, Kirsten Greenidge, Matt Witten, and Rosanna Yamagiwa Alfaro. A. R. Gurney was a board member in the early years.
