= Art Kuehn =

Canadian gridiron football player (born 1953)

No. 54, 60, 78
- Position: Center

Personal information
- Born: February 12, 1953 (age 73); Victoria, British Columbia, Canada
- Listed height: 6 ft 3 in (1.91 m)
- Listed weight: 257 lb (117 kg)

Career information
- High school: Cubberley (CA)
- College: San Jose State; UCLA
- NFL draft: 1975: 15th round, 384th overall pick

Career history
- Seattle Seahawks (1976–1982); New England Patriots (1983)

Career NFL statistics
- Games played: 100
- Games started: 33
- Fumble recoveries: 4
- Stats at Pro Football Reference

Arthur Bert Kuehn (/kjuːn/ KEWN; born February 12, 1953) is a Canadian former professional American football center in the National Football League (NFL) for the Seattle Seahawks and New England Patriots.

Kuehn was born in Victoria, British Columbia, Canada. He attended high school at Ellwood P. Cubberley High School in Palo Alto, California. He played college football at UCLA. He was selected by the Washington Redskins in the 15th round of the 1975 NFL draft. He never played for the Redskins. Instead, he jumped to the Southern California Sun of the World Football League (WFL) that season. He was selected by the Seattle Seahawks in the 1976 NFL expansion draft. He would go on to play 99 career games (97 of which were for Seattle) from 1976 through 1983. He finished his career with the Memphis Showboats of the United States Football League (USFL), playing two seasons in 1984 and 1985.
