= Cubberley Community Center =

Community center in Palo Alto, California, US

Coordinates: 37.417874°N 122.107544°W

The Cubberley Community Center, known locally as "Cubberley", is a community center in Palo Alto, California, that has been in operation since 1990. It is housed on the campus of the former Ellwood P. Cubberley High School. Space is available for rent by the hour, either one-time or on a regular basis for community related meetings, seminars, social events, dances, theatre performances, music rehearsals and athletic events.

== History ==
The Ellwood P. Cubberley High School opened in the Fall of 1956 and closed in 1979, as a result of budget cuts from California Proposition 13 (1978). Cubberley High School is perhaps best known as the setting of Ron Jones' 1967 social experiment The Third Wave, helping to teach Fascism. The high school was named after Ellwood P. Cubberley, an influential authority in the development of institutionalized education.

The 35-acre property belongs to the Palo Alto Unified School District (PAUSD), and is leased to the City of Palo Alto. The larger remainder of this site, (approx. 39,000 square feet) was leased since 2002 to the Foothill-De Anza College District for the Middlefield Campus of Foothill College, a local community college. However, in 2016 this campus moved to Sunnyvale and with the loss of Foothill College as a tenent, this opened up more rentable space for other community-based organizations.

The site boasts a track, a grassy school "amphitheater," and a gym, now used as sites for public running, recreation, and community athletics respectively.

The Cubberley Community Center has been home to local interest organizations including; a ballroom dancing club, child care services, senior center, wildlife rescue organization, Palo Alto Vineyard Church, a Chinese reading room, kung fu classes, karate lessons, private artist studios, L’Ecole de Danse, the Palo Alto Chamber Orchestra, Bowman School, and many more. The Friends of the Palo Alto Library holds used book sales at Cubberley on the second Saturday of every month and the following Sunday, at three locations on campus. The Cubberley Community Center once hosted rock shows by local bands and touring artists including Buffalo Springfield, Santana, William Penn and His Pals, Cake, Third Eye Blind, blink-182, Daniel Tsai Band, and Frank Black.
