= Candyfreak =

2004 American book by Steve Almond

- First edition
- Author: Steve Almond
- Language: English
- Subject: Candy, candy making, chocolate
- Genre: Non-fiction
- Set in: United States
- Publisher: Algonquin Books
- Publication date: May 1, 2004
- Publication place: United States
- Media type: Print, digital, audio
- Pages: 266
- ISBN: 978-1-56512-421-9 (print)
- OCLC: 53972107

Candyfreak: A Journey Through the Chocolate Underbelly of America is a 2004 non-fiction book written by Steve Almond. It is about a trip that he took in which he searched for candy bars made by small companies. He traveled to factories across the country. It was widely reviewed. It was featured as a "Staff Pick" at Powells.com.

On May 24, 2004, shortly after the book’s publication in print, Highbridge Audio published an audiobook production of Candyfreak, read by Oliver Wyman.

In 2006, Heinemann republished the book in the UK with the revised title Candyfreak: Confessions of a Chocoholic.
