= Kaberle =

Kaberle is a Czech surname, its female form is Kaberlová. Notable people with the surname include:

- František Kaberle (born 1973), Czech ice hockey player
- František Kaberle Sr. (born 1951), Czech ice hockey player
- Tomáš Kaberle (born 1978), Czech ice hockey player
