= Boston Theater Marathon =

The Boston Theater Marathon (BTM) is a Boston based charity theatre event consisting of 50 plays performed by 50 different theatre companies in 10 hours. Proceeds benefit the Theatre Community Benevolent Fund, which provides financial relief to individual theatre practitioners in Greater Boston and the surrounding areas.

Founders Kate Snodgrass (Artistic Director emeritus of Boston Playwrights' Theatre) and Bill Lattanzi began the BTM to match playwrights with producing theatre companies in hopes of inspiring future collaborations on new plays. More than 1,000 plays have been performed in the BTM since 1999, with about 50 performed each spring. The event is funded in part by the Boston University Center for the Humanities.
