= Michael Finney (journalist) =

American journalist

Michael Finney (journalist) is an American news presenter and talk show host. Finney currently works as a journalist for KPIX.
