= Ellwood Patterson Cubberley =

American educator and eugenicist (1868–1941)

Ellwood Patterson Cubberley (June 6, 1868 – September 14, 1941) was an American educator, a eugenicist, and a pioneer in the field of education management. He spent most of his career as a professor and later served as the first dean of the Stanford University Graduate School of Education in California.

== Biography ==
Cubberley, who was born in Andrews, Indiana, was the son of Edwin Blanchard Cubberley and Catherine C. Biles. He graduated from Indiana University Bloomington in 1891 after studying physics.

He began his career in education teaching in the one-room schoolhouse in Rock Hill, Indiana. He then took a position as a science professor at Ridgeville College (which closed in 1901) and Vincennes University.

He served as president of Vincennes University from 1893 until 1896.

On June 15, 1892, he married Helen Van Uxem, a fellow student he had met at Indiana University. He was superintendent of schools in San Diego, California from 1896 until 1898. He joined the faculty of Stanford, then went to Columbia University where he earned a Ph.D. in 1905. He returned to the Stanford faculty in 1906 as a professor of education. He was the dean of the Stanford school of education from 1917 until he retired in 1933. Much of his work on "educational efficiency" was tied to the idea of eugenic intelligence, and in his work, he propagated racist views about fundamentally lower intelligence in non-white races.

== Work & influence ==
For much of the 20th century, the dominant historiography of schooling in America was exemplified by Cubberley. His many textbooks emphasized the rise of American education as a powerful force for literacy, democracy, and equal opportunity, and a firm basis for higher education and advanced research institutions. He advocated enlightenment and modernization over ignorance, cost-cutting, and traditionalism in which parents tried to block their children's intellectual access to the wider world. Teachers dedicated to the public interest, reformers with a wide vision, and public support from the civic-minded community were the heroes. The textbooks helped inspire students to become public school teachers and thereby fulfill their own civic mission. Cubberley was perhaps the most significant theorist of educational administration of his day. At the outset of Cubberley's career, school administration had no theoretical or scientific basis. There were no formal textbooks from which to teach educational administration; educational administrators were expected to learn solely from experience. Indeed, educational administration posts were often political plums requiring little, if any, formal training in education. Most universities lacked education departments.

Cubberley pioneered the use of the school survey as an instrument to improve education, in his reports on the schools in Baltimore, Maryland; New York City; Oakland, California; Portland, Oregon; and Salt Lake City, Utah. In conducting surveys, he applied an integrated theory of organization, administration, and teaching, to assess the strengths and weaknesses of individual schools. He used the latest statistical and quantitative methods. His surveys were significant steps down a new road toward improving school functions. Cubberley's work influenced the establishment of the factory model of curriculum implemented widely throughout North America well into the 21st century.

Cubberley's academic legacy has been controversial. Since his death in 1941, Cubberley's impact has been attacked, most memorably by Lawrence Cremin's The Wonderful World of Ellwood Patterson Cubberley (1965). Some academicians have used Cubberley's methodology as a cautionary tale and termed his approach anachronistic and evangelistic, and some of his administration stances have been attacked as sexist and autocratic.

The Ellwood Patterson Cubberley Papers, 1886-1965 (3.25 linear ft.) are housed in the Department of Special Collections and University Archives in the Stanford University Libraries.

== Recognition ==
- The Cubberley Education Library at Stanford University is named for him, as is Cubberley Auditorium in the Stanford School of Education.
- Ellwood P. Cubberley High School (1956–1979) in Palo Alto, California was named for him; the site of the former school now houses the Cubberley Community Center.
- Elementary schools in San Diego and Long Beach, California, are named for him.

== Selected publications ==
Cubberley published a total of 30 works during his life, including:

- Syllabus of Lectures on the History of Education, 1902 online
- Changing conceptions of education (Houghton Mifflin Company, 1909) online
- Public Education in the United States, 1919 online
- The history of education: Educational practice and progress considered as a phase of the development and spread of western civilization (Houghton Mifflin, 1920) online
- Readings in the History of Education, 1920 online
- A Brief History of Education, 1922 online
- Public School Administration, 1922 online
- Public Education in the United States, republished in 1947
- State and county educational reorganization; the revised constitution and school code of the state of Osceola, 1914 online
