= Boston Playwrights' Theatre =

Theater and theater company in Boston, Massachusetts, United States

Coordinates: 42.3517°N 71.1187°W

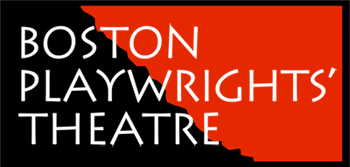
- Interactive map of Boston Playwrights' Theatre
- Address: 949 Commonwealth Avenue; Boston, Massachusetts; United States
- Owner: Boston University
- Type: Regional theater
- Public transit: Babcock Street

Construction
- Opened: 1981

Website
- www.bostonplaywrights.org

Boston Playwrights' Theatre (BPT) is a small professional theatre in Boston, Massachusetts and the home of Boston University's MFA Playwriting Program. As a venue, BPT rents its space for the rehearsal, reading, and production of new plays.

== History ==
BPT was founded in 1981 by Nobel laureate Derek Walcott when he began teaching poetry and playwriting at Boston University. Under the leadership of Walcott's student Kate Snodgrass, the program expanded from a one-year Master of Arts to a three-year Master of Fine Arts degree. The program's alumni have been produced in regional and New York houses, as well as in London's West End.

In 2022, Kate Snodgrass retired as artistic director after 35 years of working at Boston University. Megan Sandberg-Zakian succeeded her as BPT's artistic director and playwright Nathan Alan Davis as the head of the MFA Playwriting Program. The building's front theater was subsequently dedicated the Kate Snodgrass Stage; the proscenium-style theater at the rear of the building—BPT's original performance space—is the Derek Walcott Stage.

== Partnership with Boston University ==
In 2014, Boston Playwrights' Theatre produced its first season of thesis plays by current MFA candidates under the name @Play Festival of New Work in collaboration with Boston University. In 2016, Boston Playwrights' Theatre made official this partnership with Boston University's School of Theatre and the BU Graduate School of Arts & Sciences on a series of MFA Playwriting thesis plays acting as a showcase for pieces written by graduating students in BU's MFA playwriting program. BPT now collaborates closely with much onstage and backstage talent provided by students in BU's theater school, who work with the playwrights throughout the year.

In alternating seasons, Boston Playwrights’ Theatre will resume its practice of featuring three plays, written by alumni or faculty of the program and employing professional actors, designers and playwrights to stage them.

== See also ==
- Playwrights' Platform
