= Palo Alto High School =

Location
- 50 Embarcadero Road; Palo Alto, Santa Clara, California 94301; United States; 37°26′13″N 122°09′25″W

Information
- School type: Public, comprehensive high school
- Founded: 1898
- School district: Palo Alto Unified School District
- Oversight: Western Association of Schools and Colleges, Accrediting Commission for Schools
- Superintendent: Herb Espiritu
- CEEB code: 052350
- Principal: Brent Kline
- Staff: 114.83 (FTE)
- Grades: 9–12
- Enrollment: 1,932 (2023–2024)
- Student to teacher ratio: 16.82
- Colors: Green & White
- Mascot: Vikings
- Newspaper: The Campanile
- Feeder schools: Greene Middle School; JLS Middle School
- Website: www.paly.net
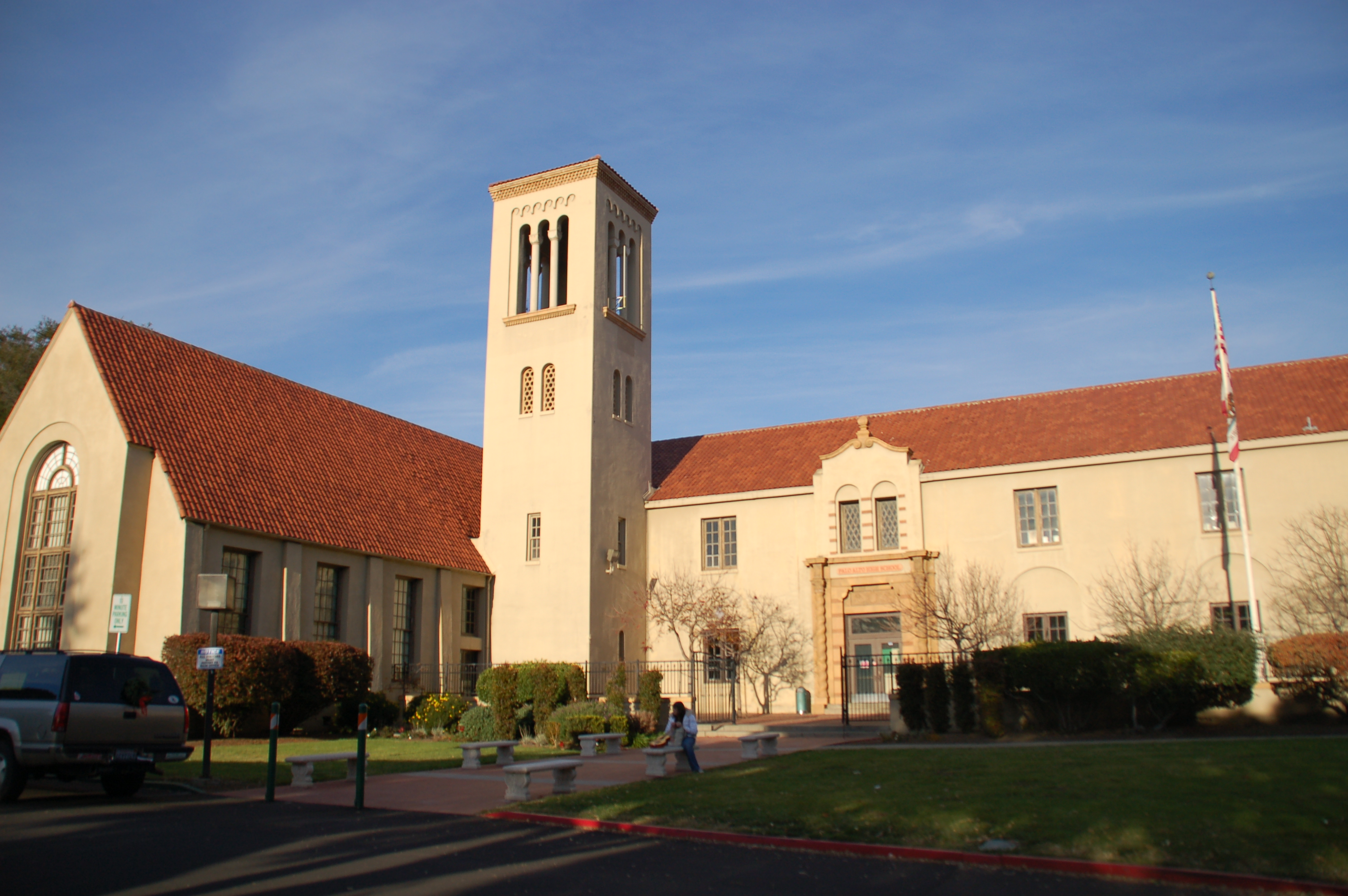

Palo Alto Senior High School (commonly referred to locally as "Paly") is a comprehensive public high school in Palo Alto, California. Operated by the Palo Alto Unified School District, the school is one of three high schools in the district, the others being Gunn High School and an alternative high school, Palo Alto Middle College.

Palo Alto High School was originally established as a private school in 1894. The school was later established as a public school four years later, and a new campus was built in 1918. The school's property is adjacent to Stanford University, who provided the land for the school.

The school admits roughly 500 students each year and features various extracurriculars, including a variety of student-led publications, glassblowing, robotics, and a theater program. It is a two-time National Blue Ribbon School.

== History ==
Palo Alto Senior High School initially opened in 1894 as a private school. At the time of its opening, the school consisted of 24 students to 3 teachers. The school would later become a public school in 1918. Classes were initially held in the Channing Avenue Grammar School; a three-room high school was later built using funds from a trustee. An expanded campus began construction in 1917 and finished construction by December 1918.

== Demographics ==
2021–22

- 2,010 students: 1,042 Male (51.8%), 968 Female (48.2%)

White	Asian	Hispanic	Two or More Races	African American	Pacific Islander	Filipino	American Indian or Alaska Native	Not Reported
423	389	132	80	15	8	8	3	0
41.7%	34.7%	12.9%	7.6%	1.3%	0.7%	0.7%	0.3%	0%

2015–16

- 1,994 students: 982 Male (49.6%), 1004 Female (50.4%)

White	Asian	Hispanic	Two or More Races	African American	Pacific Islander	Filipino	American Indian	Not Reported
976	602	187	109	66	21	20	13	0
48.9%	30.2%	9.4%	5.5%	3.3%	1.1%	1%	0.7%	0%

=== Standardized testing ===
Advanced Placement (AP) Testing for 2018–19
AP Test Taking Students: 908
1	2	3	4	5
20	85	280	583	1140

ACT Scores for 2018–19
ACT Test Taking Students: 231
English Average	Reading Average	Math Average	Science Average
28	28	28	28

SAT Scores for 2014–2015
	Critical Reading Average	Math Average	Writing Average
Palo Alto High	720	709	725
District	634	671	634
Statewide	489	500	484

2013 Academic Performance Index
2009 Base API	2013 Growth API	Growth in the API from 2009 to 2013
901	905	4

== Student media ==
In October 2014, a new Media Arts Center (MAC) was unveiled at Paly. The MAC is the hub of journalism at Palo Alto High School.

=== Year-round student publications ===
These publications have a dedicated class associated with them.

- The Campanile is the high school's newspaper. It prints 24 broadsheet pages once every three weeks. The Campanile has been in the National Scholastic Press Association Hall of Fame since 2004, and has also won four Pacemaker awards as well as a West regional award for editorial excellence from Time.
- C Magazine is the high school Arts and Culture Magazine. C Magazine has won a Gold Crown award from Columbia Scholastic Press Association in 2015 and 2016.
- Verde is Paly's school magazine publication, founded in 1999. It is published five times each year and available online. Verde has won Pacemaker and Gold Crown awards for scholastic journalism, including the 2005 Gold Crown award in the Newspaper category. In 2006, Verde won the Best in Show at National Journalism Convention held in San Francisco. In 2008, Verde was one of four newsmagazines awarded the Pacemaker award from the National Scholastic Press Association. In 2023, Verde was named Best in Show in the Newsmagazine category for schools with 1,800 or more students.
- Viking is Paly's sports magazine publication, published five times each year and available online. Founded in 2007, Viking was the first publication at the high school level to solely cover athletics in the country. It won the National Scholastic Press Association's Student Journalist Impact Award in 2008.
- The Paly Voice, launched in 2003, is Paly's online news publication. In the spring of 2005, the site won both the People's Voice and Overall Webby Award in the "Student" category. In 2026, Paly Voice editor-in-chief Ava Knapp was named Journalism Education Association’s 2026 California Journalist of the Year.
- InFocus is Paly's broadcast TV news program, founded in 1998.
- Madrono, the Palo Alto High School yearbook founded around 1918, has won numerous awards; one of the most prestigious being a gold medalist for the Columbia Scholastic Press Association. It published its 103rd issue in 2022.

=== Additional student publications ===
These publications are clubs but do not have a dedicated class.

- Proof is Paly's arts and entertainment magazine. It was first published second semester of the 2009–10 school year.
- Agora is Paly's foreign affairs magazine. First published in 2012, it is the first high school foreign affairs publication in the country. It publishes once a semester.
- Littera is Paly's club literary magazine. The club was created in the fall of 2018. It publishes an online issue every semester.

== Athletics ==
Titles won by teams from Palo Alto High School range from CIF State Championships in Boys Varsity Basketball in 1993 and 2006, a football Division I state championship in 2010, volleyball Division I state championships in 2010 and 2011, to CCS Championships in Football in 1995, 2006, 2007, 2010, 2022, and 2023 and countless CCS titles in other sports. In 2010, both the Boys and Girls Lacrosse teams won the inaugural Santa Clara Valley Athletic League Championships.

Paly has 25 varsity teams, including football, swimming, as well as badminton, softball, basketball, track and field/cross country running, golf, lacrosse, women's flag football, soccer, tennis, volleyball, water polo, field hockey, ice hockey, and wrestling teams. The schools football team suffered an awful 0-10 campaign in 2025 which resulted in the firing of the head coach. The school is also home to several athletic clubs, including an Ultimate Frisbee Club.

== Notable alumni ==
=== Academics ===
- Douglas Hofstadter (1961), professor of cognitive science and author
- James Josh Snodgrass (1991), Biological anthropologist and professor

=== Art & Design ===
- Jeremy Anderson (attended 1940s), sculptor, professor of art
- Birge Clark (1910), architect
- Tom Franco (1998), artist

=== Athletics ===
- Davante Adams (2011), NFL football player
- Rink Babka (1954), Olympic medalist discus thrower
- Henry Bolte (2022), Major League Baseball player
- Jim Harbaugh (1982), NFL football player and coach
- Peter Hansen (1997), NFL football coach
- KeeSean Johnson (2014), NFL football player
- Morris Kirksey (1913), Olympic champion sprinter and rugby player
- Jeremy Lin (2006), NBA basketball player
- Jim Loscutoff (1948), NBA basketball player
- Hank Norberg, NFL football player
- Teresa Noyola (2008), NWSL soccer player
- Joc Pederson (2010), Major League Baseball player
- Stu Pederson (1978), Major League Baseball player
- Dave Schultz (1977), Olympic and World Champion freestyle wrestler
- Mark Schultz (1978), Olympic and World Champion freestyle wrestler
- Les Steers (1937), NCAA champion high jumper
- Dink Templeton (1915), multi-sport athlete, Olympic champion rugby player, and track & field coach
- Lily Zhang (2014), Olympic table tennis player

=== Business & Politics ===
- Charles Brenner (1961), APL implementer and forensic mathematician
- Ron Christie (1987), Republican political strategist
- Allan Hoover (1925), financier, son of President Herbert Hoover
- Jon Huntsman, Sr. (1955), billionaire founder of Huntsman Corporation
- Bill Lane, Sunset magazine publisher, American diplomat, and philanthropist
- Richard Peery (1957), real estate developer and philanthropist
- Tom Ritchey (1975), cycling engineer and pioneer of the mountain bike (Ritchey Design)
- Joe Simitian (1970), California State Assemblyman (2000–04),California State Senator (2004–12)
- Ron Wyden (1967), U.S. Senator from Oregon (1996– )

=== Literature & Journalism ===
- Lisa Brennan-Jobs (1996), writer and daughter of Steve Jobs
- Tim Dickinson (1992), political journalist (Rolling Stone, Mother Jones)
- Karen Joy Fowler (1968), author (The Jane Austen Book Club)
- Erle Stanley Gardner (1909), detective fiction author, creator of Perry Mason
- Ariel Gore, writer, she attended for two years and has written about the experience.
- John Markoff (1967), New York Times journalist and author
- Téa Obreht (2002), novelist (The Tiger's Wife)
- Hal Plotkin (1975), journalist and activist
- Keith Raffel (1968), technology executive, novelist, nationally syndicated columnist, US Senate aide
- Lew Welch, Beat poet, educator, and writer
- Tad Williams (1975), science fiction/fantasy author (Memory, Sorrow, and Thorn, Otherland, Shadowmarch)

=== Music ===
- Joan Baez (1958), folk singer
- Ron "Money-B" Brooks (1987), rapper (Digital Underground)
- Whitfield Crane (1986), rock singer (Ugly Kid Joe)
- Bill Kreutzmann (1965), drummer (Grateful Dead)
- Cory Lerios (1969), musician, founding member of Pablo Cruise
- Ron "Pigpen" McKernan (1963), musician (Grateful Dead) (didn't graduate)
- Luke Paquin (1996), guitarist (Hot Hot Heat)
- Grace Slick (1958), rock singer (Jefferson Airplane) (attended 1–2 years, but graduated from Castilleja)
- Christopher Tin (1994), Grammy Award-winning composer
- Molly Tuttle (2010), Grammy Award-winning Bluegrass musician
- Remi Wolf (2014), Pop/funk singer-songwriter and former reality TV contestant

=== Television & Film ===
- Aarón Díaz (2001), actor and model (Quantico)
- Dave Feldman (1983), sportscaster (CSN Bay Area)
- Dave Franco (2003), actor (Scrubs, 21 Jump Street, Now You See Me)
- James Franco (1996), actor (Spider-Man trilogy, Pineapple Express, Milk, 127 Hours)
- Charles Haid (1961), actor (Hill Street Blues, Third Watch) and director (ER, Criminal Minds)
- Ollie Johnston (1930), Academy Award-winning Disney animator (Snow White and the Seven Dwarfs, Fantasia)
- Rob Minkoff (1980), film director and animator (The Lion King, Stuart Little)
- Jesse Moss (1988), documentary filmmaker
- Bill Pidto (1983), sportscaster (ESPN, MSG Network)
- Rosalind Ross (2008), screenwriter, film director and equestrian
- Tom Stern (1964), Oscar-nominated cinematographer (Million Dollar Baby, Mystic River, Changeling)
- Kirk Wise (1981), film director/animator (Beauty and the Beast, Atlantis: The Lost Empire)

=== Other ===
- Joe Sebok (1995), professional poker player
- Jan Zobel (1964), accountant and LGBTQ community organizer in Bay Area

== See also ==
- Gunn High School, Palo Alto
- Palo Alto Middle College, Palo Alto high school on the Foothill College campus
- Cubberley High School, Palo Alto
