= California Adult Schools =

Location
- California; United States

District information
- Type: Public
- Motto: Learning for Life
- Schools: 340

Students and staff
- Students: 1.2 million

Other information
- Website: californiaadultschools.org

California Adult Schools are schools part of a California School District that are specifically for adults, also known as an Adult Education Program. California Adult Schools are defined by California Education Code. California Adult Schools are intended to provide elementary and secondary (k-12) level academic and vocational education to adult learners (18 years and older). Teachers in California adult schools must have a California Designated Subjects Teaching Credential in Adult Education issued by the California Commission on Teacher Credentialing.

== History ==
The first recorded adult school in California was in San Francisco in 1856. Evening classes were taught in the basement of old St. Mary's church. Subjects include adult literacy, drafting and bookkeeping. John Swett, one of the first volunteer teachers convinced the board to make the program tuition free.

By the end of the 19th century, adult evening schools had also been set up in Sacramento, Oakland, San Jose, and Los Angeles. These were called Americanization Centers.
