= Innocence (Fitzgerald novel) =

1986 novel by Penelope Fitzgerald

- First edition cover
- Author: Penelope Fitzgerald
- Language: English
- Published: 1986
- Publisher: Collins
- Publication place: United Kingdom
- Pages: 224

Innocence is a 1986 novel by the British author Penelope Fitzgerald. Set in 1950s Italy, it follows the relationship and marriage of the 17-year-old daughter of an old but impoverished aristocratic family and a young neurologist who has resolved never to be emotionally dependent upon anyone. Innocence is the first of a group of four historical novels written by Fitzgerald at the end of her career.

== Plot ==
The Ridolfis are an old aristocratic Florentine family. Formerly rich and influential, they have in recent years been reduced to near poverty. One family eccentricity that has been passed down the centuries is said to be an inclination towards rash decisions, but always taken with the best of intentions to ensure the happiness of others. In 1955, the family consists of Count Giancarlo Ridolfi; Chiara, his guileless 17-year-old daughter, described as ‘alert and reckless’; his older sister Maddalena, who has set up a refuge for the unwanted old people and orphans of Florence; and his nephew Cesare, who leads a solitary life running the family farm and speaking to almost no one.

Chiara attends a concert where she meets the young neurologist Dr Salvatore Rossi, a man who constantly misreads people and responds with rude irritation to the most innocent of comments. Repelled by his upbringing in the small Southern Italian town of Mazzata, and by his father’s hero-worship of the pre-war Communist leader Antonio Gramsci, Rossi has resolved never to be emotionally dependent upon anyone. The meeting affects both parties deeply. Chiara goes back to England to finish her education at her English convent school, and on her return to Italy visits Rossi at work. He receives her rudely, having spent the last few months obsessively trying to put her out of his mind.

Chiara asks her blundering English schoolfriend Barney come to Florence to help, explaining that Rossi doesn’t realise that he wants to see her. Barney arranges a dinner party at which Chiara and Rossi can meet, but Chiara decides not to go, and Rossi leaves when he learns she will not be coming. The two meet at the Ridolfi’s villa nearby and, after an argument, go inside to one of the empty bedrooms and make love. They decide to marry.

Rossi travels South to sell an inherited plot of land. He is accosted by an old friend of his father’s, the Communist Pericle Sannazzaro, who tells him that as an intellectual he has a duty to keep his land and live in Mazzata. Rossi ignores him. Back in Florence, he visits his mistress, Marta, to tell her that he is to be married and that his arrangement with her must end. Marta, a dressmaker, takes the opportunity to make some money by visiting Chiara (who does not know who she is) and offering to make her wedding dress. On the evening after the wedding, Rossi discovers who has made the dress. He grabs it from Chiara's hands and, with his new wife helping innocently but wildly, tears it to pieces. Barney unexpectedly arrives from England to pursue her own romantic dreams. Believing that Rossi does not like her, she tells Chiara she is staying with some friends.

Chiara and Rossi settle down 'to their own system of misunderstanding' and constantly quarrel, 'but not so successfully as they made love'. (Note: Part 2, chapters 18 and 15) After Chiara miscarries, she decides to spend a few weeks with some friends by the sea, recuperating.

Sannazzaro travels to Florence, still singlemindedly determined to persuade Rossi to do his duty by repurchasing his land and moving South. Unable to speak to Rossi in person, he leaves his message with Maddalena. Full of good intentions, she decides to help the couple by instructing her lawyer to buy the land and give it back to Rossi as a gift. When Rossi reads the draft document he is horrified. It instantly becomes clear to him that Chiara had known all about Marta and was taking pity on him by ordering the dress; that she had asked Barney to stay elsewhere to make it known publicly that he had no fit place for her to stay; and that she had persuaded her aunt to buy back the land just to keep him quiet. Even at age nineteen, he reasons, Chiara knows 'how to cut down a grown man'.

Rossi visits Cesare at the farm and asks to borrow a gun, intending suicide. Cesare supplies him with one. The telephone rings; it is Chiara. Rossi puts the gun back and tells Cesare that he will be leaving for the seaside in the morning.

== Principal characters ==
- Count Giancarlo Ridolfi: head of the Ridolfi family
- Chiara Ridolfi: Giancarlo’s daughter
- Cesare Ridolfi: Giancarlo’s nephew; farmer
- Maddalena Ridolfi: Giancarlo’s sister
- Dr Salvatore Rossi: neurologist
- Lavinia ('Barney') Barnes: English schoolfriend of Chiara
- Marta: dressmaker and mistress of Salvatore Rossi
- Pericle Sannazzaro: old Communist friend of Rossi’s father
- Antonio Gramsci: Marxist writer and pre-war Communist leader

== Background ==
Penelope Fitzgerald was almost 70 when Innocence was published in 1986. It was the first of her late-career group of four historical novels (the others being The Beginning of Spring, The Gate of Angels and The Blue Flower) in which she moved away from stories rooted in her own personal experience, to explore other countries and other times.

Italy was a country for which the author had strong feelings, her late husband Desmond having fought there during the War, and the couple having spent their honeymoon there in 1949. They visited many times afterwards, and Fitzgerald made an emotional solo visit in 1976 as Desmond was dying, at his insistence.

== Critical reception ==
Innocence was mostly well-reviewed when it appeared in 1986, though several reviewers were negative or condescending. Philip Howard in The Times said it had "the sort of whimsical perceptions you would expect" while Charles Hawtree in The Daily Telegraph considered the prose to be "careless". Other more wide-ranging reviews took a very different view. John Gross in The New York Times was enthusiastic, calling the book "as satisfying as it is entertaining", and the author "an attractive writer with a fine sense of irony and an unostentatious sense of style". Anne Duchêne in the Times Literary Supplement praised Fitzgerald's "very funny, warm and gently ironic" writing that displays "tremendous physical presence both in surface-textures and sensuousness". C. K. Stead in The London Review of Books had the sense that nothing we are told is insignificant, and that the book has, not opacity, but density.

In his 2004 study, Understanding Penelope Fitzgerald, Peter Wolfe called the book complex, strange, absurd and painful. Julian Barnes, in a 2013 introduction to the novel, referenced Fitzgerald's interest in innocence, not as the usual passive characteristic, but rather as a practical approach to dealing with the world, with an active application in the pursuit of happiness. He considered the author 'daring' to describe the evidently besotted relationship between Chiara and Rossi almost wholly in terms of their arguments and misunderstandings.

== Bibliography ==
- Lee, Hermione (2013). Penelope Fitzgerald: A Life. London: Chatto & Windus. ISBN 9780701184957.
- Wolfe, Peter (2004). Understanding Penelope Fitzgerald. Columbia: University of South Carolina Press. ISBN 1-57003-561-X.
