= David Leavitt =

American writer (born 1961)

- Born: June 23, 1961 (age 65); Pittsburgh, Pennsylvania, US
- Education: Yale University (BA)
- Occupations: Short story writer; novelist; essayist; professor
- Writing career
- Notable works: Family Dancing, The Lost Language of Cranes, While England Sleeps
- Literary movement: Minimalism, Gay literature

David Leavitt (/ˈlɛvɪt/; born June 23, 1961) is an American novelist, short story writer, and biographer.

== Biography ==
Leavitt was born in Pittsburgh, Pennsylvania to Gloria and Harold Leavitt. Harold was a professor who taught at Stanford University and Gloria was a political activist. Leavitt grew up in Palo Alto, California, and graduated from Yale University with a B.A. in English in 1983. After his first book's success, he spent much of the 1990s living in Italy working and restoring an old house in Semproniano in Tuscany with his partner. He has also taught at Princeton University.

While a student at Yale, Leavitt published two stories in The New Yorker, "Territory" and "Out Here", both of which were included in his first collection, Family Dancing (nominated for the National Book Critics Circle Award and finalist for the PEN/Faulkner Award). Other published fiction includes the short-story collections A Place I've Never Been, Arkansas: Three Novellas and The Marble Quilt and the novels The Lost Language of Cranes, Equal Affections, While England Sleeps (finalist for the Los Angeles Times Fiction Prize), The Page Turner, Martin Bauman, The Body of Jonah Boyd and The Indian Clerk (finalist for the PEN/Faulkner Award and shortlisted for the IMPAC Dublin Award).

In 2000, Leavitt moved to Gainesville, Florida, and became a member of the Creative Writing faculty at the University of Florida as well as the founder and editor of the literary journal Subtropics.

Leavitt, who is gay, has frequently explored gay issues in his works. As a teenager, he was frequently frightened by gay novels that emphasized the ideal male body. He found this theme, and its suggestion that homoerotic fulfillment was reserved for the exceptionally beautiful young men, intrusive. His writing explores universal themes such as complex family relationships and class and sex exploitation. Illness and death are also recurrent themes in his work, inspired by his experience with his mother's cancer and death when he was growing up.

Leavitt's 2004 novel The Body of Jonah Boyd is dedicated to the Palo Alto house he grew up in, 743 Cooksey Lane. This house has since then gained notoriety for being the site of the fraudster Sam Bankman-Fried's house arrest.

For his second work of nonfiction (after 2003's Florence, a Delicate Case), Leavitt wrote a biography about Alan Turing called The Man Who Knew Too Much: Alan Turing and the Invention of the Computer, which was published in 2006. Ten years later, in 2016, Leavitt discussed Alan Turing on an episode of Ancient Aliens about mathematical visionaries.

Despite writing many novels, Leavitt has said he feels more confident as a short story writer. He has been criticized for writing too quickly, which he attributes to early experiences with death convincing him that his life as a writer would be short. His work has been considered minimalist as well as part of the literary Brat Pack, but he has made "a fierce effort to disassociate" himself from both. He considers his works too long, emotional and descriptive to be minimalist.

Leavitt's favorite novelist is Penelope Fitzgerald, his favorite works of hers being The Beginning of Spring, The Gate of Angels and The Blue Flower. He has also been influenced by John Cheever, Alice Munro, Cynthia Ozick, Joseph Roth, W. G. Sebald, and Grace Paley, whom he credits for teaching him the importance of humble experiences in great fiction.

In 2022 in Italy, Leavitt was awarded the career-spanning Orbotello Book Prize as well as the Premio Nino Gennaro at the Sicilia Queer International New Visions Film Fest.

== Copyright suit ==
In 1993, the English poet Stephen Spender sued Leavitt for copyright infringement over the publication of his novel While England Sleeps, accusing him of using elements of Spender's memoir World Within World in the novel. Viking-Penguin, Leavitt's publisher at the time, withdrew the book. In 1995, Houghton Mifflin published a revised version with a preface by Leavitt addressing the controversy.

In "Courage in the Telling: The Critical Rise and Fall of David Leavitt," Drew Patrick Shannon argues that the critical backlash that accompanied Spender's suit "allowed [critics] to reinforce the boundaries between gay and mainstream literature that Leavitt had previously crossed." Subsequent reviews of Leavitt's work were more favorable. The episode provided Leavitt with the basis for his novella The Term-Paper Artist.

== Adaptations ==
Two of Leavitt's novels have been filmed: The Lost Language of Cranes (1991) was directed by Nigel Finch and The Page Turner (released under the title Food of Love) was directed by Ventura Pons. The rights to a third, The Indian Clerk, have been optioned by Scott Rudin.

== Writings ==
=== Collections ===
- Family Dancing (1984)
- A Place I've Never Been (1990)
- Arkansas (1997)
- The Marble Quilt (2001)

=== Novels ===
- The Lost Language of Cranes (1986)
- Equal Affections (1989)
- While England Sleeps (1993; revised and reissued 1995)
- The Page Turner (1998)
- Martin Bauman (2000)
- Crossing St. Gotthard (2000)
- The Body of Jonah Boyd (2004)
- The Indian Clerk (2007)
- The Two Hotel Francforts (2013)
- Shelter in Place (2020)
- Bright Monday (January 12, 2027)

=== Non-fiction ===
- Florence, A Delicate Case (2003)
- The Man Who Knew Too Much: Alan Turing and the Invention of the Computer (2006)

=== Co-authored and edited collections ===
- The Penguin Book of Gay Short Stories (1993) (editor, with Mark Mitchell)
- Italian Pleasures (1996) (with Mark Mitchell)
- Pages Passed from Hand to Hand: The Hidden Tradition of Homosexual Literature in English from 1748 to 1914 (1997) (editor, with Mark Mitchell)
- In Maremma: Life and a House in Southern Tuscany (2001) (with Mark Mitchell)

=== Anthologies ===
- "Chips Is Here." The Company of Dogs, edited by Michael J. Rosen, Doubleday (1990)
