= Ludwig Koch (sound recordist) =

British broadcaster and wildlife sound recordist

Ludwig Koch MBE
- Born: Paul Ludwig Koch; 13 November 1881; Frankfurt am Main, German Empire
- Died: 4 May 1974 (aged 92); Harrow, London, United Kingdom
- Known for: Recording of wildlife sounds

Ludwig Paul Koch MBE (13 November 1881 – 4 May 1974) was a German born broadcaster and sound recordist. An expert on recording animal sounds, he was exiled to England in 1936, where he played a significant part in increasing the British public's appreciation of wildlife. Koch was appointed as MBE in 1960 in recognition of his contributions to broadcasting and natural history sound.

== Life in Germany ==
Koch was born into a music-loving Jewish family as Paul Ludwig and spent his early years in Frankfurt-am-Main. As a boy violinist he was admitted to Clara Schumann's music circle. Later, he studied singing, and had a short but successful career as a concert singer. This was ended by the outbreak of World War I. As a child he was given an early phonograph and recorded several animals. His 1889 recording of the song of a white-rumped shama (Copsychus malabarica) is the first-known recording of bird song.

Because he spoke fluent French, he joined military intelligence. After the Armistice in 1918, he became chief delegate for repatriation for the French-occupied zone of Germany. He worked for the German government until 1925. In 1928, he was commissioned by the German subsidiary of Electric and Musical Industries (EMI) to start a cultural branch of the gramophone industry; this coincided with a revival of his childhood interest in animals. Thus from 1929, he began recording animal sounds again using up-to-date equipment. He invented the sound-book (now known as multimedia), attaching gramophone records to an illustrated book. The first of these, a collaboration with the German ornithologist Oscar Heinroth, was published in 1935.

In January 1936, Koch went on a lecture tour in Switzerland. His return flight ticket was given to him by Hermann Göring, who, as a bird and animal lover, was a fan of Koch's work. After Koch's last lecture, he was approached by a man who introduced himself as the Third Reich's representative in Switzerland and told him that he had followed Koch's lectures and written a very good report about them. It turned out the man was Wilhelm Gustloff and he was assassinated the following day. Since Koch had been seen speaking to Gustloff just hours beforehand, he became concerned about his return to Germany, fearing that he would be accused of being involved in the assassination. He called the director of his recording company, a Nazi, who told him, "Just stay where you are. The air in Switzerland is much better than in Germany."

== Britain and the BBC ==
Koch then fled to Great Britain, arriving on 17 February 1936. With encouragement from Sir Julian Huxley the ornithologist and publisher Harry Witherby agreed to publish sound-book of British wild birds. In 1936, Songs of Wild Birds was published in collaboration with E.M. Nicholson, followed by two other sound-books by 1938 (More Songs of Wild Birds in 1937 and (with Huxley) Animal Language in 1938). In 1937 he made recordings of the birds in the park of the royal castle in La(e)ken (Belgium) with the aid of queen Elisabeth of Belgium. These recordings were published only in 1952, due to the circumstances of war and the Belgian Royal Question.

After a period of internment in 1941 on the Isle of Man as an enemy alien Koch (with further help from Huxley) joined the European Service of the BBC, where his distinctive yet attractive and rather musical voice, accompanying his sound recordings, soon became familiar to listeners. His sound recordings were acquired by the BBC and established the BBC's library of natural history sound. He never lost his strong German accent. His work was parodied by Peter Sellers. Koch retired in 1951, but continued to make expeditions to record wildlife sounds, visiting Iceland when he was seventy-one.

== Personal life and death ==
Koch married Nellie Sylvia Herz in 1912. They had a son and a daughter, and (after exile), lived at 7, Gordon House, Western Avenue, Ealing, and later at Bird Cottage, 39 Walton Avenue, South Harrow. Nellie died in 1973, aged 82. Koch died a few months later in Harrow at the age of 92. His son Waldemar Koch (1913-2001) studied bassoon at the Royal College of Music from 1938 and changed his name to Valentine Kennedy in 1943. He joined the London Philharmonic Orchestra and Ruth Gipps wrote the piece Leviathan for him in 1969. His daughter Erica Marks (1915-2010) became a photographer specialising in child portraits and pictures of politicians for Diplomat magazine. She also took photographs of her father.

== Legacy ==
Koch was the subject of a 2009 BBC Radio 4 documentary presented by Sean Street, "Ludwig Koch and the Music of Nature". In 2023 he was the subject of BBC Radio 4's biography series Great Lives, in which he was nominated by the musician and sound recordist Chris Watson. In 2025 the documentary film Alarm Notes was released, directed by Koch's granddaughter Anthea Kennedy and her partner Ian Wiblin. It tells the story of Koch in 1930s Berlin and Leipzig, and his later exile in Britain. His recordings and manuscript papers are preserved in the British Library Sound Archive.

== In literature ==
Koch published Memoirs of a Birdman in 1955. His visit to Epping Forest to record badgers is described in A Forest by Night (1965) by Fred Speakman. He is depicted as Dr Vogel in Penelope Fitzgerald’s 1980 novel Human Voices, portrayed as an émigré making a programme called Lest We Forget Our Englishry, travelling around the country recording the wheezy breathing of locals and creaky church doors.

== Discography ==
- Der Wald Erschallt (Verlag Knorr & Hirth, 1934)
- Im gleichen Schritt und Tritt (Verlag Knorr & Hirth, 1934)
- Stolz weht die Flagge (Verlag Knorr & Hirth, 1934)
- Gefiederte Meistersänger, with Oscar Heinroth - 1st edition (Brühlscher Verlag Giessen, 1935)
- Songs of Wild Birds, with E.M. Nicholson (H.F. & G. Witherby, 1936)
- More Songs of Wild Birds, with E.M. Nicholson (H.F. & G. Witherby, 1937)
- Hunting by Ear - 1st edition (H.F. & G. Witherby, 1937)
- Animal Language, with Julian Huxley (Country Life / Parlophone, 1938)
- Les Oiseaux Chanteurs de Laeken (Parlophone, 1952)
- Songs of British Birds (HMV, 1953)
- Ludwig Koch Remembers: 1 (BBC, 1957)
- Ludwig Koch Remembers: 2 (BBC, 1957)
- Hunting by Ear - 2nd edition (H.F. & G. Witherby, 1960)
- A Salute to Ludwig Koch (BBC RED34, 1968)
- Ludwig Koch: Recollections and Recordings (BBC RED66, 1970)

== Sources ==
- John F. Burton. 'Koch, Ludwig Karl', Oxford Dictionary of National Biography (2004, entry revised 2011)
- L. Koch, Memoirs of a Birdman (1955)
- J.F. Burton, ‘Master of nature's music: Ludwig Koch, 1881–1974’, Country Life, 157 (1975), 390–91
- J.F. Burton, ‘Our debt to Ludwig Koch: master of nature's music’, Recorded Sound, 74–5 (1979), 36–7
- C. Tipp, 'With an Ear to the Earth', Slightly Foxed, No. 43, Autumn 2014
- F. J. Speakman, A Forest by Night (1965), p. 45-51
