= Maria Fitzgerald =

British neuroscientist (born 1953)

Maria Fitzgerald FRS FRCA FMedSci
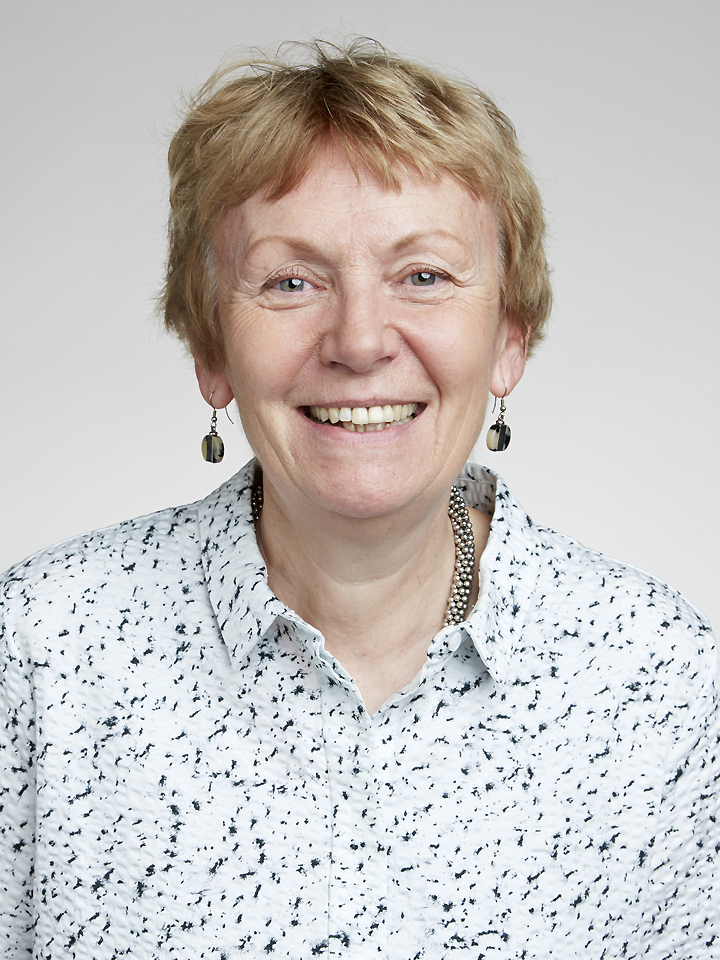
- Fitzgerald in 2016
- Born: 10 April 1953 (age 73)
- Education: Godolphin and Latymer School; University of Oxford; University College London
- Awards: Joan Mott Prize Lecture (1996)
- Scientific career
- Fields: Neuroscience; Pain physiology
- Workplaces: University College London
- Thesis: The sensitisation of cutaneous nociceptors (1978)
- Doctoral advisor: Patrick David Wall
- Website: ucl.ac.uk/npp/research/mfi

Maria Fitzgerald is a British neuroscientist who is a professor in the Department of Neuroscience at University College London.

== Early life and education ==
Maria Fitzgerald was born in Hampstead, London. Her mother was Booker Prize–winning novelist Penelope Fitzgerald, author of the Blue Flower. Her father, Desmond Fitzgerald, was a major in the Irish Guards. Her older brother, Edmund Valpy Fitzgerald, is an emeritus professor in the Oxford Department of International Development. Maria was educated at Godolphin and Latymer School and Lady Margaret Hall, Oxford, where she studied physiology. She was awarded a Bachelor of Arts degree in 1975 from the University of Oxford. She trained in pain physiology and neuroscience with Bruce Lynn and Patrick David Wall at University College London, where she was awarded a PhD in 1978. Maria was awarded her first research grant from the Medical Research Council in 1981, and her research has been continuously supported by the MRC ever since. She was awarded a "new blood lectureship" in the Department of Anatomy at UCL in 1984 and is now Professor of Developmental Neurobiology in the UCL Department of Neuroscience, Physiology and Pharmacology, and a member of UCL Neuroscience.

== Research and career ==
Fitzgerald studies the developmental physiology and neurobiology of nociceptor circuits in the brain and spinal cord. Her work has had a major impact on our understanding of how pain perception emerges in early life and how early pain experience can shape pain sensitivity for life. Fitzgerald's research has changed clinical perception by showing that pain in infancy requires appropriate measurement and treatment and that it should be tailored to the developmental stage of the child.

=== Awards and honours ===
In recognition of her work Fitzgerald was awarded the Jeffrey Lawson Award for Advocacy in Children's Pain Relief from the American Pain Society in 2011, the first basic scientist to have received this award. In 2013 she was elected to the Faculty of Pain Medicine of the Royal College of Anaesthetists for sustained and significant contributions to pain medicine. She was elected a Fellow of the Academy of Medical Sciences (FMedSci) in 2000 and a Fellow of the Royal Society (FRS) in 2016. She has been awarded honorary membership in the International Association for the Study of Pain (IASP), the British Pain Society, the International Society for Pediatric Pain (ISPP) and the Physiological Society. A podcast describing her research career is available on the Pain Research Forum.
