= The Means of Escape =

2000 story collection by Penelope Fitzgerald

- First edition
- Author: Penelope Fitzgerald
- Genre: Short stories
- Publisher: Flamingo
- Publication date: 2000
- Media type: Print
- Pages: 116

The Means of Escape is a 2000 short story collection by Penelope Fitzgerald, published shortly after her death. It was first issued as a series of eight (later eleven) stories, most of which were first published between 1975 and 1998.

== Plots ==
=== "The Means of Escape" ===
The story is set in the mid-19th-century, in the penal colony of Van Diemen's Land. Alice Godley, daughter of the rector of the English Church in Hobart, lives a constrained life working in the local laundry and playing the seraphine in her father's church. She lives quietly at the rectory with her father, two lodgers, and the housekeeper Mrs Watson. Mrs Watson was originally a transported convict who, having served seven years, now has her ticket of leave.

One day, alone in the church, Alice is surprised by an escaped prisoner in felon's clothing and hood who tells her that he is an educated man, a poisoner by the name of Savage. Although fearful, she feels herself attracted to him and agrees to hide him in the church, bringing him food over several days. Savage tells her that he needs women's clothes to make good his escape on the next ship bound for England, and they arrange for him to come to her house under cover of darkness. He tells her that when he reaches England he will invite her to join him. Alice waits expectantly all night, but Savage does not appear.

Eight months later, Alice receives a letter from England. Savage says that in the darkness that night he had mistaken her room, and had accidentally gone into that of Mrs Watson. The housekeeper had welcomed him, provided him with the necessary clothes, and decided on the spur of the moment to accompany him to England herself.

=== "The Axe" ===
The story is narrated by a bureaucratic middle-manager of a small firm, who has been forced by the firm's owner to make his ageing clerical assistant, WS Singlebury, redundant. Singlebury lives alone, has worked for years in the same small cubbyhole, and says that he does not know what he will do if he is forced to leave. A damp smell that has been permeating the office for some time gets worse after Singlebury's departure, becoming a putrid stench.

Returning late at night to his office after accidentally leaving the lights on, the narrator feels a sense of creeping tension. Shuffling along the corridor to his cubbyhole is Singlebury, with his throat cut from ear to ear. The narrator retreats into his office, locks himself in, and sits writing a report on the incident, unable to bring himself to look behind him to see whether there is blood seeping under the door.

=== "The Red-Haired Girl" ===
A group of young English artists travel to Paris in 1882 to practise plein air painting. One of the group, Hackett, searches for a female model and finds at his hotel the ideal candidate: a young red-haired servant girl called Annik, with a blank expression, "built for hard use and hard wear". He engages her, and tells her to come to be painted at specific time, wearing a red shawl. She will be paid once the painting is complete.

Over several sessions, Hackett becomes increasingly frustrated and angry with Annik, not understanding that her poverty means that she has no means of accurately determining the time, has no shawl of her own and no friend from whom she could borrow one. She complains "you don't know what I want, and you don't know what I feel". Hackett realises that he knows nothing of Annik's heart, but his realisation comes too late and Annik has disappeared. Initially he fears that she may have killed herself, but ultimately discovers from one of the servants that she has been dismissed for stealing from the hotel - some money, and a watch.

=== "Beehernz" ===
Hopkins, the artistic director of a music festival, plans to bring back out of retirement an old maestro, Beehernz, for one last Mahler concert. Taking with him Mary, a young soprano, he travels to Beehernz's retreat on a small island off Iona. There they discover Beehernz living alone in an old house with no electricity, no radio, no books, no bookcase, no scores or manuscripts. In the kitchen is a broken piano that makes no sound.

Beehernz is cryptic and evasive, showing little interest in the contract that Hopkins has bought with him, and no interest in Mahler. Overhearing Mary in the kitchen singing German lieder quietly to herself while making the tea, Beehernz insists that she be taken straight back to Iona. Hopkins spends an uncomfortable night in an armchair, and is surprised in the morning to find Beehernz not only dressed but ready to accompany him. Beehernz explains that he has changed his mind, and that he would like to hear Mary sing again: "You see, it is so long since I heard music".

=== "The Prescription" ===
Dr Mehmet Bey, a prosperous Turkish doctor in the Beyazit area of Istanbul, takes on 14-year-old Alecco as an apprentice as an act of compassion. But Mehmet Bey resents the fact that his apprentice is very bright, and as Alecco is of lowly Greek nationality he is not permitted to do anything that would allow him to learn about medicine. After discovering the boy reading his books without permission, an incensed Mehmet Bey forces him to drink a poisoned prescription, which almost kills him. Alecco leaves, and is picked up on the waterfront by a Greek cook who finds him a place on a ship bound for London.

Many years later, Alecco - now an experienced young doctor who has studied with the greatest specialist in Vienna - is asked to provide a second opinion on one of Mehmet Bey's cases. Mehmet Bey listens to Alecco's diagnosis and instantly rejects it, questioning Alecco's honesty and telling him that in spite of all his education his nature cannot not have changed. Alecco withdraws his diagnosis.

=== "At Hiruharama" ===
Tanner travels from England to New Zealand hoping to take up an apprenticeship, but finds that he has to accept a job as a servant. There he meets and courts Kitty, also a servant from England who had had hopes of employment as a governess. Tanner asks Kitty to wait three years, while he saves his wages, and they are then married. Still lacking funds, they settle in Hiruharama, a remote spot in the countryside. Their nearest neighbour, an eccentric man called Brinkman, lives nine or ten miles away. He calls over for dinner once every six months.

Kitty becomes pregnant, and Tanner makes arrangements to summon the doctor via carrier pigeon when she goes into labour. When the doctor arrives, Kitty has already given birth, and he discovers that Tanner has accidentally thrown out the smaller of his twin daughters, mistaking her for the afterbirth. Brinkman arrives for his six-monthly dinner and makes no effort to leave, sitting quietly by the table, smoking his pipe. He reasons that his hosts will have to serve dinner sometime.

=== "Not Shown" ===
Fothergill is employed by Lady P. as a poorly-paid caretaker at Tailfirst farm, an Arts and Crafts building by Philip Webb that is shown to the public on Mondays, Wednesdays and Saturdays. Assisting him are two longstanding rooms stewards. Hearing that Fothergill has recently appointed a disruptive new steward, Mrs Horrabin, Lady P. calls her employee in and instructs him to dispense with her services.

Fothergill's mind returns to the preceding Tuesday when the aggressive and vulgar Mrs Horrabin had arrived unheralded, baldly announcing that she intended to take over from the existing stewards. She had intimated that she knew something disreputable about Fothergill's past, and it became clear that she wanted his job, his peace of mind, and even his body. The caretaker had a narrow escape when Mrs Horrabin's husband called her mobile phone. She was forced to leave but made it clear that she would be back the next day.

Lady P. reassures Fothergill that the poor takings are not his fault, and that the house's great drawback is that nothing interesting ever happens.

=== "The Likeness" ===
Demetrius Christiaki has been trained as a painter in London. In 1880 at the age of 20 Dimi is sent by his father to paint a portrait of an elderly relative, Aunt Calliope, who lives with her great niece Evgenia in Fener, the Greek district of Stanboul. Dimi does not make much progress on the proposed painting, but is invited to meet many of Aunt Calliope's friends at one of her soirées. The next day his aunt asks Dimi whether he has considered marrying Evgenia.

=== "Our Lives Are Only Lent To Us" ===
San Thomás de las Ollas, an old silver-mining town in Mexico, is dominated by English and American incomers whose culture is markedly different from that of the native residents. Mrs Sheridan, widow of one of the mine investors, is benevolently concerned for the family of her Mexican chauffeur, Pantaleón, who has been taking advantage of her to support his dependants. One of his family members is a young mixed-race woman named Esperanta, paternity uncertain, who sells fish in the local market while looking after a new baby. The market burns down, and Esperanta is killed. The Europeans and Americans donate large sums to money to build a new market, while the locals resignedly endure the catastrophe with the nostrum "venimos prestados" – our lives are only lent to us.

=== "Desideratus" ===
On Jack Digby's eleventh birthday his godmother gives him a keepsake, a gilt medal inscribed 'Desideratus' that had been minted on the day of his birth in 1663. He keeps the medal on him always, but one day while standing on a hill overlooking the great house nearby, he drops it. Returning the next day, he finds the medal in a puddle shining beneath thick ice. When the ice melts, the medal is washed down via a drain to the great house itself. Taking his courage in his hands, Jack enquires at the servants' door and is called into the master's presence. He insists that Jack accompanies him upstairs where he finds an apparently lifeless boy lying on a bed with the medal clasped in his outstretched hand. The master takes the medal and returns it to Jack.

=== "Worlds Apart" ===
Hester, whose husband has left her years earlier, lives with her six-year-old daughter Tilly. She starts to develop feelings for her Polish lodger, Ernst, but is quite unable to express herself. Uncertain about Hester's state of mind, and fearful that he may accidentally have offended her, Ernst suggests moving out. Taking matters into her own hands, Tilly fancifully tells Ernst that Hester had lost her husband on 25 October; and on that day Ernst unexpectedly turns up with a bottle of wine by way of comfort and consolation. Angry that her daughter has lied, Hester shouts at him. Ernst pours the wine down the drain and leaves the house. Realising at last that she has to act, Hester chases down the street after him and asks "what are we going to do?" He replies that he is going to take her home.

== Background ==
Fitzerald died in 2000, with the collection being published later the same year. The eight stories of the first edition span Fitzerald's entire career, from her first fictional publication, "The Axe" (1975), to the last published in her lifetime, "The Red-Haired Girl" (1998). Fitzgerald had originally wanted the title of the volume to be Not Shown but was overruled by her US editor. The collection was later expanded to eleven stories.

== Critical reception ==
Welcoming the book's publication in 2000, Ruth Scurr for The Times considered that each of the stories reflected the careful and distinctive hand of a true artist. She felt that the volume would win the author many new admirers. The Observer Review said that the collection showed Fitzgerald "at the top of her form". Adam Mars-Jones noted that all of Fitzgerald's novels are miniatures, making it the more surprising that yet a further reduction of scale should result in stories that are so readable and so sharply tender. Frank Kermode for the London Review of Books praised the author's "wonderfully economical habit", and suggested that although not all these stories have the fineness and fullness of the novels, some of them do have a touch of the same quiet power to astonish. Publishers Weekly called the stories strange, whimsical, gothic and bizarre, demonstrating Fitzgerald's cool and civilized wit and the merciless eye she casts on worldly pretensions. Crisp, with the economical suggestiveness of poetry, each tale ends with a surprising twist. Kirkus Reviews thought that "everything that Fitzgerald touches here, large or small, turns quietly to gold" and that the collection will disappoint readers "only by the fact of its being so slender".

Fitzgerald's 2013 biographer Hermione Lee called the tales "mysterious stories" that are "full of Fitzgerald's unprivileged vulnerable people, making their way in the world with some bewilderment". Although the realities of life include cruelty, indifference, violence, and the exercise of power, the stories are also coloured with Fitzgerald's characteristic tender, funny alertness to human oddity and ordinariness. Just occasionally, she noted, in the author's luminous, dark, unflinching world, people do find ... their means of escape.
