= The Lost Language of Cranes (film) =

- VHS cover
- Genre: Drama; LGBT
- Based on: Novel
- Screenplay by: Sean Mathias
- Directed by: Nigel Finch
- Starring: Brian Cox; Eileen Atkins; Angus Macfadyen; Corey Parker; Cathy Tyson; John Schlesinger; René Auberjonois; Ben Daniels; Nigel Whitmey
- Theme music composer: Julian Wastall
- Country of origin: United Kingdom
- Original language: English

Production
- Executive producers: Kimberly Myers; Mark Shivas
- Producer: Ruth Caleb
- Cinematography: Remi Adefarasin
- Editor: Sue Wyatt
- Running time: 87 minutes
- Production company: BBC

Original release
- Network: BBC Two
- Release: November 1991 (London Film Festival); 9 February 1992 (TV premiere)

The Lost Language of Cranes is a 1991 British made-for-television drama film directed by Nigel Finch. It was adapted for television by Sean Mathias, based on the 1986 novel of the same name by David Leavitt. The film was produced by the BBC for their Screen Two series and aired on 9 February 1992 after being shown at the London Film Festival in November 1991. It stars Brian Cox, Eileen Atkins, Angus Macfadyen, Corey Parker, Cathy Tyson, John Schlesinger, René Auberjonois, Ben Daniels and Nigel Whitmey. Cox was nominated for a British Academy Television Award for Best Actor.

== Synopsis ==
Philip Benjamin is a 20-something middle-class Londoner who works in publishing. Unbeknownst to his parents, Philip is gay and he decides to "come out" to them. His parents are taken aback by the news and his mother, Rose, says that she will need time to come to terms with it. However, the revelation has a far greater impact on his father, Owen, who at first seems accepting of his son's revelation but later begins to cry. Although he has been married to Rose for years, Owen is also secretly gay and makes clandestine visits to gay bars and gay adult cinemas.

Meanwhile, Philip's boyfriend, an American named Elliot, receives a visit from his adoptive parents Derek and Geoffrey, the gay couple who raised him. Soon after their visit, Elliot decides he no longer wants a relationship with Philip and moves to Paris. Philip remains friends with Elliot's female flatmate, Jerene, a PhD student writing her thesis on languages and behaviour. Her research includes the secret language that a pair of young twins created between themselves and also the case of a neglected young child who began emulating the movements of construction cranes as this was the only thing he could see out of his bedroom window and therefore his only interaction with the outside world at a developmental age.

Owen and Philip go out for a meal and Owen asks Philip questions about his sexuality and how people know that they are gay. He says that he is asking because he has a colleague at the university where he works, an attractive man named Winston, and wonders if he is gay. Owen says he will invite Winston for dinner because Philip might like him. However, on the evening of the dinner party, it becomes clear to Rose that Owen is the one who is actually attracted to Winston. She later confronts him which leads to Owen admitting his sexuality to her. Owen goes to stay with Philip and finally tells his son about himself.

== Cast ==
- Brian Cox as Owen
- Angus Macfadyen as Philip
- Eileen Atkins as Rose
- Corey Parker as Elliot
- Richard Warwick as Frank
- Cathy Tyson as Jerene
- René Auberjonois as Geoffrey
- John Schlesinger as Derek
- Ben Daniels as Robin
- Nigel Whitmey as Winston

== Release and censorship ==
The film premiered at the 1991 London Film Festival. It was broadcast on BBC 2 on 9 February 1992. It was shown in the United States on PBS on 24 June 1992 as part of Great Performances, but was selectively edited using alternative takes for its American television airing. According to producer Ruth Caleb, in the American version, there is no frontal nudity, the actors are semi-clothed, and a scene in a pornographic movie theater also was edited for U.S. broadcast.

PBS was coming under fire by conservative groups in the early 1990s for presenting programming showing homosexuality and nudity. A Public Television (PTV) audience analyst predicted that Cranes "in some markets could be a problem". Following an outcry by the Rev. Donald Wildmon and his American Family Association, a number of PBS stations, such as WFYI in Indianapolis, WMFE in Orlando, KEDT in Corpus Christi, and KMBH in Harlingen, Texas, refused to show the film.

When Texaco chose not to renew its underwriting for Great Performances, right before the premiere of the Cranes, it was criticized by Out in Film, an association of LGBT people in the entertainment industry, who said Texaco's decision amounted to "corporate gay-bashing...and blatant homophobia". However, a spokeswoman for Texaco said the company had fulfilled its funding commitment to Great Performances: "Our obligation was to sponsor 26 programs in the series. We actually sponsored 27".

The uncensored version is available on Region 1 DVD in the U.S., and on Region 2 DVD in The Netherlands. Despite not being censored, the DVD version does contain some edits, and omits part of a scene that was shown in the original uncut version in which Jerene (while reading Elliot's letter to Philip) sings a few bars of the Rolling Stones' hit "Miss You". In common with most Screen Two films, it has not been released on home video in the UK.

== Critical reception ==
In his review for the PBS airing, John J. O'Connor wrote that the cast, directed by Nigel Finch, "is quite admirable, from the dominant presences of Angus MacFadyen and Brian Cox to the brief but perfectly attuned appearances of the film director John Schlesinger and Rene Auberjonois as a gay couple visiting from Long Island...some passing sex scenes would be considered fairly standard television arrangements of entwined torsos and heavy kissing except, of course, that these involve same-sex partners. Like most prime-time milestones, this one is sure to trigger applause in some quarters, rage in others. In the long run, one hopes, television will have taken another small step toward growing up".

In a review from the London Lesbian and Gay Film Festival, they point out that David Leavitt's first novel is not the most obvious choice for a film adaptation. But, "it is to their great credit, that Sean Mathias' excellent script and Nigel Finch's adept direction do the novel such great justice". TV critic Ken Tucker said in his review of the PBS airing that the film is an excellent example of "British 'kitchen sink' drama, in which characters trapped in stifling emotional situations discuss, argue, and fight over their problems from every angle". He graded the movie A−, and concluded that the film "unlike many American TV movies, doesn’t idealize its gay characters; they are fully drawn, fallible people...Cranes features first-rate acting by all three of its stars; it goes on a bit too long, and its ending is flat, but it’s a punchy piece of drama nonetheless".
