= The Two Hotel Francforts =

2013 biographical novel by David Leavitt

- First edition (US)
- Author: David Leavitt
- Publisher: Bloomsbury USA
- Publication date: 15 October 2013
- Publication place: United States
- Pages: 272
- ISBN: 978-1596910423
- Preceded by: The Indian Clerk

The Two Hotel Francforts is a fictive biographical novel by David Leavitt, published in 2013. It is Leavitt's eighth novel. The book is set in Lisbon in 1940. It follows two couples who meet by chance while they are staying in one of the city's two Hotel Francforts, awaiting safe passage to America during the first summer of World War II.

== Reception ==
Alex Preston from The Guardian gave a favorable review, concluding the novel "should establish [Leavitt] again as one of the major voices of contemporary fiction. Moving, ravishing and fiercely ambitious, this is a novel to treasure."

Michael Pye from The New York Times stated the decision to use the backdrop of Lisbon in World War II (which was one of the very few neutral, open European Atlantic ports, and a major gateway for refugees to the U.S and for spies), and to use famous figures such as Aristides de Sousa Mendes as background props, was a brave and risky move. Pye noted some historical errors in the book, though praised it for its compelling "love story that could happen anywhere at any time."

Oprah.com stated that the novel "unfurls like a classic Hollywood film, crackling with intrigue and illicit romance. One almost expects Humphrey Bogart and Ingrid Bergman to glide into view." Lambda Literary Review argued that Leavitt's The Two Hotel Francforts is a novel that "stands with his best work" and is "at once very much of its era but also strikingly contemporary."
