= The Golden Child (novel) =

1977 novel by Penelope Fitzgerald

- Cover to first edition
- Author: Penelope Fitzgerald
- Language: English
- Published: 1977
- Publisher: Duckworth
- Publication place: United Kingdom
- Media type: Print
- Pages: 159

The Golden Child is a 1977 mystery novel by the British author Penelope Fitzgerald, her first published work of fiction. Written while her husband was terminally ill, and partly for his benefit, the novel offers a satirical version of the 1972 Treasures of Tutankhamun exhibition at the British Museum, and pokes fun at museum politics, academics, and Cold War spying.

== Plot ==
In London in January 1973 the Museum (unnamed in the novel) is exhibiting for the first time anywhere the golden Garamantian treasures, on loan from the Garamantian government, that had been discovered years earlier by the eminent archaeologist Sir William Simpkin. Sir William, wealthy and now elderly, is retained by the Museum as a figurehead, largely because the Museum’s director, Sir John Allison, expects to receive a large bequest on the old man's death. Huge crowds queue for hours for a brief glimpse under poor lighting of the two most famous exhibits: the Golden Child and the Ball of Golden Twine. Rumours circulate that the Child is cursed.

Sir William shows little interest in the exhibition, but he does ask to take a closer look at one of the many clay tablets that accompany the treasures. Late at night, while returning the tablet to its case at Sir William’s request, a Junior Exhibition Officer, Waring Smith, is attacked and partly strangled, apparently with the Golden Twine.

The German Garamantologist Professor Untermensch tells the Director that all the artefacts in the exhibition are fakes. Sir John decides that a second opinion is needed; this has to be obtained covertly because of the political sensitivities of the Garamantian loan. He dispatches Smith to Moscow, along with one of the lesser treasures, to get the opinion of the Russian Garamantologist Professor Semyonov. The Director expects that no one will be suspicious of Smith because of his lowly position. Untermensch, however, thinks that the Soviets will assume he is a spy, and shadows him. The Soviets do indeed make that assumption and, to show that they know the game the British are playing, they allow Smith and Untermensch into the Kremlin to view the real Garamantian treasures. Smith discovers that there is no such person as Semyonov.

On returning to the UK, a demoralised Smith is detained by a man from the Ministry of Defence who demands to know what his business was in Russia. Trying to explain himself, Smith mentions Sir William, whom he expects will clarify the reasons for his visit, only to learn that Sir William has been found dead, trapped between two sliding steel shelf units in the Museum library. A warder who had been acting as unofficial retainer to Sir William is also found dead, after falling from a fifth-floor window.

A Museum technician reveals that the tablet Smith took back to its case was a fake that he had made himself on Sir William’s instructions. Untermensch decodes its inscription to reveal Sir William’s message: that his bequest to Sir John Allison is revoked. Accused of murder, Sir John pulls a gun and flees. When he realises there is no escape, he shoots himself, crashing down on the exhibits to reveal them for the fakes they are. The staff patch up the exhibits so that they look convincing in the dim light, just in time for the evening opening.

== Principal characters ==
- Sir William Simpkin: elderly archaeologist, discoverer of the Golden Child
- Sir John Allison: Museum Director
- Marcus Hawthorne-Mannering: Keeper of Funerary Art
- Waring Smith: Junior Exhibition Officer
- Professor Heinrich Untermensch: German Garamantologist
- Dr Tite-Live Rochegrosse-Bergson (Schwarz): French cultural anthropologist
- Professor Cyril Ivanovitch Semyonov: supposed Russian Garamantologist
- Jones Jones: Warder, unofficial retainer to Sir William
- Len Coker: Technician, Conservation and Technical Services Department.
- Dousha Vartarian: Secretary to Sir William Simpkin
- Miss Rank: Secretary to Sir John Allison.

== Background ==
Fitzgerald wrote the novel to amuse her husband, who was terminally ill with bowel cancer. She also wanted to deal with the annoyance she had felt when visiting The Treasures of Tutankhamun exhibition at the British Museum in 1972 (having speculated that everything in it was a forgery), and also to write about someone who had been unpleasant to her when she was visiting museums to research her book on Burne-Jones.

Fitzgerald’s original manuscript for the novel, to be called The Golden Opinion, was much longer than the published version. It included chapters on the continuing cover-up of the fraud, as well as scenes in which the Cabinet Secretary discusses the possibility of public disorder sparked by the fake exhibition. The publisher told her that they needed to be cut, along with the entirety of a sub-plot and several additional characters.

Fitzgerald's publisher suggested that she should write more novels featuring Professor Untermensch as a recurring detective. She did indeed start work on two Untermensch thrillers, but in the end thought it best not to be typecast.

== Critical reception ==
H. R. F. Keating, reviewing the book as a crime novel for The Times, referred to the novel’s good joking (if occasionally in-joking), its muted social criticism, and its good writing if somewhat consciously so.

Writing in the Library Journal, Henri C. Veit called the novel "A muddle of violence and intrigue that I wouldn't have missed for the world."

In a 2014 introduction to the Fourth Estate paperback reissue Charles Saumarez Smith called the book "taut, finely plotted [and] richly comic, with some of the elements of exaggerated satire characteristic of a campus novel."

== Bibliography ==
- Lee, Hermione (2013). Penelope Fitzgerald: A Life. London: Chatto & Windus. ISBN 9780701184957.
- Wolfe, Peter (2004). "The Great Museum Sideshow". Understanding Penelope Fitzgerald. University of South Carolina Press.
