= At Freddie's =

1982 novel by Penelope Fitzgerald

- First edition cover
- Author: Penelope Fitzgerald
- Language: English
- Genre: Theatre-fiction
- Published: 1982 (Collins, UK); 1985 (DR Godine, US)
- Publication place: United Kingdom
- Media type: Print
- Pages: 182 (UK) 213 (US)

At Freddie's is a 1982 novel by the British author Penelope Fitzgerald. The last of her novels drawing directly on her personal experiences, it focuses on an august but shabby London stage school for children, The Temple. Fitzgerald had herself been a general studies teacher at the Italia Conti stage school. The school in the novel is known as Freddie's after its elderly principal Freddie Wentworth, a character partly based on that of the impresario Lilian Baylis. The book received mixed reviews on its first UK publication, and on its 1985 appearance in the US.

== Plot ==
The novel is set in Central London, in 1963. The Temple stage school (often known as Freddie’s) has been owned and run on traditional lines by its principal Freddie Wentworth for 40 years. An august but shabby institution, it offers training in Shakespearean and other stage drama to child actors, deliberately eschewing more profitable types of work such as TV, film and modelling. In spite of pressure to modernise from her solicitor brother, and from Joey Blatt, an intending investor, Freddie prefers to beg or borrow anything she needs from the local theatre community, relying on her reputation and charm. She spends as little as she possibly can on staff, engaging just two temporary general studies teachers for the students: Hannah Graves and Pierce Carroll.

Hannah comes from a Catholic Northern Ireland background, and has taken the role as an entree into her much-loved theatre world. Carroll, about ten years older, is from a repressive Protestant background; he has no interest in the theatre, and has taken the post simply because he can get no other. The teachers see a lot of each other during their long working hours, and Caroll becomes attracted to Hannah. Realising his own incompetence at teaching, as in everything else, Carroll's attraction turns into unhealthy infatuation, and after Hannah out of pity offers him sex she finds him assuming that marriage will follow. Hannah, however, has taken up with ‘Boney’ Lewis, an older professional actor who is appearing in a West End production of Shakespeare's King John.

Freddie’s is asked to provide two child actors to play the young Prince Arthur in King John. Mattie Stewart is to take the part at the start of the run, to be followed by Jonathan Kemp. Although a competent actor, Mattie struggles in the role, and his fear of heights makes it particularly difficult for him to be convincing in the scene in which he has to jump from the castle battlements to his death. Jonathan is the more naturally talented actor, and realises that if the scene is to be realistic he will have to practise the jump repeatedly. In the novel's climax, Jonathan is accidentally locked into the school after-hours, and rehearses his jumps alone in the snowy darkness from a high wall that surrounds the school's brick-paved back yard. At the same time, Freddie has gone out to dine for the first time in many years, having decided at last to accept Joey Blatt's offer to invest. She informs him of her intended decision, but when he confides how personally moving he finds Mattie's acting she angrily attacks him for having no taste. The investment remains unresolved. Meanwhile, Jonathan's fate is also left unclear, the novel ending as he continues to climb and jump “again and again and again into the darkness.”

== Principal characters ==
- Frieda (‘Freddie’) Wentworth: aged 73, principal and owner of The Temple stage school in Central London
- Hilary (‘The Bluebell’) Blewett: Freddie's assistant
- Unwin: Freddie's accountant
- Hannah Graves: aged 20, general studies teacher; from a Catholic Northern Ireland family
- Pierce Carroll: aged about 30, general studies teacher; from a Protestant Northern Ireland family
- Matthew (‘Mattie’) Stewart: 11-year-old student
- Jonathan Kemp: 9-year-old student; a naturally gifted actor
- James Wentworth: Freddie's brother, a solicitor
- Joey Blatt: business acquaintance of Mattie's father
- ‘Boney’ Lewis: actor, aged 43
- Ed Voysey: director of King John.

== Background ==
Fitzgerald centred the book on the experiences of her first teaching job, at the Italia Conti stage school in Clapham, London, where she taught general subjects to aspiring child actors. The school was at the time located in a large shabby Edwardian house, with the "academic department" being squeezed into four tiny offices on the top floor. Fitzgerald often went out to theatres with her books to provide backstage tutoring for those children who were in work.

Fitzgerald's biographer Hermione Lee called the character of Freddie "partly just a huge joke, a female Falstaff, a vast, shambolic, sedentary creature frowsting in her smelly, shabby, crimson lair." One of her inspirations was Lilian Baylis, perhaps from Violet May's Tribute to a Lady of 1975.

At Freddie's was the last of Fitzgerald's novels to draw closely on her own personal experiences, before she embarked on her so-called 'historical novels'.

== Critical reception ==
Critical reception was mixed. Writing in The Times, Flora Casement held At Freddie's to be "compelling and enjoyable" due to its original style and satisfactorily unpredictable ending. For The Sunday Times, Nicholas Shrimpton considered the book, when taken as a novel, to be a mere pot-pourri of nostalgic anecdote. But when taken as a historical document he thought it "a wonderful direct statement of the mixture of fascination and loathing with which the British continue to approach their theatre."

Reviewing the first US publication in 1985 for The New York Times Book Review, Roxanna Robinson called the novel "well mannered, well written and instantly forgettable." And in The Washington Post, Anne Tyler said that the book, "like a Hirschfeld caricature, aims solely to delineate, to depict. But it does that admirably well."

Peter Wolfe in 2004 called the book "a novel whose dizzying moral ironies, smart pace, and deft set pieces give it a real grace".

In her 2013 biography, Hermione Lee noted that the Theatre-Land of 1960s London is invoked with brio, with every small character part invoking the time between post-war and modern London. Asked in interviews about the book's conclusion, Fitzgerald stated that she had meant Jonathan to die, or for readers to think that he would do so. Lee notes, however, that the novel does not tell us: comedy hovers on the edge of tragedy, with the balance kept perfectly unresolved.

== Adaptations ==
It was announced in 2015 that David Nicholls had been commissioned to write a stage version for The Old Vic in London, but the play never appeared. In 2016, BBC Radio 4 Extra broadcast a dramatization, with Margaret Tyzack as Freddie.

== Bibliography ==
- Lee, Hermione (2013). Penelope Fitzgerald: A Life. London: Chatto & Windus. ISBN 9780701184957.
- Wolfe, Peter (2004). Understanding Penelope Fitzgerald. Columbia: University of South Carolina Press. ISBN 1-57003-561-X.
