= Human Voices =

1980 novel by Penelope Fitzgerald

- Cover to 1980 first edition
- Author: Penelope Fitzgerald
- Language: English
- Published: 1980
- Publisher: Collins
- Publication place: United Kingdom
- Media type: Print
- Pages: 176

Human Voices is a 1980 novel by the British author Penelope Fitzgerald. It relates the fictionalised experiences of a group of BBC employees at Broadcasting House, London, in 1940 when the city was under nightly attack from the Luftwaffe's high explosive, incendiary, and parachute bombs.

== Plot ==
Seymour ‘Sam’ Brooks is the BBC's Recorded Programme Director (RPD), a technically brilliant though needy man. Self-centred, obsessed with his work, and oblivious to much of what goes on around him, he deals with his colleagues’ lack of understanding and sympathy by surrounding himself with young female Recorded Programme Assistants (RPAs) with whom he shares his complaints and worries. He faces constant fights to maintain his department’s status within Broadcasting House. His manager, the Director of Programme Planning (DPP) Jeff Haggard, helps to protect Sam from the day-to-day annoyances of working for the Corporation.

After one of Sam's new RPAs, Lise Bernard, leaves unexpectedly very soon after being appointed in order to seek her French soldier boyfriend, Jeff and senior management decide that Sam should no longer be permitted to recruit. Without Sam's input they select as his new RPA Annie Asra, the 17-year-old orphaned daughter of a piano tuner from Birmingham. She astonishes Sam the first time they meet when she steadfastly maintains that the singer on one of Sam's cherished recordings is slightly flat. To celebrate the successful completion of his design for a new microphone windshield, Sam takes his RPAs out to dinner at an expensive French restaurant. Annie realises that she has fallen in love with him.

Lise, who has not been seen for months, unexpectedly contacts one of her ex-colleagues and persuades her to provide a ticket allowing her to sleep for a few nights in the BBC's bunk room, intended for employees who are not able to get home after their shift. It transpires that Lise is pregnant, and on arriving at the bunk room she goes into labour. Jeff arranges for Lise to be transferred to a nearby hospital.

Bombs rain down on broadcasting house, and Annie rushes to Sam's office. She acknowledges her love for him, and the two leave the building together to talk at a local cafe. Sam telephones Jeff to ask him to come over immediately, to discuss his intended resignation. Unknown to Sam, Jeff has also decided to resign from the BBC. He hesitates, and then tells Sam that he cannot come. Leaving Broadcasting House in the dark, Jeff mistakes an unexploded parachute bomb resting against the kerb for his taxi. It explodes, and he is killed.

== Principal characters ==
- Seymour "Sam" Brooks, Recorded Programme Director (RPD)
- Jeffrey Haggard, Director of Programme Planning (DPP)
- Annie Asra, Recorded Programmes Assistant (RPA)
- Mrs Milne, secretary to Brooks
- Lise Bernard, RPA
- Violet Simmons, RPA
- Teddy, RPA
- Willie Sharpe, RPA
- John "Mac" McVitie, American news broadcaster.

== Background ==
Fitzgerald worked for the wartime Ministry of Food from June to November 1940, after which she worked as a features producer for the BBC.

== Critical reception ==
Writing in the Library Journal in 1999, Starr E. Smith said that Fitzgerald, drawing on her own youthful employment at the BBC, "brings time, place, and characters to life in a book remarkable for its dexterous and appealing prose".

In his Understanding Penelope Fitzgerald (2004) Peter Wolfe called the book "fluent without wordiness and poetic without being showy", and the author's "ability to make it look easy" a marvel. Wolfe noted that the book delivered what readers had come to expect: “a well-crafted plot with sensitive emotional understanding, prose graced by shining moments, intimacy and immediacy, and engaging people who are trying to sort out their lives in the teeth of disaster”.

Hermione Lee, Fitzgerald's biographer, noted that although the novel at first appears to be a light, funny, brilliantly accurate recreation of the BBC in wartime, there is also danger and anguish, a strong idea about truth, and a sad affectionate remembering of the author's younger self.

In his introduction to the 2014 paperback edition of the novel, Mark Damazer noted that while Fitzgerald may only have been in her mid-20s when she worked for the BBC, she palpably understood its “profound, fussy, and sometimes vain but largely heroic and invaluable commitment to the truth – and expressed it in the form of a concise, witty and beautiful novel".

== Bibliography ==
- Wolfe, Peter (2004). Understanding Penelope Fitzgerald. Columbia: University of South Carolina Press. ISBN 1-57003-561-X.
- Lee, Hermione (2013). Penelope Fitzgerald: A Life. London: Chatto & Windus. ISBN 9780701184957.
- Damazer, Mark (2013). "Introduction". Human Voices (2014 paperback ed.). Fourth Estate.
