= The Body of Jonah Boyd =

2004 novel by David Leavitt

- Cover of UK edition
- Author: David Leavitt
- Language: English
- Genre: Psychological fiction, Domestic fiction
- Published: 2004
- Publication place: United States
- Media type: Print
- Pages: 215 pgs
- ISBN: 9781582341880
- OCLC: 53097216

The Body of Jonah Boyd is a novel by David Leavitt, published in 2004, that depicts various consequences of the theft of a manuscript. It tells a story about the life of a common American family dealing with ethical principles, relationships and fairness (and unfairness) today. The story is perceived through the eyes of Denny, the secretary and mistress of university professor Ernest Wright, who increasingly exerts influence on the life of the Wright family.

While the novel is set in the fictional town (and university) of Wellspring, Leavitt dedicates the book to the Stanford, California, house he grew up in, 743 Cooksey Lane. This house subsequently became notorious as the site of Sam Bankman-Fried's house arrest.

== Plot introduction ==
The crucial starting point of all following events is the Wrights’ annual Thanksgiving dinner in 1969, when author Jonah Boyd, the new husband of Mrs. Wright's friend Anne, accidentally loses his notebooks including his almost finished novel.

== Plot summary ==
Anne finds the manuscript and schemes against Boyd in order to teach him a lesson for his carelessness. She asks Ben Wright, the youngest son and amateur poet who was also present when Anne found the books again, to hide the novel until she would tell him to "surprisingly find" it. Jonah stops writing and changes his careless behaviour towards Anne. Since Anne very appreciates her kind of "new" husband and does not want him to get into his former rut again, she decides to leave the book in Ben's care instead of returning it to her husband. Jonah, who used to drink, again finds consolation in alcohol, which ultimately leads to his death through a car accident.

Years later, when almost nobody who knows about Boyd's novel is still alive, Ben finishes the book and publishes it under his name. Critics review Ben's ending as the best part of the novel. This way, Ben develops his own writing style and becomes a successful novelist.

When Denny finally discovers this "theft", she decides to confront Ben. Surprisingly he sees this situation as a possibility to confide with someone rather than a threat.

At last they marry and after Ben's death Denny even inherits the Wrights’ house, which plays a central part in the family's and Denny's lives and in which all the fatal events took their start.

== Characters ==
Judith "Denny" Denham: Ernest Wrights' secretary and Nancy Wrights' four-hand partner at playing the piano – secretly wants to be part of the Wright family. Although she describes herself as being "fat" and not at all beautiful, she never has any problems attracting men and has already had several affairs with married men. So, too, with Ernest Wright. Nevertheless, she comes over every Saturday to play the piano with Nancy, but in fact, she wants more. Despite Denny always claims that she does not want to marry as it is sufficient for her to have affairs with various married men, she collects every issue of "Modern Bride". In the end, everything turns out well for Denny. She marries Ben Wright and therefore becomes part of the Wright family and even inherits the Wrights' house – which she has secretly longed for. Her inner wish to become a part of the Wright family, is quite understandable since she has never had a chance to experience a real family life: her father ran away and her mother died. This circumstance also explains why she so readily accepts Nancy's way of treating her, which is more like that of a mother than a friend.

Ernest Wright: He is married to Nancy Wright and the father of Mark, Daphne and Ben. Besides, he is a professor at the psych department, which focuses on Freudian psychology, at the university of Wellspring. Irrespective of his role as husband and father, he is having a secret affair with his secretary Judith "Denny" Denham. Phil Perry and Glenn Turner, Ernest's protégés, take also part in the story.

Nancy Wright: She is Ernest's wife. Although she knows about her husband's affair with Denny she pretends to be unsuspecting. At first, it seems that Nancy and Denny might become friends because Ernest's secretary is invited to the Wrights' place every weekend as Nancy's four-hand partner at playing the piano. But since the preparations for a Thanksgiving dinner in 1969, she starts to treat Denny more like a servant than a friend. Their relationship is described as fractious and sometimes maudlin. In fact, Nancy uses Denny as a kind of substitute for her friend Anne. She actually does not look for a real friend, but someone whom she can "cultivate and nurture", as if Denny like Daphne was Nancy's daughter and not equal in age.

Ben Wright: At first sight, the 15-year-old amateur poet seems to be a minor character of the novel. But as the story develops the reader is granted a greater insight into Ben. For many years he has had a secret crush on Anne, an old friend of the family and Jonah Boyd's wife. Anne takes advantage of the situation and intrigues with Ben to steal Boyd's notebooks in order to teach her husband a lesson. 15-year-old Ben is confused by her behaviour, but accepts Anne's conditions. Decades later he publishes the stolen novel under his own name and becomes a famous writer. When Denny finds out about the theft, she conceals the truth and marries Ben.

Daphne Wright: The 17-year-old daughter of the Wrights' family, she experiences her first love affair with her father's protégé, Glenn Turner, which has to be kept secret.

Mark Wright: He is the 20-year-old son of Mr. and Mrs. Wright. In 1969 he went to Canada in order to avoid his military draft. Because of his physical absence the narration does not focus on Mark and he is only a minor character of the story.

Anne Boyd: In 1969 Anne, who is Nancy's former four-hand partner at playing the piano, has married the celebrated author Jonah Boyd. Her frustration with her unfulfilled love-life with Jonah Boyd triggers her decision to intrigue against him. Secretly, she has a pedophilic relationship with Ben during his adolescence.

Jonah Boyd: He is a celebrated author and a special guest at the Wrights' Thanksgiving dinner in 1969 where he "loses" his notebooks with his almost finished novel. Towards the end of the story, Jonah Boyd, being a former drinker, dies in a car accident. The "accident" is in fact suicide. Although the conspiracy of Ben and Anne is the reason for Boyd's death, neither the boy nor Anne feel guilty. Ben avails himself of the opportunity and publishes Boyd's novel under his name. Anne coldly informs the readership that she does acknowledge her crime, however, she does not want to spend the rest of her life doing penance for it. She adds: "What good could come of that? Two lives ruined, instead of just one."

== Discussion ==
The ambiguous title sets the reader on a wrong track until it is fully explained at the end of the story. Judging from the title The Body of Jonah Boyd the reader might assume that this novel is about the death of Jonah Boyd. However, the word 'body' refers to the written body of Jonah Boyd (his unfinished manuscript), rather than to his corpse.

With the episode of the theft of Boyd's manuscript, Leavitt wants to defend himself once again and claim his honesty against Spender's charges, who accused him, arguing that While England Sleeps, Leavitt's novel about literary London in the 1930s, used substantial inattributed material from Spender's autobiography "World Within World".

Normally being a feature of most crime stories, this novel withholds important information for a long time to build up suspense. It is also striking that only at the end of the novel the real narrator is revealed. Although one is tricked into believing that the story has been written by Denny, it turns out that the writer of the story is Ben (Ben tells the story as if Denny narrated it).
