= The Bookshop =

1978 novel by Penelope Fitzgerald

- First edition
- Author: Penelope Fitzgerald
- Language: English
- Publisher: Gerald Duckworth
- Publication date: 1978
- Publication place: United Kingdom
- Media type: Print
- Pages: 118
- ISBN: 0-395-86946-3
- OCLC: 37155604
- Dewey Decimal: 823/.914 21
- LC Class: PR6056.I86 B66 1997

The Bookshop is a 1978 novel by the British author Penelope Fitzgerald. It was shortlisted for the Booker Prize. The novel was made into a film by Isabel Coixet in 2017.

== Plot ==
The novel, set mainly in 1959, follows Florence Green, a middle-aged widow, who decides to open a bookshop in the small coastal town of Hardborough, Suffolk (a thinly-disguised version of Southwold). The location she chooses is the Old House, an abandoned, damp property said to be haunted by a "rapper" (poltergeist). After many sacrifices, Florence manages to start her business, which grows for about a year, after which sales slump. She is opposed by the influential and ambitious Mrs Gamart, who wants to acquire the Old House to set up an arts centre. Mrs Gamart's nephew, a member of parliament, sponsors a bill that empowers local councils to buy any historic building that has been left uninhabited for five years. The bill is passed, the Old House is compulsorily purchased, and Florence is evicted.

== Critical reception ==
As a novel by a still relatively unknown writer, The Bookshop appeared to mostly condescending initial reviews. The Times called it "a harmless, conventional little anecdote, well-tailored but uninvolving"; The Guardian a "disquieting" novel about "really nasty people living in a really nice little coastal town"; and The Times Literary Supplement, while calling it "marvellously piercing", pigeonholed it as an example of "the Beryl Bainbridge school of anguished women's fiction". Auberon Waugh in the Evening Standard publicly advised her to write longer books. But a few critics did understand her immediately: Richard Mayne on BBC Radio 3's Critics Forum praised the "wonderful precision, economy and certainty" of the writer".

The book was shortlisted for the 1978 Booker Prize: a surprise given the tone of some of the initial reviews.

"The Bookshop catches Fitzgerald coming into top form" said Peter Wolfe in Understanding Penelope Fitzgerald (2004). Wolfe held the book to be a fully realized work of fiction that confirms the author's hold on actuality and the cogency of her satire. In an introduction to a 2010 reprint, Frank Kermode wrote that the novel had won Fitzgerald "the respectful attention of reviewers and the admiration of a larger public". Hermione Lee, Fitzgerald's biographer, considered the novel to be "a joyous exercise in precise, eloquent detail"; a novel that "uses its small-scale comic plot for a serious moral argument".

Writing for The Guardian in 2023, Anthony Cummins noted that the book's early patronising reviews "missed Fitzgerald’s precise gift for dramatising complex moral questions in the most quaintly innocuous of settings." He considered the book to mark the first full expression of the author's perfectly poised satirical voice; a memorable tragicomedy of stifling small-town English cruelties.

== Film adaptation ==
In 2017 the novel was adapted by Isabel Coixet into a film of the same name, with Emily Mortimer as Florence Green, Patricia Clarkson as Violet Gamart, and Bill Nighy as Edmund Brundish.

== Bibliography ==
- Lee, Hermione (2013). Penelope Fitzgerald: A Life. London: Chatto & Windus. ISBN 9780701184957.
- Wolfe, Peter (2004). Understanding Penelope Fitzgerald. Columbia: University of South Carolina Press. ISBN 1-57003-561-X.
