= Julian Wastall =

British composer

Julian Wastall (18 September 1958 – 11 January 1994) was a composer working in film and TV including the successful Granada TV series Cracker (1993) and The Lost Language of Cranes (1991). Other credits include Clubland (1991), GamesMaster (1992), Revolver (1991) and Angels (1992).

As 'Jules Wastall' he is credited with the theme music for Channel 4's gay and lesbian magazine show Out On Tuesday which launched in 1989.

He won a British Academy Cymru Award in 1992 for Best Original Music with Daemion Barry for Friday On My Mind.

The classical music composer Rachel Portman's work, ‘For Julian,’ was a memorial in solo piano for her friend.
