= Valpy FitzGerald =

British economist

- Born: 30 January 1947 (age 79)
- Organization: University of Oxford
- Known for: Development economics
- Children: 3
- Website: www.qeh.ox.ac.uk/people/valpy-fitzgerald

Valpy Fitzgerald (aka E. V. K. Fitzgerald) is a British development economist and emeritus professor of International Development Finance at the Oxford Department of International Development. His research focus has been on international finance and taxation, income inequality, Kaleckian macroeconomics, and Latin America. He is the son of the noted author Penelope Fitzgerald (née Knox) and soldier Desmond Fitzgerald and the grandson of the former editor of Punch Edmund George Valpy Knox. His sister is notable British neuroscientist Maria Fitzgerald.

== Academic service and awards ==
- Managing editor of the Journal of Development Studies in the 1980s
- Queen Victoria Eugenia chair at the Universidad Complutense (Madrid) 1995-6 and 1996-7
- Honorary Doctorate awarded by Complutense University (Dec 2014)

== Selected publications ==
- FitzGerald, V. (2006). Financial development and economic growth: a critical view. Background Paper for World Economic and Social Survey.
- Fitzgerald, V. (1999). The economics of liberation theology. The Cambridge companion to liberation theology, 218–234.
- Fitzgerald, V. (2005). Economic doctrines in Latin America: origins, embedding and evolution. R. Thorp (Ed.). Palgrave Macmillan.
- Fitzgerald, V. (2002). Social Institutions and Economic Development. Kluwer..
- Stewart, F., & Fitzgerald, E. V. K. (2001). War and underdevelopment (Vol. 2). OUP Oxford.
- FitzGerald, V. (2006). Models of saving, income and the macroeconomics of developing countries in the Post-Keynesian tradition. Growth and Economic Development: Essays in Honour of AP Thirlwall, 247–264.
- FitzGerald, E. V. K. (1978). Public sector investment planning for developing countries. London: Macmillan
- FitzGerald, E. V. K. (1988). Kalecki on planned growth in the mixed economy. Development and Change, 19, 33–52.
- FitzGerald, E.V.K. 1989. (editor with C. M. Cooper). Development studies revisited: Twenty five years of the Journal of Development Studies, London, Frank Cass.
- FitzGerald, E. V. K. (1990). Kalecki on the financing of development: An approach to the macroeconomics of the semi-industrialized economy. Cambridge Journal of Economics, 14, 183–203.
- FitzGerald, E. V. K. (1993). The macroeconomics of development finance: A Kaleckian analysis of the semi-industrialized economy. London: Macmillan.10.1007/978-1-349-22475-3
