= Journal of Development Studies =

- Discipline: Development studies
- Language: English
- Edited by: Jennifer Brass, Ronelle Burger, David Fielding, Oliver Morrissey, Richard Palmer-Jones, Emmanuel Teitelbaum -

Publication details
- History: 1964–present
- Publisher: Routledge
- Frequency: Quarterly 1964-1994, currently 12 issues per year

Standard abbreviations
- ISO 4: J. Dev. Stud.

Indexing
- ISSN: 0022-0388 (print); 1743-9140 (web)

Links
- Journal homepage

Journal of Development Studies is a peer-reviewed academic journal. The journal was established in 1964 and covers research in development policy, theory and analysis. The journal includes both interdisciplinary and single disciplinary but generally accessible contributions from economists, political scientists, geographers, sociologist and social anthropologists). The founding board of editors were Edith Penrose, Alec Nove and Kurt Martin. And other managing editors have included Christopher Colclough, E. V. K. FitzGerald and John Harriss.
