= Equal Affections =

1989 novel by David Leavitt

- Author: David Leavitt
- Language: English
- Genre: Novel
- Publication date: 1989
- Publication place: United States
- Media type: Print (Hardback)

Equal Affections is a 1989 novel by David Leavitt.

== Plot summary ==
Louise, an aging woman, is coming down with cancer. Her husband Nat is having an affair with another woman. Meanwhile, Walter, partner of Louise and Nat's son Danny, has cyber sex and phone sex with other men. April, Danny's sister, visits her brother in suburban New Jersey. With their mother's death looming, they all fly to California where their parents live. To avoid a funeral, Nat throws a lukewarm farewell party. April ends up fighting with her father over his cheating on her mother. Two months later, Nat is publicly seeing his mistress. Danny and Walter invite April and Nat to stay with them at a rented cottage on Long Island. The final part is a prolepsis to Louise's conversion at Catholicism although she is a Jew.

== Characters ==
- Louise Gold
- Nat Cooper, Louise's husband.
- Xavier, one of Louise's first lovers; a fortyish sailor.
- Tommy Burns, one of Louise's first lovers; a WASPish young man.
- April, Louise and Nat's lesbian feminist daughter.
- Joey Conway, one of April's ex-boyfriends.
- Karl Mathias, one of April's ex-boyfriends.
- Tina Tompkins, April's manager.
- Mary McLaughlin, a lesbian singer who works with April at one point.
- Danny, Louise and Nat's gay son.
- Walter, Danny's partner.
- Eleanor, Louise's sister.
- Cousin Joanne
- Jaime Delgado, a burnt patient. His mother is called Dorell, his father Jesus.
