= The Lost Language of Cranes =

1986 novel by David Leavitt

- The Lost Language of Cranes; 1990s reprint book cover
- Author: David Leavitt
- Language: English
- Publisher: Knopf
- Publication date: 26 September 1986 (1st edition)
- Media type: Print

The Lost Language of Cranes is a novel by David Leavitt, first published on September 26, 1986. A British TV film of the novel was made in 1991. The film was released on DVD in 2009.

== Plot introduction ==
The Lost Language of Cranes was the second novel by David Leavitt and deals primarily with the difficulties a young gay man, Philip Benjamin, faces in coming out to his parents, Rose and Owen, and with their subsequent reactions.

== Plot summary ==
=== Voyages ===
Rose and Owen find out that their apartment block is to become a co-op. Rose visits her son, who lives in a shabby neighborhood; he says he likes to go to the East Village. One Sunday she takes a walk, goes to an automat and bumps into her husband. Owen then goes to a gay pornographic cinema, where a man leaves him his number.

Philip and Eliot are in bed; Philip gets up to do the dishes. He thinks back to how they met through Sally. Back to the parents, Owen gets back to his apartment, soaked through. Philip and Eliot then wake up; Philip seems keen on flatmate Jerene's research on lost languages. There is then an account of Jerene's childhood up to her coming out to her parents and being spurned by them. Philip and Eliot then talk about their experiences with men. Philip goes on to remember the way he would masturbate a lot and how he tried to ask girls out - and they refused. Finally, he recalls going to a gay pornographic cinema when he was seventeen.

=== Myths of origin ===
Owen calls Alex Melchor and finds out it was a wrong number. Philip asks Eliot to introduce him to Derek and Geoffrey. Later, he goes to his parents' flat to look at Derek's books. Jerene is getting ready for a date. Philip meets Eliot's foster parents for dinner, then they go to a gay bar where Philip meets his old acquaintance Alex Kamarov. Outside, Eliot admits to being unsure about their relationship; nevertheless they return to Eliot's, where he teaches Philip how to shave properly.

Philip eventually comes out to his parents. His mother is tersely averse; his father says it is fine, though he starts weeping as soon as the young man has left.

=== The crane-child ===
In the library, Jerene reads an article about a child who emulates cranes as this was the only thing he would see out of his window from his cot, and his parents weren't about. He was then sent to a psych ward.

=== Father and Son ===
Eliot doesn't return Philip's calls; when Jerene meets Philip for a drink, she admits there is not much that can be done. Later, Philip talks to his friend Brad. He then gets really drunk out on the town to forget. A few days later, he meets Rob in a bar and they return to the boy's dorm room where they have sex. Subsequently, Philip does not return his calls.

Owen calls a gay hotline, then hangs up and calls Alex Melchor, who tells him to call someone else, and then Philip, hanging up before they can talk. Later, Philip runs into his parents and tells them he's broken up with Eliot.

Rose says to Philip that she needs more time to ruminate. Owen calls a gay sex phone-line and starts sobbing. He then goes to a gay bar and meets another man named Frank; they go to Frank's flat and have sex. When he gets home, it's half past two in the morning, and Rose is hurt.

Owen invites Winston Penn to dinner, and attempts to fix him up with Philip. That night, Rose finally realizes that Owen is gay too. While Philip and Brad get into bed together, Rose and Owen have a big argument. Owen goes off to a Burger King until he calls his son asking for a place to stay for the night. Before Philip goes to find his father, he passionately kisses Brad. Upon Philip's arrival Owen confesses to being gay, and they settle in for a sleepless night in Philip's disorderly apartment.

== Characters ==
- Rose Benjamin, a copy editor. She likes order and cooking. She reads the New York Times and uncritically believes their stories regarding AIDS. She also likes to do crosswords and acrostics.
- Owen Benjamin, a teacher. He is said to be quiet. He lives on Second Avenue with his wife Rose.
- Philip Benjamin, Rose and Owen's son. He is twenty-five years old and lives on the West Side. He works in publishing as does his mother. His voice is once compared to that of Greta Garbo. He is gay, likes to go out in the East Village and lives on his own.
- Mrs Lubin, a widow who lives in the same building as Rose and Owen.
- Arnold Selensky, a friend of Owen's. He runs a video rental business.
- Carole Schneebaum, a co-worker of Rose's.
- Bob Haber, a man Owen meets at a gay pornographic cinema. He confuses him with Alex Melchor.
- Eliot Abrams, Philip's boyfriend, who does freelance work. He then breaks up with Philip and goes to live in Paris, where he moves in with a depressed young man, Thierry.
- Brad, Philip's old friend from Columbia University. After Eliot breaks up with Philip, Brad became Philip's closer friend and later on Philip's new boyfriend.
- Derek Moulthorp, a gay man writing children's books. He brought up Eliot with his partner.
- Geoffrey Bacon, Derek's partner, who brought up Eliot with Derek.
- Sally, a friend of Philip's. She is a tax analyst.
- Jerene, Eliot's black roommate. An early riser and a workaholic. She works in a library and does research on lost languages. She grew up in Westport and was adopted by foster parents.
- Mr Samuel J. Parks, Jerene's father. He is a lawyer.
- Laura Finley, Jerene's new girlfriend. She likes to cook.
- Margaret, Jerene's mother.
- Jessica, Jerene's girlfriend at high school.
- Cornelia Patterson, a black lesbian Jerene looked up to for inspiration while in college.
- Timmy Musseo, Eliot's first boyfriend, at age eleven.
- Ben Hartley, Eliot's first real lover, at age seventeen.
- Dmitri Kamarov, Philip's first lover. He later went to MIT.
- Alex Kamarov, Dmitri's brother, gay too.
- Gerard, Philip's straight childhood friend.
- Maxon, the head of the English department at a college in New York City, who dislikes Owen's marxist psychoanalytic stance.
- Karl Mutter, an American archaeologist, in Rome.
- Rhea Mutter, Karl's wife, like him an archaeologist, though specialized in Mexico and without a fellowship.
- Mira, Karl and Rhea's daughter.
- Brad Robinson, a friend of Sally's and Philip's from college, with whom he eventually sleeps.
- Rob, a young man from Columbia University, whom Philip sleeps with after his break-up with Eliot.
- Roger Bell, a co-worker of Rose's.
- Penelope, a co-worker of Rose's. Her seventeen-year-old son is gay, and she is questioning her own sexual identity.
- Darryl, Penelope's husband, whom she left after she found him in bed with three Indonesian prostitutes.
- Nick, a co-worker of Rose's, with whom she had a five-year affair seven years ago.
- Nadia, Nick's wife.
- Winston Penn, a co-worker of Owen's. Owen thinks he is gay. He lives in Hoboken. He likes to listen to Bruce Springsteen. Although he is fine with Philip's homosexuality, he has a girlfriend, though she lives in Dallas. He is also very aggressive with other drivers and likes to drive fast.
- Stan, co-worker of Owen's, who is openly gay. Winston likes him, thus niggling Owen.
- Frank, a man Owen meets in a gay bar. He is older and married like Owen, and the latter intends to see him again, as he confesses to his son in the last few pages.
- Nellie, Jerene's grandmother. She lives in an old people's home and watching soap operas is her day's highlight.

== References to other works ==
- Rose and Owen's neighborhood is compared to I Love Lucy. Later skyscrapers make Rose think of The Twilight Zone.
- Owen is said to be reading a biography by Lytton Strachey.
- Arnold Selensky listens to Eurythmics and spurns Lawrence Welk.
- Mice on the streets make Philip think of the book Mrs. Frisby and the Rats of NIMH.
- The song "Like a Virgin" by Madonna is being played in the club in Chelsea where Philip and Eliot go on the day they meet.
- The film The Exorcist is playing at a bar where Philip and Eliot also go on their first night together.
- Edward Lear's poem "The Jumblies" is quoted.
- Jerene is said to like to watch The Facts of Life.
- Owen wrote a thesis on Edmund Spenser. Later there is a book of Milton's poems on Winston's car's backseat.
- Rose likes to listen to Billie Holiday. Later, she sings, "Do You Know What It Means to Miss New Orleans".
- Jimi Hendrix and Menudo are mentioned.
- Rose is said to be reading Middlemarch by George Eliot.
- Rose is said to be watching The Rockford Files.
- Alex Melchor listens to Vivaldi's The Four Seasons and refers to Tango Argentino and Stephen Sondheim.
- Other references made are to Tintin, Oscar Wilde, Allen Ginsberg, Philip Glass and The Roches.
- Through doing crosswords, Rose comes across Thomas Mann, Timon of Athens and Lévi-Strauss's Tristes Tropiques.
- When he was younger, Philip would listen to The Carpenters and The Partridge Family.
- Winston compares Rose to Gene Tierney and admits he likes her films.
- Philip and Winston compare the Benjamins to Tennessee Williams's The Glass Menagerie.
- Brad watches Star Trek. He then compares Philip's description of Winston to Zeno's paradoxes.

== References to real life and actual history ==
- Skyscrapers make Rose think of John Glenn.
- Jerene's father was a supporter of Richard Nixon during the 1968 election.
- Billie Jean King is mentioned through Rose having read about her lesbianism in a newspaper.
- Colleen Dewhurst would read to Eliot when he was a child.
- The Watergate trials are mentioned in passing, about the way the 'Watergate conspirators had wept at their trials', after Owen hears Philip's coming-out story.

== Main themes ==
- Homosexuality
- Coming out : Philip comes out to his parents; Jerene came out to her parents and was disowned; Owen eventually comes out to his wife and his son.
- Gay father : Owen explains his unquestionable sense of filial love, but admits he grew up at a time when homosexuality was regarded as a disease and feared his son would spurn him if he found out he was gay.
- Homophobia : Rose spurns both her son and her husband after she finds out they are gay.

== Critical reception ==
It has been said that 'the novel sums up the history of gay books themselves': that is, from the pangs of opprobrium (Owen) to self-acceptance (Philip).
