= The Gate of Angels =

1990 novel by Penelope Fitzgerald

- Cover of first edition
- Author: Penelope Fitzgerald
- Language: English
- Published: 1990
- Publisher: Collins
- Publication place: United Kingdom
- Media type: Print
- Pages: 167

The Gate of Angels is a 1990 historical novel by the British author Penelope Fitzgerald. It is set in 1912 at St Angelicus, a fictional Cambridge University college. The novel was shortlisted for the Booker Prize.

== Plot ==
Fred Fairly, a Junior Fellow of St Angelicus ('Angels'), a (fictional) Cambridge college, is a physicist whose research focuses on the exciting modern field of quantum theory. As Fred cycles along the Guestingley Road in the dark, an unlit farmer's cart pulls out of a gateway into his path, causing him to crash into a stranger - a young woman by the name of Daisy Saunders. Both are knocked unconscious, and are taken in by the wife of Professor Wrayburn who lives nearby. Noting that the young woman wears a wedding ring, she incorrectly assumes that the pair are husband and wife and she puts them into the same bed to recover. On coming round, Fred immediately falls in love with Daisy, but she leaves without giving an address and he has no way of locating her.

Daisy is in fact an impoverished young woman from South London, who has been working towards a nursing position at Blackfriars Hospital. She is single but wears a wedding ring to fend off unwanted male attention. At the time of the accident, she was cycling with Thomas Kelly, a seedy journalist, who quickly made himself scarce.

While Fred is recuperating in a nursing home, Daisy returns to Cambridge and gets a job at the local asylum. She visits Mrs Wrayburn, quickly realises that the household chores are a burden to her, and offers to take them over in return for lodging. As soon as Fred learns of her return, he proposes marriage. Daisy says that she will consider it.

The driver of the farmer's cart that caused the accident has not been found and this draws the interest of Dr Matthews, Provost of St James and teller of ghost stories. It also draws the attention of the local police who open an investigation. In the ensuing trial, Fred, Daisy and Mrs Wrayburn are called as witnesses. While Daisy is in the witness box, the police unexpectedly introduce Thomas Kelly, whom she denies knowing. But Kelly, determined to cause Daisy damage, testifies that he was waiting for her to come to him at a local hotel where rooms are rented out by the hour. Fred is horrified. He leaves the courtroom and waits in a nearby cafe for three hours until Kelly emerges. When he does, Fred knocks him unconscious.

Following the trial, Daisy loses her job. She responds indignantly to Fred's questioning and their relationship appears to be at an end. Daisy says goodbye to Mrs Wrayburn and with no job and no money walks the several miles back to the station for a train to London. After losing her way, she finds herself outside a side gate of Fred's college, St Angelicus, which mysteriously stands open for only the third time in the college's long history. She hears a cry, goes in and helps the blind master of the college who has fainted. The incident has taken only five minutes - a delay just long enough for her to run into Fred, who is returning from a physics lecture.

== Principal characters ==
- Frederick Aylmer "Fred" Fairly: 25-year-old lecturer in practical physics and junior fellow at St Angelicus
- Daisy Saunders: penniless nursing student
- Thomas Kelly: disreputable journalist
- Dr Matthews: Provost of St James, medievalist, paleographer, teller of ghost stories
- Professor Henry Flowerdew: Fred's mentor, a strict Machian
- George Turner: farmer, owner of the cart that collided with Fred and Daisy
- Herbert and Venetia Wrayburn: residents of Cambridge
- James Elder: an attempted suicide
- Dr Sage: a quack.

== Background ==
Fitzgerald's inspiration for the opening of the novel came when she saw through a Cambridge bus window some cows in ecstasy over willow branches that had been broken off by strong winds; she viewed this as an instance of reason giving way to imagination in 'this orderly University city'.

Fitzgerald was familiar with the Cambridge of the 1910s, having researched it for The Knox Brothers (1977), a history of her Knox relatives. Her uncle, Dillwyn Knox had been a classical scholar there, not a physicist, but like the Fred of the book had had a passionate attention to proofs and exact detail; he also like Fred had as a young man suffered a loss of faith that he had tried to shield from his father.

Dillwyn Knox had been a student and Fellow at King's, whose Provost at the time, M. R. James, was - like the Dr Matthews of the novel - a medievalist, palaeographer and author of ghost stories. Fitzgerald explained that "I set my novel in the Cambridge of 1912 because that was the height of the so-called 'mind/body controversy' with the scientists of the Cavendish in controversy with professing Christians, championed by James ... The ghost story is there to give atmosphere to the anti-materialists of Cambridge, who don't believe that physics can explain everything."

The central event of the book, the bicycle crash of mutual strangers who wake up after the accident in the same bed, is based on an incident reported by Burne-Jones.

Fitzgerald has stated that The Gate of Angels is her only novel with a happy ending.

== Critical reception ==
Contemporary reviews of the novel were long and enthusiastic, with John Bailey speaking of her 'mesmeric insouciance' and Sebastian Faulks likening it to being taken in a ride in a peculiar kind of car where everything works beautifully but, halfway through and with exhilarating results, "someone throws the steering wheel out of the window".

Louis B. Jones for The New York Times Book Review noted that "In this novel, atoms and spooks have equal epistemological status".

In his Understanding Penelope Fitzgerald (2004), Peter Wolfe noted that the book explores the Victorian themes of good, evil and responsibility. Fitzgerald being "[t]oo accomplished to go heavy on the signals", the book's strength lies in what is withheld and implied. And, its "irony and deadpan wit impart a quiet intensity that make other novels look soggy and loose".

Writing in 2010, Frank Kermode praised the work for its wealth of period detail, and opined that "The density of implication provided by this short novel is remarkable ... one senses a developed interest in the mysteriousness of the story, the exploitation of a new skill, which is to arrange for the story to project another story, less definite, more puzzling, than the first-hand narrative itself".

Fitzgerald's biographer, Hermione Lee, noted that the novel masquerades as a light, comical love story set in Edwardian times, while also raising - but deliberately not answering - questions about the nature of belief, relativity and truth. Lee held the book to be the most feminist of all of Fitzgerald's novels (though noting that the author did not use that categorisation), dealing as it does with themes of women's struggles, the abuses against them, and their need for solidarity.

The novel was shortlisted for the Irish Times/Aer Lingus Prize and for the Booker Prize.

== Bibliography ==
- Lee, Hermione (2013). Penelope Fitzgerald: A Life. London: Chatto & Windus. ISBN 9780701184957.
- Wolfe, Peter (2004). Understanding Penelope Fitzgerald. Columbia: University of South Carolina Press. ISBN 1-57003-561-X.
