= The Indian Clerk =

2007 novel by David Leavitt

- Author: David Leavitt
- Genre: Fictive biography, Historical fiction
- Publisher: Bloomsbury USA
- Publication date: September 2008
- Publication place: United States
- Pages: 485
- ISBN: 1596910410

The Indian Clerk is a biographical novel by David Leavitt, published in 2007. It is loosely based on the famous partnership between the Indian mathematician, Srinivasa Ramanujan, and his British mentor, the mathematician, G.H. Hardy. The novel was shortlisted for the 2009 International Dublin Literary Award.

== Summary ==
The novel is inspired by the career of the self-taught mathematical genius Srinivasa Ramanujan, as seen mainly through the eyes of his mentor and collaborator G.H. Hardy, a British mathematics professor at Cambridge University. The novel is framed through a series of here largely fictionalized lectures that Hardy gave on the subject of Ramanujan's life and mathematics at New Lecture School at Harvard in the summer of 1936 and the narrative switches between Hardy's recollections and the events of the 1910s when Ramanujan was in England. The framed narrative begins in January 1913, in Cambridge, England, where Hardy receives a letter filled with unorthodox but imaginative mathematics and asking for support and guidance.

== Setting ==
The novel is set against the backdrop of the First World War and colonial India. It features such prominent writers and public figures as D. H. Lawrence, Ludwig Wittgenstein and Bertrand Russell.

== See also ==
- A Disappearing Number (2007) by Complicité, directed by Simon McBurney.
- The Man Who Knew Infinity (1991) by Robert Kanigel
