= The Beginning of Spring =

1988 novel by Penelope Fitzgerald

- First edition cover
- Author: Penelope Fitzgerald
- Language: English
- Set in: Russia
- Published: 1988
- Publisher: Collins
- Publication place: UK
- Media type: Print
- Pages: 224

The Beginning of Spring is a 1988 novel by the British author Penelope Fitzgerald. Set in Moscow in 1913, it tells the story of a Moscow-born English-educated print shop owner whose English wife has suddenly abandoned him and their three children. The novel was shortlisted for the 1988 Booker Prize.

== Plot ==
In March 1913, Nellie Reid leaves her husband Frank, a Russian-born Englishman who runs a printing shop in Moscow. She returns to England without warning or explanation and he urgently needs to find someone to look after his three children, Dolly, Ben and Annie (Annushka).

The Kuriatins, the family of a business partner, prove unsuitable: Frank's visit to them ends in disaster when a bear cub given as a birthday present to the son of the family becomes drunk, wreaks havoc in the dining room, and has to be shot. Then, Mrs Graham, wife of the Anglican chaplain, introduces him to Muriel Kinsman, an English governess who has for reasons that are unclear recently been dismissed from her post. He considers her equally unsuitable.

Frank's chief accountant Selwyn Crane is an idealistic follower of Tolstoy who spends much of his spare time seeking out those he considers to be oppressed; he is also a poet and author of Birch Tree Thoughts. Selwyn introduces Frank to Lisa Ivanovna, a young shop-girl found weeping at the men's handkerchief department of the local store. She is said to be the daughter of a country joiner. Frank employs her, and finds himself attracted by her beauty and serene presence. The children quickly become attached to her.

One night, Frank is called out to his printing works after hours where he surprises a student, Volodya Vasilych, who fires two shots. The intruder says he is there to print revolutionary pamphlets, but later confesses his true motivation: he is jealous of Frank, whom he suspects of courting Lisa. Lisa says that she does not know the student well but that he was one of those who used to hang about the men's handkerchief department.

Frank has been writing regularly to Nellie in England, but has received no reply and is unsure if his letters are reaching her. When her brother Charlie, who lives in Norbury, arrives in Moscow for a visit, Frank hopes for news, but Charlie does not know where Nellie is living. During his stay, Charlie becomes attracted to Lisa and suggests that he should take her and the children back to England with him. But the children want to stay in Moscow, and Frank declines.

Frank's feelings for Lisa can no longer be denied; he makes advances, and she reciprocates.

Lisa takes the children to stay at the family's dacha in the countryside. When Dolly catches Lisa leaving the dacha at night, Lisa says that she should come with her. In a clearing in the wood they see many mysterious and silent figures – unexplained within the novel – each pressing themselves against a separate birch tree. Lisa comments that if Dolly remembers this, "she'll understand in time what she's seen". They return to the dacha, the potent smell of birch sap following Dolly to her bed.

Meanwhile, Selwyn admits his part in Nellie's sudden departure. He tells Frank that Nellie had started to "turn toward the spiritual" and had been on the point of running away with him when his own last-minute scruples had prevented it. Since then, Nellie has been living in a Tolstoyan settlement in England – a settlement that he had earlier recommended to the governess, Muriel Kinsman. Muriel has been writing regularly, and has told him that Nellie recently left as she did not care for the communal life.

Frank receives a call telling him to pick up his children from the railway station, where they have arrived unattended. Lisa had put them on the train to Moscow and had herself caught a train to Berlin. Frank realises that Lisa was not the innocent joiner's daughter that she had pretended, and that she has taken the opportunity to escape from Russia illegally.

Spring has finally arrived, and Frank's servants have completed the annual spring clean and window-opening ritual. The novel ends with Nellie walking back into the house.

== Principal characters ==
- Frank Albertovich Reid: Russian-born print-shop owner of English parents, educated in England
- Nellie (Elena Karlovna) Reid: Frank's English-born wife
- Dolly, 10, Ben, 8, Annie (Annushka), nearly 3: their three children.
- Charlie Cooper: Nellie's brother, a widower who lives in Norbury
- Selwyn Osipych Crane: Frank's English-born chief accountant; idealistic poet and follower of Tolstoy
- Volodya Vasilych (Vladimir Semyonovich Gregoriev): student
- Lisa Ivanovna: shop-girl hired by Frank to look after his children
- Arkady Kuriatin: Muscovite businessman
- Matryona Osipovna Kuriatin: Arkady's wife.
- Muriel Kinsman: English governess
- Cecil/Edwin (Note: The chaplain is named Cecil Graham in Chapter 2, and Edwin Graham in Chapter 9.) Graham: Anglican chaplain in Moscow
- Mrs Graham: chaplain's wife.

== Background ==
Fitzgerald had a strong interest in Russian literature, and starting in the 1960s took courses in Russian language. She visited Moscow and environs in 1975, which included a visit to Tolstoy's house and a dacha in a birch forest.

In the early 1970s, as part of her research on Edward Burne-Jones, Fitzgerald became friends with a Swiss art curator, Mary Chamot, who had been brought up in pre-revolution Russia. Chamot's family had had a greenhouse business in Moscow since the mid-1800s, and they had stayed on for a few years after the revolution. The original title of the novel was to be The Greenhouse. Later, Fitzgerald considered Nellie and Lisa, but her editor did not approve and suggested The Coming of Spring instead, an idea that the author modified for the published title.

== Themes ==
Fitzgerald's historical novel is set in Moscow in 1913, when Russia was on the verge of the cataclysmic changes of the bolshevik revolution. But it conveys also the ambivalence of the 1980s period of perestroika in which it was written.

The scene is set within an anthropomorphized city of Moscow with corrupt bureaucracy, dilapidated buildings, and a climate that is cold and grey for much of the year. The city is filled with testaments to a glorious past, and the population meets the banality of everyday life with humour and passion. Just like Moscow, Fitzgerald's characters are full of contradictions.

The main characters of the novel are English, and the reader sees things through their eyes, creating a sense of otherness that is central to the story: Fitzgerald has a gift for creating a completely known, yet strange, world that is both intensely compressed and seemingly spacious. She liked creating a feeling of strangeness in a world of images, fragments, moments, and of things not said – a characteristic that her biographer Hermione Lee compared with Turgenev.

Via the character of Selwyn, the background presence of Tolstoy is strongly felt within the novel, along with his spiritual epic Resurrection and its opening outburst of spring.

One of Fitzgerald's preoccupations, in this as in her other late novels, is with belief and the soul. The plot is set during Lent and reaches its climax at Easter. Religious symbols and rituals are pervasive, the author projecting her own feeling for religion onto the rituals of the Russian Holy Year and the traditional local beliefs.

The scene in the birch woods, forming part of the oddness and the beauty of the novel, is not explained within the text and seems intentionally ambiguous. The episode is seen through a drowsy child's eyes, and appears ghostly and dreamlike. Fitzgerald leaves it unclear whether the figures are real people, perhaps doukhobors, or are to be interpreted as a dream, or figuratively like The Listeners of Walter de la Mare's poem. Fitzgerald's biographer, however, has stated that her working notes make it clear that the girl was not dreaming but has witnessed a gathering of revolutionary conspirators.

Christopher Knight has noted that Lisa's washing of Dolly's feet with her shawl after the meeting in the wood parallels Jesus's washing of the apostles’ feet at the Last Supper. Lisa's words (“If she remembers it, she’ll understand what she has seen”) echo Jesus’s words to Peter ("What I do thou knowest not now; but thou shalt know hereafter" in John 13, 7). Fitzgerald withholds immediate resolution of her secrets and requires faith in a deeper meaning that will reveal itself in time. In this respect, Fitzgerald's writing has been compared with that of the bible, with the reader's interest being driven by the dramatic gaps in narrative and detail.

== Critical reception ==
The Beginning of Spring received glowing press reviews. Writing for the New York Times Book Review, Robert Plunket compared Fitzgerald to EM Forster and considered the book to be a very good, and very modern, comedy of manners, a work "whose greatest virtue is perhaps the most old-fashioned of all. It is a lovely novel." Anita Brookner was impressed by the author's "calm confidence behind the apparent simplicity of utterance", called her "the mistress of the hint of the sublime", and praised the astonishing virtuosity with which she "mastered a city, a landscape, and a vanished time".

The Daily Telegraph considered the work "marvellous, intelligent and beautifully crafted", The Times Literary Supplement "one of the outstanding novels of the year", The Guardian "a complete success", and the London Review of Books "a tour de force". For The Independent, Jan Morris asked "How is it done?" "How could she know so much about the minutiae of dacha housekeeping or the rituals of hand-printing craft, or the habits of Moscow nightwatchmen, or the nature of the entertainment at the Merchants’ Club?"

The novel was shortlisted for the Booker Prize in 1988. In 2015, it was chosen by Robert McCrum for his List of the 100 best English Novels, assembled for The Guardian.

== Adaptation ==
BBC Radio 4 Extra broadcast a radio adaptation of the novel in 2015.

== Bibliography ==
- Wolfe, Peter (2004). Understanding Penelope Fitzgerald. Columbia: University of South Carolina Press. ISBN 1-57003-561-X.
- Lee, Hermione (2013). Penelope Fitzgerald: A Life. London: Chatto & Windus. ISBN 9780701184957.
