= Hermione Lee =

British academic and writer (born 1948)

Dame Hermione Lee GBE FBA FRSL
- Born: 29 February 1948 (age 78); Winchester, Hampshire, England
- Education: St Hilda's College, Oxford; St Cross College, Oxford (MPhil)
- Occupations: Biographer, literary critic and academic
- Spouse: John Barnard
- Writing career
- Notable works: The Novels of Virginia Woolf; Willa Cather: A Life Saved Up; Body Parts: Essays on Life-Writing
- Notable awards: Dame Grand Cross of the Order of the British Empire
- Website: www.hermionelee.com

Dame Hermione Lee (born 29 February 1948) is a British biographer, literary critic and academic. She is a former president of Wolfson College, Oxford, and a former Goldsmiths' Professor of English Literature in the University of Oxford and professorial fellow of New College. She is a Fellow of the British Academy and of the Royal Society of Literature.

== Early life and education ==
Born in Winchester, Hampshire, daughter of Benjamin Lee (1922–2019), of Polish and Lithuanian Jewish parentage, and Josephine, née Anderson (died 2003), Lee grew up in London, where her father was a GP. She was educated at the Lycée Français Charles de Gaulle, City of London School for Girls, and Queen's College, London. She took a first-class degree in English Literature at St Hilda's College, Oxford, in 1968 and an MPhil at St Cross College, Oxford, in 1970.

== Academic career ==
Lee has taught at the College of William & Mary in Virginia, at the University of Liverpool (where she was awarded an Honorary DLitt in 2002) and at the University of York, from 1977 to 1998, where she held a personal chair in the Department of English and Related Literature, and where she received an Honorary DLitt in 2007. Since 1998, she has been the Goldsmiths' Professor of English Literature and the first woman professorial fellow of New College, Oxford. She succeeded Sir Gareth Roberts as the sixth president of Wolfson College, Oxford, in 2008, serving until the end of academic year 2016–17. She is a lifetime honorary fellow of the Rothermere American Institute at the University of Oxford.

== Honours and fellowships ==
Lee is a Fellow of the British Academy, a Fellow of the Royal Society of Literature, a Fellow of the Rothermere American Institute, University of Oxford, an Honorary Fellow of St Hilda's and St Cross College, Oxford; and a member of the Athenaeum Club.

Appointed a Commander of the Order of the British Empire (CBE) in 2003 for services to literature, Lee was promoted to Dame Commander (DBE) in the 2013 Birthday Honours for services to literary scholarship, and again to Dame Grand Cross (GBE) in the 2023 New Year Honours for services to English literature.

In the US, Lee has been a Visiting Fellow teaching at the Beinecke Library at Yale University, a Whitney J. Oates Fellow at the Council for the Humanities at Princeton, an Everett Helm Visiting Fellow at the Lilly Library at the Indiana University at Bloomington, and the Mel and Lois Tukman Fellow of the New York Public Library's Cullman Center for Scholars and Writers in 2004–05. In 2003, she became a Foreign Honorary Member of the American Academy of Arts and Sciences.

== Writing ==
Lee has written widely on women writers, American literature, life-writing, and modern fiction. Her books include The Novels of Virginia Woolf (1977); a study of the Anglo-Irish novelist Elizabeth Bowen (1981, revised 1999); a short critical book, the first published in Britain, on Philip Roth (1982) and a critical biography of the American novelist Willa Cather, Willa Cather: A Life Saved Up (1989, reissued in a revised edition by Virago in 2008).

She published a major biography of Virginia Woolf (1996), which won the British Academy Rose Mary Crawshay Prize, and was named as one of The New York Times Book Review′s best books of 1997.

Lee has published a collection of essays on biography and autobiography, Body Parts: Essays on Life-Writing (2005), and a biography of Edith Wharton, published to mixed reviews in 2007 by Chatto & Windus and Knopf. In 2013 the playwright Tom Stoppard asked her to write his biography. It was published in 2020.

She has edited and introduced numerous editions and anthologies of Kipling, Trollope, Virginia Woolf, Stevie Smith, Elizabeth Bowen, Willa Cather, Eudora Welty, and Penelope Fitzgerald. She was one of the co-editors of the Oxford Poets Anthologies from 1999 to 2002.

Lee is also known for her reviews, including for The Guardian, The New York Review of Books, and her work in the media. From 1982 to 1986, she presented Channel Four's first books programme, Book Four, and she contributes regularly to Front Row and other radio arts programmes. She chaired the Judges for the Man Booker Prize for Fiction in 2006, and has judged many other literary prizes. She has served on the literature advisory panels of the Arts Council and the British Council.

In writing her major biography of Tom Stoppard (2020), Lee was granted unprecedented access to the playwright's papers, letters and diaries, and conducted extensive interviews with key figures such as Felicity Kendal, Trevor Nunn, and Stoppard himself.

It was announced in 2021 that Chatto & Windus had signed a deal with Lee for her biography of writer Anita Brookner. That book was published in 2026.

== Personal life ==
Lee is married to Professor John Barnard, professor emeritus of the University of Leeds.

== Awards ==
- 1997 – Rose Mary Crawshay Prize for Virginia Woolf
- 2003 – Commander of the Order of the British Empire (CBE)
- 2013 – Dame Commander of the Order of the British Empire (DBE)
- 2013 – James Tait Black Memorial Prize for Penelope Fitzgerald: A Life
- 2015 – Plutarch Award for Penelope Fitzgerald: A Life
- 2023 – Dame Grand Cross of the Order of the British Empire (GBE)

== Partial bibliography ==
- The Novels of Virginia Woolf (1977; reissued 2009) ISBN 978-0-415-56242-3
- Elizabeth Bowen: An Estimation 'Critical Studies' series (1981; revised 1999) ISBN 978-0-854-78344-1
- Philip Roth 'Contemporary Writers' series (1982) ISBN 978-0-416-32980-3
- Willa Cather: A Life Saved Up (1989) ISBN 978-0-860-68661-3
  - US edition: Willa Cather: Double Lives (1990) ISBN 978-0-394-53703-0
- Virginia Woolf (1996) ISBN 978-0-701-16507-9
- Body Parts: Essays on Life-Writing (2005) ISBN 978-0-701-17759-1
- Virginia Woolf's Nose: Essays on Biography (2005) ISBN 978-0-691-12032-4
- Edith Wharton (2007) ISBN 978-0-701-16665-6
- Biography: A Very Short Introduction (2009) ISBN 978-0-199-53354-1
- Penelope Fitzgerald: A Life (2013) ISBN 978-0-701-18495-7
- Lives of Houses editor, with Kate Kennedy (2020) ISBN 978-0-691-19366-3
- Tom Stoppard: A Life (2020) ISBN 978-0-571-31443-0
- Anita Brookner: Art & Life. Chatto & Windus. 2026. ISBN 9781784744687.

Academic offices
Preceded by Jon Stallworthy (acting)	President of Wolfson College, Oxford; 2008–2018	Succeeded by Philomen Probert (acting)
Awards and achievements
Preceded by: Kate Flint; Ruth Smith	Rose Mary Crawshay Prize; 1997	Succeeded by: Moyra Haslett; Katie Trumpener
