= Gough McCormick =

Dean of Manchester (1874–1924)

Joseph Gough McCormick (1874–1924) was Dean of Manchester in the first quarter of the 20th century.

Born into an ecclesiastical (and cricketing) family in London in 1874, he was educated at Exeter School and St John's College, Cambridge. He was ordained in 1897. He began his career at Great Yarmouth, where as a keen amateur cricketer, he played minor counties cricket for Norfolk from 1899 to 1909, making thirty appearances. He was later vicar of St Paul's, Princes Park, Liverpool. Later he was Vicar of St. Michael's Church, Chester Square and an Honorary Chaplain to the King before his elevation to the Deanery. He died in post on 30 August 1924.

== Notes ==
Church of England titles
Preceded by William Swayne	Dean of Manchester; 1920 – 1924	Succeeded by Hewlett Johnson
