= Archibald Boyd =

Dean of Exeter

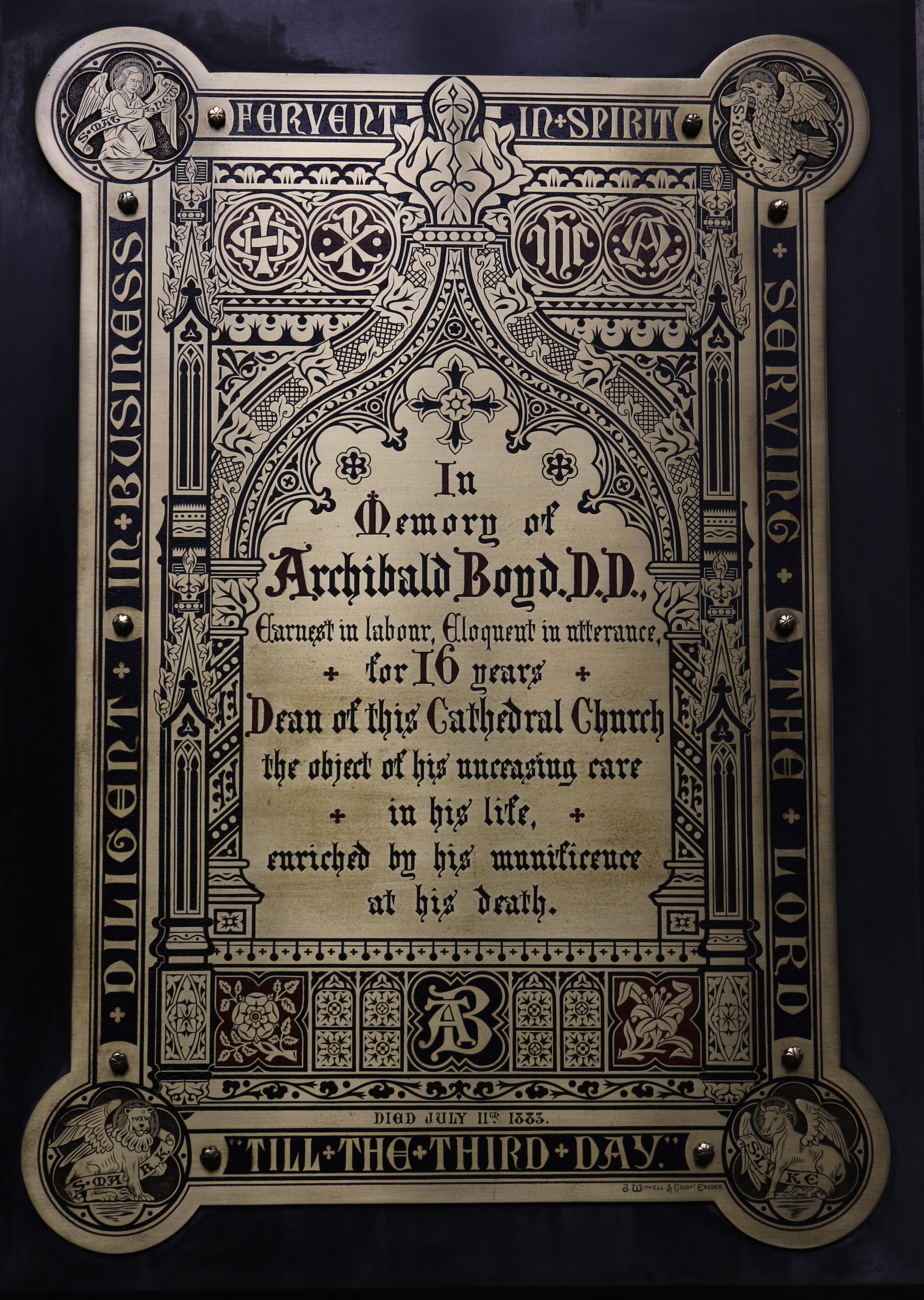
- Memorial in Exeter Cathedral
- Born: 1803; Derry, Northern Ireland
- Died: 11 July 1883 (aged 79–80); Exeter, England
- Education: Trinity College, Dublin
- Occupation: Dean of Exeter
- Years active: 1823–1883
- Known for: English clergyman and minister
- Parent(s): Archibald Boyd, Sarah Bodden
- Relatives: William Boyd-Carpenter (nephew)

Archibald Boyd (1803 – 11 July 1883) was Dean of Exeter in the Church of England.

== Life ==
Born in 1803 in Derry, Ireland, Boyd was the son of Archibald Boyd, treasurer of Derry. After being educated at the diocesan college in that city, proceeded to Trinity College, Dublin, where he graduated B.A. 1823, proceeding to Master of Arts M.A. 1834, and B.D. and D.D. long after, in 1868.

He officiated as curate and preacher in the cathedral in Derry from 1827 to 1842, and here he first distinguished himself as an able and powerful preacher, as a controversialist, and as an author. At that time the controversy between the presbyterians and the Church of Ireland in the north of Ireland was at its height. Boyd came to the defence of the church and preached a series of discourses in reply to attacks. These discourses attracted great attention, and were afterwards printed. In 1842, he was appointed perpetual curate of Christ Church Cheltenham. With Francis Close, his fellow-worker here, he joined in a scheme for establishing additional Sunday schools, infant schools, and bible classes. For eight years after 1859, he was entrusted with the care of Paddington.

=== Dean of Exeter ===
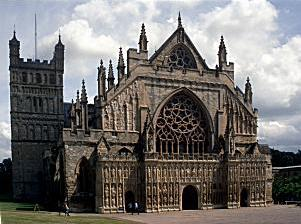
Cathedral Church of Saint Peter at Exeter where Boyd served as Dean.

On 11 November 1867 he accepted the deanery of Exeter, and resigned, with his vicarage, an honorary canonry in Gloucester Cathedral, which he had held since 1857. He was a preaching and a working dean. He was a firm but moderate evangelical, and was a voluminous writer on the ecclesiastical questions of the day. His name is connected with the—at the time well-known—Exeter reredos case. The dean and chapter erected in the cathedral, 1872–3, a stone reredos, on which were sculptured representations in bas-relief of the Ascension, the Transfiguration, and the Descent of the Holy Ghost, with some figures of angels. In accordance with a petition presented by William John Phillpotts, chancellor of the diocese, the bishop (Frederick Temple) on 7 January 1874 declared the reredos to be contrary to law and ordered its removal. After much litigation touching the bishop's jurisdiction in the matter, the structure was declared not illegal by the Judicial Committee of the Privy Council on 25 February 1875

== Death and legacy ==
On the continent during the autumn of 1882, Boyd met with an accident at Vienna, from the effects of which he never fully recovered. He died at the deanery, Exeter, on 11 July 1883, bequeathing nearly £40,000 to various societies and institutions in the diocese of Exeter. He left behind his wife, Frances, the daughter of Thomas Waller of Ospringe, and widow of the Rev. Robert Day Denny. She herself died on 6 January 1877.

=== Works ===
His works include:

- Sermons on the Church, or the Episcopacy, Liturgy, and Ceremonies of the Church of England 1838
- Episcopacy, Ordination, Lay-eldership, and Liturgies 1839
- Episcopacy and Presbytery 1841
- England, Rome, and Oxford compared as to certain Doctrines 1846
- The History of the Book of Common Prayer 1850
- Turkey and the Turks 1853
- Baptism and Baptismal Regeneration 1865
- Confession, Absolution, and the Real Presence 1867
- The Book of Common Prayer 1869

He also printed many single sermons and minor publications.

== Notes ==
Church of England titles
| Preceded by William John Brodrick | Dean of Exeter; 1867 – 1883 | Succeeded by Benjamin Morgan Cowie |
