= Hensley Henson =

English Anglican bishop (1863–1947)

The Right Reverend Hensley Henson
- Bishop of Durham
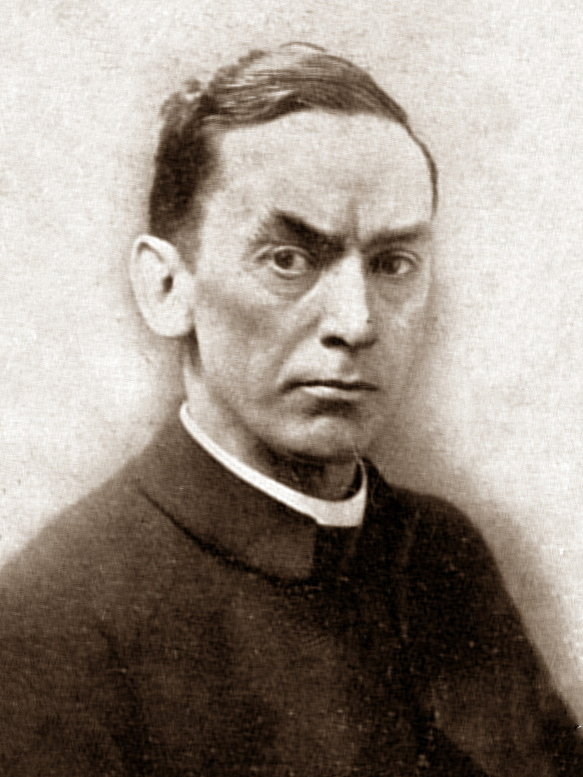
- 1920 portrait
- Church: Church of England
- Province: York
- Diocese: Durham
- In office: 1920–1939
- Predecessor: Handley Moule
- Successor: Alwyn Williams
- Other posts: Bishop of Hereford (1918–1920); Dean of Durham (1913–1918)

Orders
- Ordination: 1887 (deacon); 1888 (priest)
- Consecration: 1918

Personal details
- Born: 8 November 1863 London, England
- Died: 27 September 1947 (aged 83) Hintlesham, England
- Buried: Durham Cathedral, England
- Education: All Souls College, Oxford

Herbert Hensley Henson (8 November 1863 – 27 September 1947) was an English Anglican cleric, scholar and polemicist. He was Bishop of Hereford from 1918 to 1920 and Bishop of Durham from 1920 to 1939.

Henson's father was a devout follower of the Christian sect the Plymouth Brethren and disapproved of schools. Henson was not allowed to go to school until he was fourteen, and was largely self-educated. He was admitted to the University of Oxford, and gained a first-class degree in 1884. In the same year he was elected as a fellow of All Souls College, Oxford, and began to make a reputation as a speaker. He was ordained priest in 1888. Feeling a vocation to minister to the urban poor, Henson served in the East End of London and Barking before becoming the chaplain of Ilford Hospital Chapel, a 12th-century hospice in Ilford, in 1895. In 1900 he was appointed to the prominent post of rector of St Margaret's, Westminster, and canon of Westminster Abbey. While there, and subsequently as Dean of Durham (1913–1918), he wrote prolifically and sometimes controversially. He was tolerant of a wide range of theological views; because of this, some members of the Anglo-Catholic wing of the Church of England accused him of heresy and sought unsuccessfully to block his appointment as Bishop of Hereford in 1917.

In 1920, after two years in the largely rural diocese of Hereford, Henson returned to Durham in the industrial north-east of England as its bishop. The area was badly affected by an economic depression. Henson was opposed to strikes, trade unions and socialism, and for a time his outspoken denunciation of them made him unpopular in the diocese. Some of his opinions changed radically during his career: at first a strong advocate of the Church of England's continued establishment as the country's official church, he came to believe that politicians could not be trusted to legislate properly on ecclesiastical matters, and he espoused the cause of disestablishment. He campaigned against prohibition, the exploitation of foreign workers by British companies, and fascist and Nazi aggression. He supported reform of the divorce laws, the controversial 1928 revision of the Book of Common Prayer, and ecumenism.

== Life and career ==
=== Early years ===
Herbert Hensley Henson was born in London on 8 November 1863, the fourth son and sixth child of eight of Thomas Henson, a businessman, and his second wife, Martha, née Fear. Thomas, raised in a farming family in Devon, quarrelled with his father and left home as a young man to go into business in London. By 1865, when Hensley was two years old, Thomas had prospered enough to buy a property in Broadstairs on the coast of Kent to retire there and devote himself to gardening and religion. In his three volumes of memoirs, written towards the end of his life, Henson was conspicuously reticent about his childhood, devoting three and a half pages out of the total of nearly 1,200 to his first eighteen years, but it is clear that Thomas Henson was a zealous evangelical Christian who had renounced the Church of England and later became a follower of the Plymouth Brethren.

My father's evangelicalism was deepened and darkened by his bereavement. He seemed to lose interest in everything except religion, and under the influence of some Plymouth Brethren ... his religion degenerated into bigotry. He never joined the sect, but he read their literature, shared many of their opinions and grew into their narrow intolerance.

— Hensley Henson

Henson's biographer John Peart-Binns writes that Henson senior's "bleak outlook on the world" and "feeling of urgency to be prepared for the Second Coming" caused his family life to be one of all-pervading darkness. His wife shielded the children from the worst excesses of what the biographer Matthew Grimley describes as Thomas's "bigotry", but in 1870 she died, and, in Henson's words, "with her died our happiness". Grimley comments that Henson's unhappy childhood "could have come straight out of the pages of Charles Dickens".

As an adult Henson remembered Harriet Beecher Stowe's anti-slavery novel Uncle Tom's Cabin as the first book that moved him. Thomas Henson forbade his children to go to school, play with other children, or go on holiday. Chadwick writes that deprived of outlets except religion, the family, and his father's books, Hensley "escaped into the library. At an early age he became the voracious reader of the family." The family library lacked fiction for boys; the young Henson instead read such works as Foxe's Book of Martyrs, John Bunyan's The Pilgrim's Progress and John Milton's Paradise Lost. Chadwick comments that by the age of fourteen "this prodigious boy had read as deeply in divinity as many young men when they take holy orders." The young Henson became a dedicated Christian and felt a vocation for the Anglican priesthood; his father's fundamentalist views were anathema, and left him with what Grimley calls "an enduring hatred of protestant fanaticism".

In 1873 Thomas Henson remarried; (Note: It is not clear whether there was any formal or legal wedding; the sect that Henson senior followed discouraged legal ceremonies.) Emma Parker, widow of a Lutheran pastor, ensured that the children were properly educated. In Henson's phrase, "she recreated the home". She introduced him to the works of Walter Scott and translations of classical authors such as Thucydides and Plutarch, helping to form his literary style. He wrote later, "It was a curiously mixed bag, but I absorbed it with avidity". He remained devoted to her – he called her Carissima – and once he was an adult he cared for her until her death in 1924.

His father did not allow Henson to be baptised or to attend a school until the boy was fourteen. The rector of Broadstairs conducted the baptism; there were no godparents, and the young Henson undertook their functions himself. He took religious instruction from the rector, leading to his confirmation as a communicant member of the Church of England in 1878. At Broadstairs Collegiate School he learned what he called "a smattering of Latin and Greek". That apart, he found he derived little educational benefit, having already educated himself widely and deeply from books in his father's library. He rose to be head boy of the school, but in 1879, after a dispute with the headmaster during which Henson expressed "with more passion than respect" his opinion of the head – whom he held in contempt – he at once voluntarily left the school.

Henson then found a post as an assistant master at Brigg Grammar School in Lincolnshire; the headmaster there recognised his talent and recommended that he should apply for admission to the University of Oxford. Thomas Henson was against the idea, partly because his financial means had declined, but was talked round by his wife and gave his consent. He agreed to fund his son's studies, but the sum he allowed was too little to pay the substantial fees for residence at any of the colleges of the university. In 1881 Henson applied successfully for admission as an unattached student, a member of none of the Oxford colleges, but eligible for the full range of university tuition. Cut off from the camaraderie of college life, Henson felt seriously isolated. He concentrated on his studies, and gained a first class honours degree in Modern History in June 1884.

=== All Souls ===
Influences and benefactors: Sir William Anson (top), William Rathbone, and Charles Gore

Such was the quality of Henson's scholarship that his history tutor encouraged him to enter the annual competition for appointment as a fellow of All Souls, the university's post-graduate research college. (Note: All Souls describes itself as primarily an academic research institution. Although its fellows are involved in teaching and supervision of research, there are no undergraduate members of the college.) He was appointed in November 1884, at the age of twenty. Membership of the college offered an annual stipend of £200 (equivalent to £21,488 in 2025); for the first time, Henson was in reasonably comfortable financial circumstances. (Note: The biographer John Peart-Binns notes that from his £200 a year Henson made substantial contributions to his family as his father's financial affairs deteriorated to the point of bankruptcy.) At All Souls, he later wrote, "I was welcomed with a generous kindness which made me feel immediately at home. I formed friendships which have enriched my life." Peart-Binns suggests that Henson may nonetheless have remained something of an outsider, his arrival at All Souls "akin to that of an alien". The college was headed by the warden, Sir William Anson, who became something of a father figure to Henson, and encouraged his researches. Henson's first paper, on William II of England, attracted attention. Peart-Binns comments, "He knew how to hold an audience in thrall by using language which developed into 'Hensonia' ... Charles Oman, Chichele Professor of Modern History was gripped by Henson's 'extraordinary ability'". Aware that his quick tongue could lead him into indiscretion, he adopted and maintained all his life the practice of writing out his lectures and sermons in full beforehand rather than improvising or speaking from concise notes. He preferred a quill pen, and wrote in a fine clear hand; he considered illegible writing to be a form of bad manners as tiresome as inaudible talking. He gained a reputation as a controversialist. In a biographical sketch, Harold Begbie wrote that at Oxford Henson was nicknamed "Coxley Cocksure"; he added:

Never was any man more certain he was right; never was any man more inclined to ridicule the bare idea that his opponent could be anything but wrong; and never was any man more thoroughly happy in making use of a singularly trenchant intellect to stab and thrust its triumphant way through the logic of his adversary.

In 1885, in tandem with his work at All Souls, Henson acted as tutor to Lyle Rathbone, son of the philanthropic businessman William Rathbone. The family lived in Birkenhead, where for six months Henson stayed with them. He had ample leisure time, much of which he spent in visiting local churches and nonconformist chapels. This process left him struggling with doctrinal questions, but sure of a religious vocation. The day after his return to Oxford in October he went into St Mary's, Iffley, and with his hand on the altar vowed to dedicate himself to God and the Church of England.

Henson's beliefs on doctrine were still forming, but he inclined to high-churchmanship and was influenced by Charles Gore and the Puseyites, though he was unattracted by more extreme Anglo-Catholic forms of ritualism. With his suspicion of nonconformism he was a proponent of the principle of establishment – the maintenance of Anglicanism as the official state religion – and in 1886 he became secretary of the new Oxford Laymen's League for Defence of the National Church, to counter the threat of disestablishment proposed by politicians such as Joseph Chamberlain and Charles Dilke.

=== Ordination and east London ===
The poverty Henson had seen in deprived areas of Birkenhead during his six months with the Rathbones gave him a strong impetus to minister to the poor. In 1887, after being ordained deacon, he took charge of the Oxford House Settlement, a high-church mission in Bethnal Green, a poor area of the East End of London. While in this post he further honed his speaking skills in public debates with atheist orators, many from the National Secular Society's office in Bethnal Green.

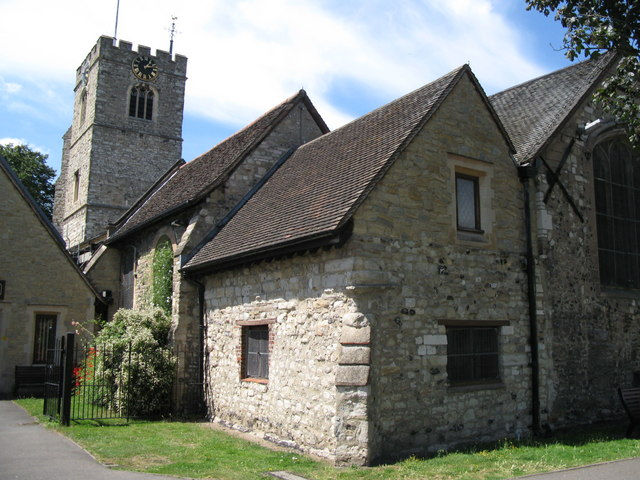
St Margaret's, Barking, Henson's first parish

In 1888 Henson was ordained priest. Shortly afterwards All Souls appointed him vicar of a church in its gift: St Margaret's, Barking, in east London, a working class parish, with a population of 12,000, and increasing. At twenty-five he was the youngest vicar in the country, and had a large staff of curates to manage. An All Souls colleague, Cosmo Lang, himself on the brink of a Church career, visited Henson at Barking and noted, "He came six months ago to a parish dead – 250 a good congregation in the church; and now, when he preaches, every seat is filled – 1100!"

With the energy and impetuosity noted by Lang, Henson worked continually over the next seven years to improve the parish, restoring the fabric of the church, opening clubs for his parishioners, and holding popular open-air services in the vicarage grounds. At Barking his high-church leanings were welcomed, and he was invited to preach from time to time at St Alban's Holborn, a central London bastion of Anglo-Catholicism. He was never physically strong, and his relentless work at Barking put a strain on his health. In 1895 he accepted an offer from Lord Salisbury (Note: Salisbury owned much of the land around St Margaret's, Barking. As a former fellow of All Souls he knew Henson, and they were in contact during the early 1890s about parish matters. Salisbury was master and patron of St Mary's Hospital, Ilford, with the right to appoint its warden.) of a less arduous post, the chaplaincy of St Mary's Hospital, Ilford, which he held until 1900. In 1895 and 1896 Henson was Select Preacher (official preacher to the university) at Oxford, and from 1897 he served as chaplain to John Festing, Bishop of St Albans. He had time for writing; between 1897 and 1900 he published four books, ranging from purely theological studies to analyses of Church politics. His beliefs had changed from his early high-churchmanship to a broad-church latitudinarianism; his 1899 Cui bono? set out his concerns about the strict ritualists in the Anglo-Catholic wing of the Church of England.

=== Westminster ===
Henson when Rector of St Margaret's

The Ilford appointment had been in Salisbury's personal gift; in his official capacity as Prime Minister he was responsible for Henson's next appointment: rector of St Margaret's, Westminster, and canon of Westminster Abbey in 1900. St Margaret's, the parish church of the British parliament, was a prominent appointment, bringing him into the public eye; he followed predecessors as willing as he to court controversy including Henry Hart Milman and Frederic Farrar. His eventual successor as Bishop of Durham, Alwyn Williams wrote that at St Margaret's, Henson's brilliance as a speaker and independence of thought attracted large congregations and "his increasingly liberal churchmanship" appealed to a wide range of public opinion, though some of his views offended the orthodox.

In October 1902 at Westminster Abbey Henson married Isabella (Ella) Caroline, the only daughter of James Wallis Dennistoun of Dennistoun, Scotland. The ceremony was performed by Arthur Winnington-Ingram, Bishop of London, and Lang, now Bishop of Stepney. Grimley comments that it was in keeping with Henson's usual impulsiveness that he proposed within four days of meeting her. The marriage was lifelong; there were no children. To their great sorrow, his wife twice miscarried, in 1905, (Note: After the second miscarriage, Henson wrote in his journal, "What a second holocaust of hopes & loves within half a year!") and did not conceive after that.

Henson with his Aberdeen terrier, Logic, caricatured by Wallace Hester in Vanity Fair, 1912

From his pulpit, Henson spoke against the view that ecumenism was, as W. E. Gladstone once called it, "a moral monster", and he criticised schools that failed to provide adequate religious instruction. Preaching at Westminster Abbey in 1912 he attracted international attention for naming and denouncing three British directors of the Peruvian Amazon Company for what The Times called the "Putumayo atrocities" – the mass enslavement and brutal treatment of indigenous Peruvians in the company's rubber factories. (Note: Although the company attempted to impugn Henson's reputation, the British government appointed a select committee to investigate the directors' responsibility. The Times reported that the directors' actions were judged unacceptable and Henson's criticisms justified.) Looking back in old age, Henson rated this as the most important of the utterances in which he spoke for a nation's revulsion against wickedness.

During his time at St Margaret's Henson published nine books, some of them collected sermons and lectures, others on theological questions and the role of Christianity in modern society. Both as a canon of Westminster and rector of St Margaret's, Henson was not under the authority of any bishop. (Note: The Abbey is a royal peculiar and at St Margaret's the rectors, unlike other parish priests, were not formally installed by the Bishop of London who had no jurisdiction over the parish.) His independence enabled him to defend those liberal clergy in conflict with their bishops about doctrinal matters such as the historicity of the empty tomb and the reality of miracles. Peart-Binns comments, "He began to be accused of heresy which would accelerate to a climax when he was nominated to the See of Hereford".

His uncompromising character brought Henson into frequent conflict with old friends and colleagues. In 1909 he offended Charles Gore, now Bishop of Birmingham, by defying Gore's order not to preach in the institute of a Congregational church in the diocese. (Note: Gore's specific objection was not to Henson's preaching in a nonconformist establishment, but his doing so within another Anglican cleric's parish against the incumbent's wishes. The distinction was not widely noted, and the bishop was seen by many to have been narrow-minded. Henson's defiant act in having Gore's document of "inhibition" framed and hung in the study of St Margaret's rectory was felt by many to be needlessly provocative.) His confrontational style and liberal theology caused delay in his promotion, despite his obvious abilities. A story, probably apocryphal, circulated in 1908 that the Prime Minister, H. H. Asquith, suggested Henson's name to Edward VII when the see of York became vacant, and the king replied, "Damn it all, man, I am Defender of the Faith!" In 1910 the post of Dean of Lincoln fell vacant. Asquith considered appointing Henson, but decided, as he told the Archbishop of Canterbury, Randall Davidson, that "it would be rather like sending a destroyer into a land-locked pool".

=== Dean and bishop ===
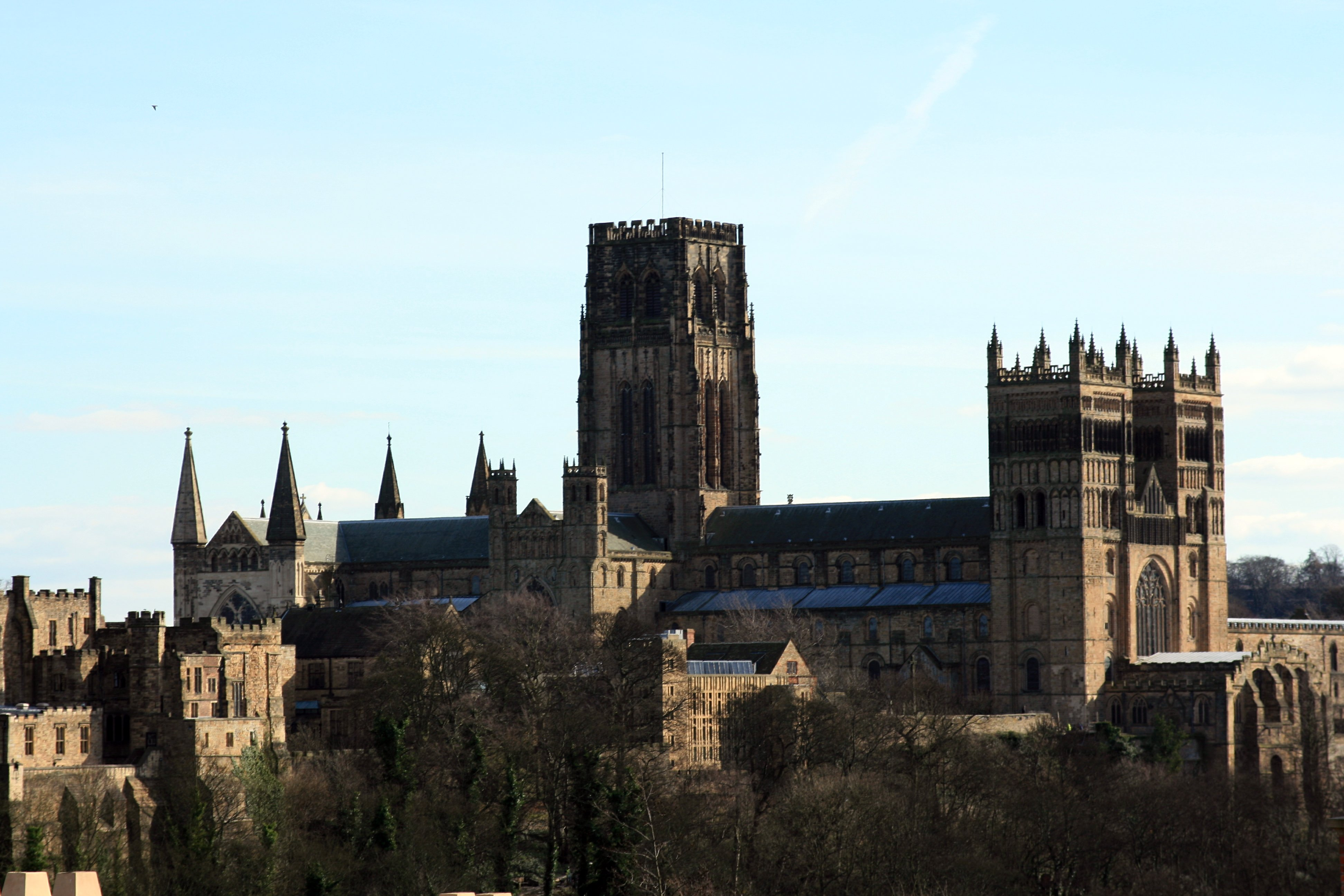
Durham Cathedral

In 1912 the Dean of Durham, George Kitchin, died. The Bishop, Handley Moule, hoped the Prime Minister would appoint Henry Watkins, the Archdeacon of Durham, but Asquith chose Henson. On 2 January 1913 Moule presided over Henson's formal installation at Durham Cathedral.

The five years Henson spent as Dean of Durham were marked by further controversy, including his objection to the existing divorce laws as too favourable to men and unfair to women. He was hostile to changes aimed at giving the Church more control over its own affairs; he regarded establishment and parliamentary control as safeguards against extremism. He opposed William Temple's "Life and Liberty movement", which campaigned for synodical and democratic government of the Church, and he was against the establishment of the National Assembly of the Church of England in 1919. To Henson, the essence of Anglicanism rested on parliamentary enforcement of the rights of the laity of the Church against the bishops and priests, and the inclusion of both clergy and laity in all matters under the rule of the monarch as Supreme Governor of the Church.

Among other views for which Henson was known were his disapproval of teetotalism campaigns and of socialism, and for his disbelief in social reform as an ally of religion. When the Kikuyu controversy erupted in 1913 he once again found himself at odds with Gore. The question was whether the bishops of Mombasa and Uganda had committed heresy by taking part in an ecumenical service. Gore and his ally Bishop Weston of Zanzibar led the charge, and appear in Henson's journal as "devoted, unselfish, indefatigable, eminently gifted, but ... also fanatical in temper, bigoted in their beliefs, and reckless in their methods." Together with Bishop Moule, Dean Wace of Canterbury and other leaders, Henson strongly, and successfully, supported the accused bishops: "The Church owes a deep debt of gratitude to the Bishops of Uganda and Mombasa."

After the First World War broke out in 1914 Henson spoke forcefully about what he saw as "the moral obligation to resist Germany in her career of cynical and violent aggression", but according to Peart-Binns, although he sought to sustain worshippers' spirits despite the horrors of the war, "he refused to give false hope to congregations in their understandable demands for vehemence and violence". In 1916 he contributed an essay on "The Church of England after the War" to a symposium, The Faith and the War, calling for "genuine cosmopolitanism" in religious and international political affairs.

Henson spoke out strongly, and ultimately unsuccessfully, against the proposed disestablishment of the Anglican Church in Wales. In the course of doing so he addressed many nonconformist gatherings; the historian Owen Chadwick suggests that this may have commended him to David Lloyd George, who became Prime Minister in 1916. (Note: Lloyd George was from a nonconformist family, like the majority of Welsh people, though agnostic himself.) A serious doctrinal row within the Church seemed to many to put Henson out of the running for elevation to a bishopric. He had defended the right of clergy to express doubts about the virgin birth and bodily resurrection. He was, as many of his critics failed, or refused, to notice, doctrinally orthodox on the resurrection, and content to accept the tradition of the virgin birth, but his contention that other priests had the right to question them was regarded as heretical by the Anglo-Catholic wing of the Church, led by Gore. (Note: Henson's view has generally prevailed over that of Gore and his followers: in a study published in 1998, the theologian William Barclay observes, "It seems fair to say that there are today a considerable number of Churches in which, while it may be orthodox to accept the doctrine of the Virgin Birth, it is certainly not heresy to reject it".)

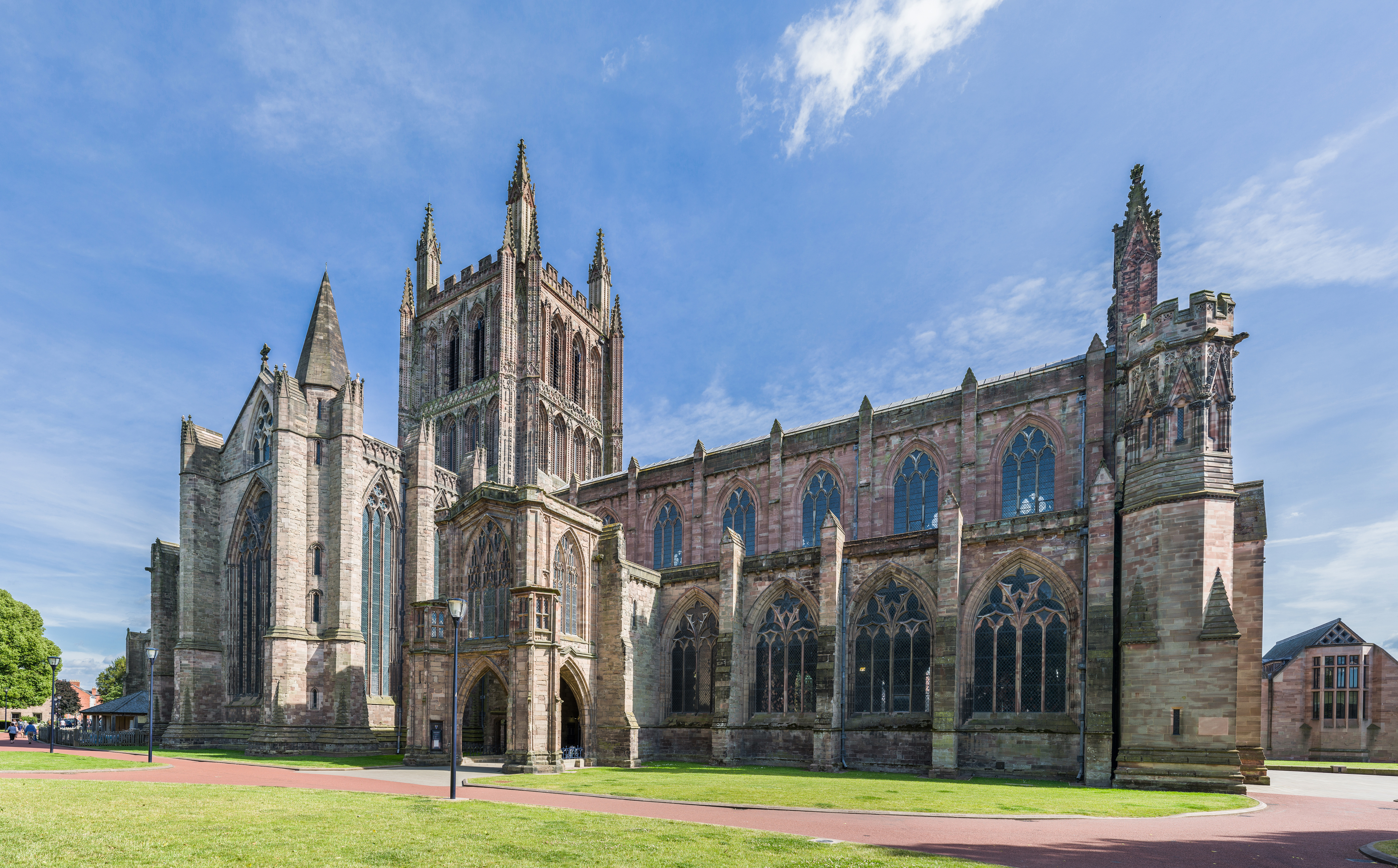
Hereford Cathedral

Archbishop Davidson had no doubts about Henson's doctrinal soundness, and persuaded him to issue a statement of faith to silence his critics. Davidson stated publicly that no fair-minded people could read a series of Henson's sermons without feeling that they had in him a brilliant and powerful teacher of the Christian faith. Gore and his followers were obliged to call off their protests. Against Davidson's advice for caution, Lloyd George appointed Henson to the vacant see of Hereford in 1917. Gore and others, including Cosmo Lang, now the Archbishop of York, failed to attend the consecration service. Their attitude hurt Henson, offended lay opinion in the Church, and was criticised in the press. Henson was consecrated bishop in Westminster Abbey on 4 February 1918 by Davidson, assisted by twelve supporting bishops. He was enthroned at Hereford Cathedral eight days later.

Although Henson's elevation was controversial among factions of the clergy – in general lay people supported his appointment – it nevertheless gave fresh impetus to the idea of taking away from prime ministers the power to choose bishops. (Note: Theoretically, the power to choose whom to appoint remained (and still remains) with the monarch, but the exercise of the royal prerogative had passed to the prime minister in the 19th century.) Gore attempted to promote the idea at the Convocation of Clergy in May 1918; Henson abandoned restraint and in Chadwick's words "stripped Gore's arguments bare". He argued from historical examples that appointments made at the Church's instigation were partisan and disastrous, and that the Crown and prime minister were able to take an unbiased view in the national interest. Despite the public support for him, the controversy revived Henson's feelings of isolation.

An anonymous critic described Henson's appointment to the see of Hereford as "sending an armoured car into an orchard of apple trees" and Henson had doubts about accepting a mainly rural diocese rather than ministering to the urban poor. Lloyd George told him that he would have preferred to offer him a see with "a large and industrial population", and hoped to transfer him to one if he succeeded at Hereford.

The clergy and laity of Hereford gave Henson a warm welcome, and he enjoyed working with the incumbents of country parishes. They appreciated his delicacy in not intruding unduly into local church concerns, and it was remarked that "he treated all the world as his equals". During his time at Hereford he published only one book, Christian Liberty (1918), a collection of sermons.

Henson was an active Freemason. At Hereford, he and the dean, Reginald Waterfield, were among the founders of a new masonic lodge in 1920. Peart-Binns describes him as enjoying the meetings of his various lodges, but finding the associated social activities "intolerable". Henson was outspoken as an apologist for Freemasonry, promoting its ideals, and its religious foundations.

There was regret in the diocese that Henson's tenure there was brief. In 1920 the see of Durham became vacant on the death of Bishop Moule. Davidson wanted Thomas Strong, Dean of Christ Church, to be appointed and pressed his claims on Lloyd George, but the Prime Minister took the view that the area needed Henson's practical skills and common touch rather than Strong's academic scholarship. (Note: Moule and his two immediate predecessors at Durham, Joseph Lightfoot and Brooke Foss Westcott, had all been all professors of divinity at the University of Cambridge immediately before their appointment as bishop.)

=== Durham ===
Henson enthroned as Bishop of Durham, with Dean Welldon to his left, 1920

Henson was translated to Durham – England's most senior diocese after Canterbury, York and London – in October 1920. The appointment was challenging: the Durham area was in grave economic difficulty, with the important coal-mining industry in a crisis caused by falling industrial demand for coal in the years after the First World War. Ecclesiastically there was potential for friction, as the Dean of Durham, James Welldon, who had once been a diocesan bishop himself, (Note: Welldon had been Bishop of Calcutta from 1898 to 1902, before resigning and returning to Britain, where he served as Dean of Manchester from 1906 to 1918 and Dean of Durham from 1918 to 1933.) was temperamentally and politically at odds with his new superior, and given to publicly expressing views contrary to Henson's. Welldon, in Henson's view, "could neither speak with effect nor be silent with dignity". They clashed on several occasions, most conspicuously when Welldon, an advocate for prohibition, openly opposed Henson's tolerant views on the consumption of alcohol. (Note: Welldon's enthusiasm for teetotalism did not extend to himself: Henson recorded in his journal that Sir David Drummond mentioned sharing a bottle of champagne with Welldon at dinner the previous week.) Relations between the deanery and Auckland Castle, the bishop's official residence, improved markedly in April 1933 when Cyril Alington, the Head Master of Eton College from 1917 to 1933, succeeded Welldon after the latter's retirement. Alington was almost universally loved, and though he and Henson differed on points of ecclesiastical practice, they remained warm friends.

At the beginning of Henson's episcopate most Durham miners were on strike. He got on well with miners individually and conversed with many of them as they walked through the extensive grounds of Auckland Castle. Chadwick writes that it was said of Henson that he got on easily with everyone "except other dignitaries in gaiters". (Note: Henson's relations even with his gaiter-wearing (i.e. episcopal or other senior clerical) colleagues could be warm. He and his principal adversary in the Kikuyu controversy, Bishop Weston, later became good friends.) Friction arose from Henson's belief that strikes were morally wrong because of the harm they did to other working people, and he had, in Grimley's words, "a violent, almost obsessional", dislike of trade unions. His early concern for the welfare of the poor remained unchanged, but he regarded socialism and trade unionism as negations of individuality. He was also against state provision of social welfare, though a strong advocate of voluntary spending on it. Later in his bishopric Henson denounced the Jarrow March of 1936 as "revolutionary mob pressure" and criticised his subordinate, James Gordon, the suffragan Bishop of Jarrow, for giving the march his formal blessing. Henson loathed class distinction, and was not antipathetic to social reformers, but he was strong in his criticism of Christian campaigners who maintained that the first duty of the Church was social reform. To Henson, the Church's principal concern was each individual's spiritual welfare.

Cosmo Lang by William Orpen: "proud, pompous and prelatical"

The best-known anecdote of Henson, according to Chadwick, comes from his time at Durham. Archbishop Lang complained that his portrait by William Orpen "makes me look proud, pompous and prelatical", to which Henson responded, "And may I ask Your Grace to which of these epithets Your Grace has taken exception?" (Grimley remarks that on occasion each of those unflattering adjectives applied just as much to Henson.) Nonetheless, Henson ranked Lang "among the greater figures of ecclesiastical history".

The most conspicuous cause with which Henson was involved during his time at Durham was, in Anglican terms, of national – and even international – rather than diocesan concern. As a broad churchman he gave strong support in the mid-1920s to the major revision and modernising of the Book of Common Prayer, the Church of England's liturgical book – largely unchanged since 1662 – in its proposed 1927 and 1928 editions. The evangelical wing of the Church opposed the revision, which some low-church factions dubbed "popish". (Note: Evangelicals objected to, among other things, an epiclesis (invoking the Holy Spirit to descend on the communion elements of bread and wine), and the continuous reservation of consecrated bread and wine. Other objections included the wearing of chasubles, prayers for the souls of the dead and changes to the communion service repositioning the Prayer of Oblation and reducing the prayers for the sovereign.) Henson, now on the same side as the Anglo-Catholics with whom he had earlier been in bitter dispute, called the opposition "the Protestant underworld". Despite the clear majority of clergy and laity in favour of the revision, the House of Commons refused to authorise it, and voted it down in 1927 and again in 1928. Henson's colleague Cyril Garbett wrote that the Commons had "made it plain that the Church does not possess full spiritual freedom to determine its worship". The Church instituted damage-limitation measures by permitting parishes to use the new unauthorised text where there was a local consensus to do so, (Note: The new text was published in December 1928 and carried the statement in bold type that "the publication of this Book does not directly or indirectly imply that it can be regarded as authorized for use in churches".) but Henson was horrified at what he saw as Parliament's betrayal of its duty to preside impartially over the governance of the Church, giving in to pressure from what he termed "an army of illiterates".

Together with the suspicions he had started to harbour that a socialist government might misuse ecclesiastical patronage, the Prayer Book debacle turned Henson from a strong proponent of establishment to its best-known critic. He spent much time and energy fruitlessly campaigning for disestablishment. He was, as he had often been earlier in his career, an isolated figure. Few of his colleagues agreed with him, even those dismayed by the parliamentary vote.

Henson was less isolated in some other causes he took up in the 1920s and 30s. He was one of many wary of the ultra-liberalism of the Modern Churchmen's Union. In 1934 he was among the senior clerics who censured Dean Dwelly of Liverpool for inviting a Unitarian to preach in Liverpool Cathedral and Bishop David for permitting it. (Note: Dwelly's biographer Peter Kennerley considers it ironic that Henson, who moved the motion against David at the Northern Convocation, had ten years earlier preached the sermon at the consecration of Liverpool Cathedral, particularly welcoming the presence of non-Anglicans at the service. Important aspects of Unitarian theology were unacceptable to many mainstream Christians at that time.) He condemned American evangelism as practised by Frank Buchman and the Oxford Group; Henson wrote of Buchman's "oracular despotism" and "the trail of moral and intellectual wrecks which its progress leaves behind." Henson was critical of one of his clergy, Robert Anderson Jardine of Darlington, for conducting the wedding ceremony in France of the Duke of Windsor to a divorcée, Wallis Simpson, contrary to the doctrine of the Church of England. Henson was in a minority of senior clergy in speaking out against the dictators of the Axis powers. He condemned Nazi antisemitism, Mussolini's invasion of Abyssinia, appeasement and the Munich Agreement.

On 1 February 1939, at the age of seventy-five, he retired from Durham to Hintlesham in Suffolk. Seven months later the Second World War began. Henson supported the Allies' fight in what he saw as a just war to defeat godless barbarism; he wrote of "The deepening infamies of Nazi warfare – infamies so horrible as almost to shake one's faith in the essential Divineness of Humanity." He urged, "there can be no compromise or patched-up peace".

=== Last years ===
Winston Churchill was impressed by Henson. Grimley comments that they had much in common, both spending years as isolated figures speaking out for beliefs that were dismissed at the time and later vindicated. After becoming British prime minister in 1940 Churchill persuaded Henson out of retirement to resume his old duties as a canon of Westminster Abbey. Overcoming the strangeness of being back in his old post after nearly thirty years he preached with vigour until cataracts made his eyesight too poor to continue. He retired from the Abbey in 1941. He was offered the masonic position of Provincial Grand Master, but declined it, believing himself too old.

Ella Henson

In his later years Henson's lifelong sense of loneliness was compounded by the growing deafness of his wife, Ella, making their conversation difficult. He found some solace in the friendship of her companion, Fearne Booker, who lived with the Hensons for more than thirty years. (Note: The friendship between Henson and Booker was the basis of a 1987 novel by Susan Howatch, Glittering Images, in which Henson is portrayed as Alex Jardine. In the novel Jardine's friendship with the companion is more than platonic, but Grimley emphasises that Howatch made it clear this was pure fiction, and there was no reason whatever to imagine any impropriety in Henson's relations with Booker.) He occupied a considerable part of his retirement writing his memoirs, published in three volumes under the title Retrospect of an Unimportant Life. Both at the time and subsequently many of his friends and admirers regretted his publishing the work; they thought he had done his reputation a disservice. Despite what Williams calls the "peculiar interest and vivacity" of the books, his survey of his many campaigns and controversies, seemed to others to be self-justifying and wilfully to deny many changes of stance that he had manifestly made during his career. In Williams's view Henson's posthumously-published letters were a better legacy: "delightful in both form and content, and, barbed though they often are, they do him fuller justice".

In his writings Henson referred to his two regrets in life. The first was that he had not been at a public (i.e. fee-charging non-state) school, a fact to which he ascribed his lifelong feeling of being an outsider. (Note: The many senior clergy of his day who had been at Eton, Harrow or other leading public schools included Alington, Davidson, Gore, Strong, Temple and Welldon.) The second regret was that he and his wife had been unable to have children. He wrote in his journal, "If I had been so happy as to have children, I should probably have been a better as well as a happier man." The Hensons unofficially adopted a succession of poor boys and paid for their education. At least one of them became a priest and was ordained by Henson.

Henson died at Hintlesham on 27 September 1947 at the age of eighty-three. At his wish his body was cremated; his ashes were interred in Durham Cathedral. The epitaph on his memorial within the cathedral reads, "He fed them with a faithful and true heart and ruled them prudently with all his power."

=== Reputation ===
Towards the end of his life Henson wrote that his career, "though public, had never been important: that I had been the champion of no cause, the leader of no party, and the darling of no society; that I had written no book which had pleased the 'reading public'; and that, finally, my Journal was as destitute of public interest as of literary merit". A successor as Bishop of Durham, Michael Ramsey, nonetheless considered that Henson's isolation from contemporary fashions had not diminished his influence: "Its secret lay in things far deeper than contemporary fashions: his hold upon the spirit of classical Anglican divinity, his intellectual integrity, and his belief in the power and permanence of that pastoral duty which the Prayer Book lays upon the ministry of the Church". Peart-Binns concludes his biography of Henson:

Paradoxically, in a disestablished Church, Henson would never have been "elected" a bishop. But the Church of England would have been exceedingly the poorer by excluding that extraordinary figure from the stage on which he played such a distinctive role, one which could scarcely be described as "unimportant".

== Works by Henson ==
=== As editor ===
- Church Problems, a View of Modern Anglicanism. London: John Murray. 1900. OCLC 29980088. (Note: Contents: "The Church of England" (Hensley Henson); "Establishment" (Hensley Henson); "Disendowment" (C. A. Whitmore); "The Parochial System" (Edgar Gibson); "Convocation" (W. H. Hutton); "Anglican Theology" (W. O. Burrows); "Anglican Worship" (W. O. Burrows); "Relations with Eastern Churches" (Arthur Headlam); "The Church and Nonconformity" (E. W. Watson); "Education" (H. A. Dalton); "The Bible and Modern Criticism" (Thomas Strong); "The Church and the Empire" (Bernard Wilson); "The Anglican Spirit in Literature" (Henry Beeching); "The Roman Controversy" (W. E. Collins); "Uniformity" (W. E. Collins); "Parties in the Church" (Lord Hugh Cecil).)
- The Naked Truth by Bishop Herbert Croft. London: Chatto & Windus. 1919 [1674]. OCLC 265436413.
- A Memoir of the Right Honourable Sir William Anson. Oxford: Clarendon Press. 1920. OCLC 4065005.

=== As author ===
- Light and Leaven: Historical and Social Sermons to General Congregations. London: Methuen. 1897. OCLC 15070416.
- Apostolic Christianity. London: Methuen. 1898. OCLC 315404297.
- Cui Bono? – An Open Letter to Lord Halifax on the Present Crisis in the Church of England. London: Skeffington. 1899. OCLC 681103530.
- Ad Rem: Thoughts for Critical Times in the Church. London: Wells, Gardner, Darton. 1899. OCLC 17424794.
- Dissent in England: Two Lectures. London: Rivingtons. 1901. OCLC 690683271.
- Godly Union and Concord. London and New York: John Murray and Longmans Green. 1902. OCLC 18727562.
- Cross-Bench Views of Current Church Questions. London: Edward Arnold. 1902. OCLC 1706844.
- Preaching to the Times – in St. Margaret's, Westminster, during the Coronation Year. London: James Clarke. 1902. OCLC 70986753.
- The Education Act and After. London: Methuen. 1903. OCLC 18158455.
- Sincerity and Subscription: A Plea for Toleration in the Church of England. London and Macmillan: Macmillan. 1903. OCLC 475487271. reissued 2010
- Studies in English Religion in the Seventeenth Century; St. Margaret's Lectures, 1903. London: John Murray. 1903. OCLC 22462289.
- The Value of the Bible and other Sermons. London: Macmillan. 1904. OCLC 3373616.
- Notes on Popular Rationalism. London: Isbister. 1904. OCLC 314720933.
- Moral Discipline in the Christian Church. London: Longmans, Green. 1905. OCLC 4364905.
- Religion in the Schools. London: Macmillan. 1906. OCLC 500069112.
- Christian Marriage. London: Cassell. 1907. OCLC 13563563.
- The National Church: Essays on its History and Constitution and Criticisms of its Present Administration. London: Macmillan. 1908. OCLC 951413.
- Christ and the Nation. London: T Fisher Unwin. 1908. OCLC 17351091.
- The Liberty of Prophesying (Lyman Beecher Lectures 1909). London: Macmillan. 1909. OCLC 10121345.
- Westminster Sermons. London: James Clarke. 1910. OCLC 559696043.
- Puritanism in England. London and New York: Hodder and Stoughton. 1912. OCLC 2683311.
- The Creed in the Pulpit. London and New York: Hodder and Stoughton. 1912. OCLC 6833444.
- War-Time Sermons. London: Macmillan. 1915. OCLC 14705642.
- Robertson of Brighton 1816–1853. London: Smith, Elder. 20 May 2024. OCLC 2380202.
- Christian Liberty. London: Macmillan. 1918. OCLC 27672113.
- Anglicanism. London: Macmillan. 1921. OCLC 2909792.
- Byron: the Rede Lecture. Cambridge: Cambridge University Press. 1924. OCLC 2480567.
- In Defence of the English Church. London: Hodder and Stoughton. 1923. OCLC 11586017.
- Quo Tendimus. London: Hodder and Stoughton. 1924. OCLC 20728425.
- Notes on Spiritual Healing. London: Williams and Norgate. 1925. OCLC 2529734.
- Church and Parson in England. London: Hodder and Stoughton. 1927. OCLC 2783802.
- The Book and the Vote. London: Hodder and Stoughton. 1928. OCLC 908598.
- Disestablishment. London: Macmillan. 1929. OCLC 2161447.
- Sibbes and Simeon: An Essay on Patronage Trusts. London: Hodder and Stoughton. 1932. OCLC 41430167.
- The Oxford Groups. London: Oxford University Press. 1933. OCLC 2990780.
- Christian Morality. Oxford: Clarendon Press. 1936. OCLC 1022377.
- Ad Clerum. London: Hodder and Stoughton. 1937. OCLC 1350595.
- The Church of England. Cambridge: Cambridge University Press. 1939. OCLC 391952.
- Last Words in Westminster Abbey. London: Hodder and Stoughton. 1941. OCLC 6776261.
- Retrospect of an Unimportant Life, Volume 1, 1863–1920. London: Oxford University Press. 1942. OCLC 504487861.
- Retrospect of an Unimportant Life, Volume 2, 1920–1939. London: Oxford University Press. 1943. OCLC 504487878.
- Bishoprick Papers. London and New York: Oxford University Press. 1946. OCLC 2783813.
- Retrospect of an Unimportant Life, Volume 3, 1939–1946. London: Oxford University Press. 1950. OCLC 772945481.
- Braley, Evelyn Foley, ed. (1951). Letters of Herbert Hensley Henson. London: SPCK. OCLC 271598098.

== Notes, references and sources ==
=== Sources ===
- Barber, Melanie (1999). "Randall Davidson: A Partial Retrospective". In Stephen Taylor (ed.). From Cranmer to Davidson: A Church of England Miscellany. Woodbridge: Boydell. ISBN 978-0-85115-742-9.
- Barclay, William (1998). The Apostles' Creed. London: Presbyterian Publishing Corporation. ISBN 978-0-664-25826-9.
- Bartley, Paula (2014). Ellen Wilkinson: From Red Suffragist to Government Minister. London: Pluto Press. ISBN 978-0-7453-3237-6.
- Begbie, Harold (1922). Painted Windows; Studies in Religious Personality. New York and London: Putnam. OCLC 720803.
- Bell, George (1935). Randall Davidson: Archbishop of Canterbury, Volume II. London: Oxford University Press. OCLC 896112401.
- Chadwick, Owen (1983). Hensley Henson: A Study in the Friction between Church and State. Oxford: Clarendon Press. ISBN 978-0-19-826445-3.
- Garbett, Cyril (1947). The Claims of the Church of England. London: Hodder and Stoughton. OCLC 1209695.
- Henson, Hensley (1900). Church Problems, a View of Modern Anglicanism. London: John Murray. OCLC 1041811776.
- Henson, Hensley (1942). Retrospect of an Unimportant Life, Volume 1, 1863–1920. London: Oxford University Press. OCLC 504487861.
- Henson, Hensley (1943). Retrospect of an Unimportant Life, Volume 2, 1920–1939. London: Oxford University Press. OCLC 504487878.
- Henson, Hensley (1950). Retrospect of an Unimportant Life, Volume 3, 1939–1946. London: Oxford University Press. OCLC 772945481.
- Henson, Hensley (1951). Evelyn Foley Braley (ed.). Letters of Herbert Hensley Henson. London: SPCK. OCLC 271598098.
- Kennerley, Peter (2004). Frederick William Dwelly, First Dean of Liverpool, 1881–1957. Lancaster: Carnegie House. ISBN 978-1-85936-133-7.
- Lockhart, J. G. (1949). Cosmo Gordon Lang. London: Hodder and Stoughton. OCLC 739641.
- Lyttelton, G. W.; Rupert Hart-Davis (1981). The Lyttelton–Hart-Davis Letters, Volume Three. London: John Murray. ISBN 978-0-7195-3770-7.
- Peart-Binns, John Stuart (2013). Herbert Hensley Henson – A Biography. Cambridge: Lutterworth Press. ISBN 978-0-7188-9302-6.
- Piggott, Jan; Graham Able; Allan Ronald; Terry Walsh (2008). Dulwich College – A History, 1616–2008. London: Dulwich College. ISBN 978-0-9539493-2-8.
- Ramsey, Michael (1937). "Preface". Ad Clerum. London: Hodder and Stoughton. OCLC 1350595.
- Spinks, Bryan (2006). "The Prayer Book 'Crisis'". In Hefling, Charles; Cynthia L. Shattuck (eds.). The Oxford Guide to the Book of Common Prayer: A Worldwide Survey. Oxford: Oxford University Press. ISBN 978-0-19-529756-0.
- Straw, Jack (2007). The Governance of Britain. London: Her Majesty's Stationery Office. ISBN 978-0-10-171702-1.
- Vincent, W. D. F.; A. J. Tonkin (1930). The Cutter's Practical Guide to Cutting and Making of All Kinds of Clerical Dress. London: John Williamson. OCLC 973655743.
- Whitaker, Cuthbert, ed. (1999) [1899]. Almanack, 1900. London: J. Whitaker and Sons. ISBN 978-0-11-702247-8.

Church of England titles
Preceded by George Kitchin	Dean of Durham; 1912–1918	Succeeded by James Welldon
Preceded by John Percival	Bishop of Hereford; 1917–1920	Succeeded by Linton Smith
Preceded by Handley Moule	Bishop of Durham; 1920–1939	Succeeded by Alwyn Williams
Professional and academic associations
Preceded by Henry Gee	President of the Surtees Society; 1939–1945	Succeeded by Alwyn Williams
