= Edward Maclure =

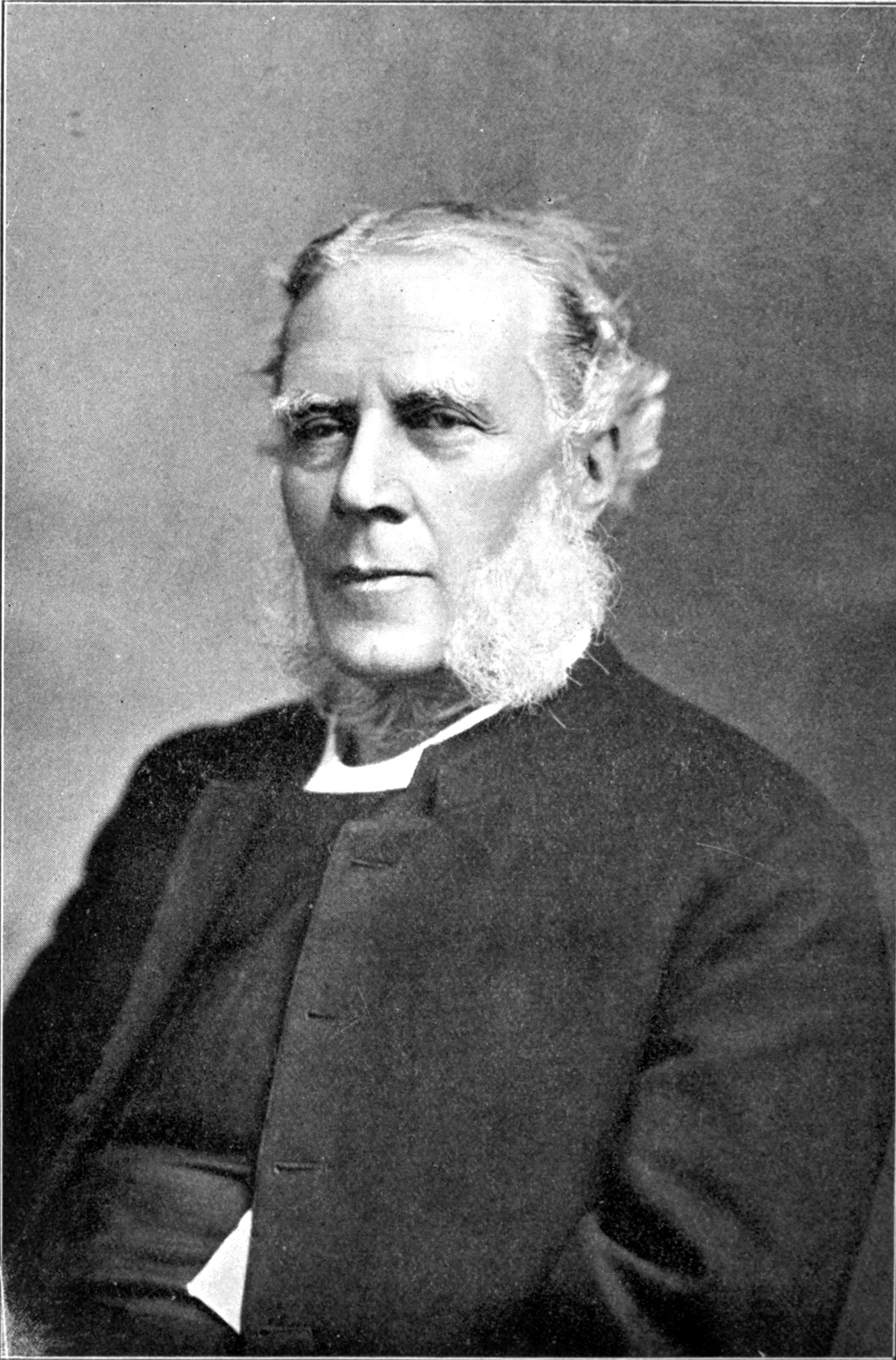
Edward Craig Maclure Dean of Manchester

Edward Craig Maclure (1833–1906) was Dean of Manchester in the last decade of the 19th century and the first one of the 20th.

== Career ==
Born on 10 June 1833 he was educated at Manchester Grammar School and Brasenose College, Oxford and ordained in 1858. After curacies at St John Ladywood and St Pancras Parish Church he was Vicar of Habergham Eaves then Rural Dean of Rochdale. Whilst still Archdeacon-designate of Manchester he was elevated to that the Deanery.

He received the honorary degree Doctor of Laws (LL.D.) from the Victoria University of Manchester in February 1902, in connection with the 50th jubilee celebrations of the establishment of the university.

== Personal life ==
He died in post on 8 May 1906.

His brother, Sir John Maclure, 1st Baronet was Member of Parliament for Stretford from 1886 to 1901.

== Notes ==
Church of England titles
Preceded by John Oakley	Dean of Manchester; 1890 – 1906	Succeeded by James Edward Cowell Welldon
