= Robert Waddington (priest) =

The Very Reverend Robert Waddington OGS
- Dean of Manchester
- Church: Church of England
- Province: Province of York
- Diocese: Diocese of Manchester
- In office: 1984 to 1993
- Predecessor: Alfred Jowett
- Successor: Ken Riley

Orders
- Ordination: 1954

Personal details
- Born: Robert Murray Waddington; 24 October 1927 Bognor Regis
- Died: 15 March 2007 (aged 79) Bognor Regis
- Denomination: Anglicanism
- Education: Dulwich College
- Alma mater: Selwyn College, Cambridge; Ely Theological College

Robert Murray Waddington, OGS (24 October 1927 – 15 March 2007) was a British Anglican priest. He was the dean of Manchester in the Church of England from 1984 to 1993. He additionally served as superior of the Oratory of the Good Shepherd (a dispersed community of Anglicans) from 1987 until 1990.

External image
- Robert Waddington from his obituary at The Whitehaven News

== Early life and education ==
Born in Bognor Regis on 24 October 1927, he was educated at Dulwich College, Selwyn College, Cambridge, and Ely Theological College.

== Ordained ministry ==
Ordained in 1954, he began his career at St John's, Bethnal Green. Afterwards he was chaplain at Slade School in Warwick, Queensland. He returned to England in 1959 to join the Oratory of the Good Shepherd, an order of celibate priests. After 18 months, he returned to Australia to become headmaster of St Barnabas School, Ravenshoe, where he remained nine years.

Returning to England in 1971, he was at Oxford University's department of education before becoming a canon residentiary at Carlisle Cathedral and bishop's adviser for education then general secretary of the National Society until his appointment as dean. He was superior of the Oratory of the Good Shepherd from 1987 until 1990.

On 15 March 2007, Waddington died in Bognor Regis, West Sussex, England. He had been suffering from throat cancer.

== Child abuse ==
In January 1999, a former pupil of St Barnabas School, Ravenshoe, Australia, (where Waddington had been headmaster) contacted the Bishop of North Queensland. He reported that he has been abused by Waddington in the 1960s and wanted reassurance from the bishop that it would not be allowed to happen again. In September 2003, it was reported to the Diocese of Manchester that a boy had been abused by Waddington when he was aged 11, 12 and 13, and was a chorister at Manchester Cathedral.

In April 2013, it was revealed by the press that allegations of child sexual abuse had been previously made against Waddington (in 1999 and in 2003). This had resulted in his right to officiate at services being removed by the then archbishop of York, David Hope, Baron Hope of Thornes. However, he was not reported to the police; Hope had cited his "[concern] about Waddington's state of health" as the reason for not doing so.

One of Waddington's reported victims spoke to The Times in May 2013, described how he was groomed by Waddington while he was a choir boy at Manchester Cathedral in the 1980s. The sexual abuse started when he was 13 and continued until he moved away to university. He had reported the abuse to the police in October 2012.

David Hope among others was censured for failing to act when complaints were made which put other children at risk. Bishop David Walker praised the current archbishop of York, John Sentamu, for starting an enquiry. Walker also praised the courage of those who spoke out about abuse and said:

Every time a survivor of abuse speaks out it makes it just a little easier for the next person to speak. Thank you for the courage you have found.

== See also ==
- Anglican Church sexual abuse cases

Church of England titles
Preceded by Alfred Jowett	Dean of Manchester; 1984–1993	Succeeded by Kenneth Joseph Riley
