= Ken Riley (priest) =

British priest (1940–2025)

The Very Reverend Ken Riley OBE
- Church: Church of England
- Diocese: Dean of Manchester
- In office: 1993–2005
- Predecessor: Robert Waddington
- Successor: Rogers Govender

Orders
- Ordination: 1964 (deacon); 1965 (priest)

Personal details
- Born: Kenneth Joseph Riley; 25 June 1940
- Died: 19 October 2025 (aged 85)
- Denomination: Anglicanism

Kenneth Joseph Riley, OBE (25 June 1940 – 19 October 2025) was an English Anglican clergyman who was the Dean of Manchester from 1993 to 2005.

== Early life and education ==
Riley was born on 25 June 1940 in Flint, Flintshire, Wales. He was educated at Holywell Grammar School in Holywell, Flintshire. He studied music at Aberystwyth University, graduating with a Bachelor of Arts (BA) degree in 1961. He then matriculated in to Wycliffe Hall, Oxford to train for ordination. He also studied theology at Linacre College, Oxford, graduating with a further BA in 1964.

== Ordained ministry ==
Riley was ordained in the Church of England as a deacon in 1964 and as a priest in 1964. He began his ministry as a curate at Emmanuel Church, Fazakerley. After this he was chaplain at Brasted Place College, then Oundle School and finally Liverpool University. From 1987 to 1993 he was precentor at Liverpool Cathedral when he was elevated to the deanery in Dean of Manchester. In the 2003 New Year Honours, he was appointed an Officer of the Order of the British Empire (OBE) "for services to the community in Manchester". He retired in 2005, and made Dean Emeritus.

== Personal life and death ==
In 1968, Riley married Margaret. Together they had two daughters.

Riley died on 19 October 2025, aged 85.

Church of England titles
| Preceded by Robert Murray Waddington | Dean of Manchester; 1993 – 2005 | Succeeded by Rogers Morgan Govender |
