= George Bowers (priest) =

George Hull Bowers (bapt. 30 March 1794 – 27 December 1872) was an Anglican priest who was Dean of Manchester from 1847 to 1871, and founder of Marlborough College in Wiltshire.

Born in Staffordshire, he was educated at Clare College, Cambridge, and ordained in 1819. He began his ecclesiastical career at Elstow in Bedfordshire, after which he was Rector of St Paul's, Covent Garden, followed by a 25-year spell in Manchester.

== Notes ==
Church of England titles
Preceded by William Herbert	Dean of Manchester; 1847 – 1872	Succeeded by Benjamin Morgan Cowie
