= Benjamin Cowie =

British clergyman and Dean of Exeter (1816–1900)

The Very Reverend Benjamin Cowie

Dean of Exeter
- In office 1883–1900

Dean of Manchester
- In office 1872–1883

Benjamin Morgan Cowie was Dean of Manchester and then Exeter, both in England, in the last quarter of the 19th century.

Born on 8 June 1816, he was educated at St John's College, Cambridge and graduated Senior Wrangler in 1839. Ordained in 1841 he was successively Tutor, Lecturer and Fellow at his old college. Afterwards he was Vicar of St Lawrence Jewry followed by an 11-year spell in Manchester, followed by a further 17 at Exeter. He died on 3 May 1900.

== Notes ==
Church of England titles
Preceded by George Hull Bowers	Dean of Manchester; 1872 – 1883	Succeeded by John Oakley
Preceded by Archibald Boyd	Dean of Exeter; 1883 – 1900	Succeeded by Alfred Earle
