= John Oakley (priest) =

John Oakley (28 October 1834 – 10 June 1890) was Dean of Carlisle and then Manchester in the last quarter of the 19th century.

Born in Frindsbury, Kent, Oakley was educated at Brasenose College, Oxford and ordained in 1858. After curacies at St Luke’s, Berwick Street, and St James, Piccadilly, London, he was then Vicar of St Saviour’s, Hoxton followed by a short spell in Carlisle as Dean of the cathedral followed by a further six years at Manchester, also as dean.

== Works ==
- "The Conscience Clause": its history . London: William Ridgway. 1866.

Church of England titles
Preceded by Francis Close	Dean of Carlisle; 1882 – 1884	Succeeded by William George Henderson
Preceded by Benjamin Morgan Cowie	Dean of Manchester; 1884 – 1890	Succeeded by Edward Craig Maclure
