= James Welldon =

English clergyman and scholar (1854–1937)

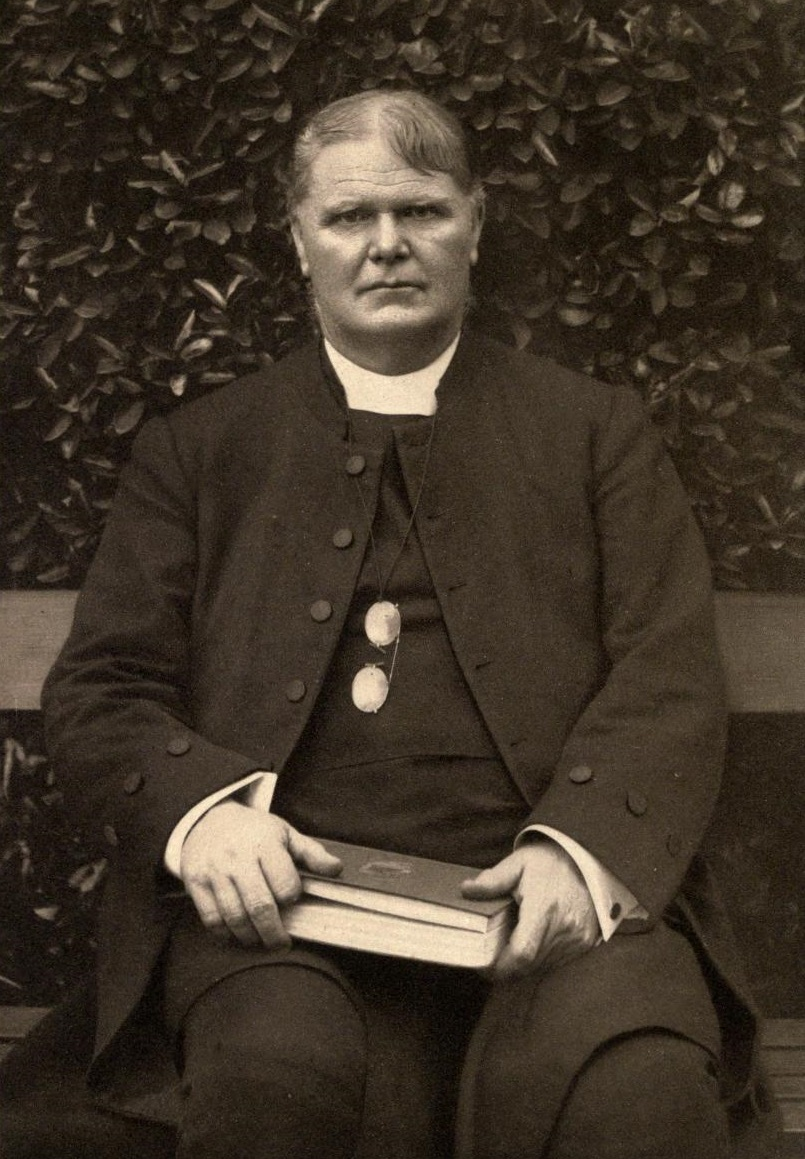
J.E.C. Welldon.

James Edward Cowell Welldon (25 April 1854 – 17 June 1937) was an English clergyman and scholar. He was Bishop of Calcutta from 1898 to 1902, Dean of Manchester from 1906 to 1918, and Dean of Durham from 1918 to 1933.

== Early life ==
Welldon was born in 1854 in Tonbridge, Kent, the son of Edward Ind Welldon, the Second Master of Tonbridge School, and nephew of James Ind Welldon, Headmaster of Tonbridge. He was educated at Eton and was named the Newcastle scholar in 1873. He went on to King's College, Cambridge where he was academically prominent, becoming the Bell scholar in 1874 and the Browne's medallist in 1875 and 1876. In 1877, as well as gaining his BA degree, he was the senior classical and senior chancellor's medallist. He became a fellow in 1878 and in 1880 gained his MA degree.

== Sporting achievements ==
He had a reputation at Eton in both the college's Wall Game and Field Game and became school captain. After school, he played as full-back in association football with the Old Etonians F.C. and took part in the first match (score 1–1 draw) of the 1876 FA Cup Final at Kennington Oval, which they ultimately lost after a replay to Wanderers when his place in team was taken by Edgar Lubbock. He also played for Upton Park and Hertfordshire Rangers and in representative matches for Essex and London.

== Career ==
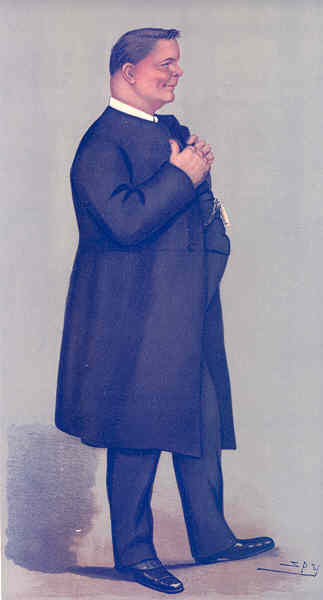
Welldon as caricatured by Spy (Leslie Ward) in Vanity Fair, November 1898.

In May 1883, Welldon was appointed master of Dulwich College. In the short time he held this position he did much for the college, including the creation and institution of its school song Pueri Alleynienses which is still in use today. He resigned in July 1885 to take up the position of headmaster of Harrow School, which he held from 1885 to 1898. He was disliked by many of the masters as an autocratic administrator, but was more popular with the boys, by whom he was known as "the Porker."

While at Harrow he also accepted a number of clerical positions, having been ordained as a deacon in 1883 and as a priest in 1885, including the select preacher before Cambridge University (in 1885, 1888, and 1893) and the select preacher before the University of Oxford in 1886 and 1887. He was honorary chaplain to Queen Victoria from 1888 to 1892, and Chaplain in Ordinary from 1892 to 1898. He was the Hulsean Lecturer at Cambridge in 1897. In 1898, he became a Doctor of Divinity.

After leaving Harrow, Welldon was appointed Bishop of Calcutta in 1898. As bishop, then metropolitan of Calcutta, he excluded Scottish chaplains and troops from the use of garrison churches in India because they had not received episcopal consecration, an action for which he was criticised by Robert Herbert Story. He remained diocesan until early 1902 when he resigned owing to ill health and disagreement with the Viceroy, Lord Curzon. He returned to England to become a canon of Westminster, and was installed as such on 8 March 1902. He served in Westminster until 1906. In late 1902 he visited South Africa. From 1906 to 1918 he was Dean of Manchester and from 1918 of Durham. He had a strained relationship with the Bishop of Durham, Hensley Henson, who described him as "a man who could neither speak with effect nor be silent with dignity".

== Private life ==
Welldon became an Officer d'académie in 1898. He was a member of the Athenaeum, a senior Freemason (Past Grand Chaplain), and a keen proponent of British imperialism. He was a lifelong bachelor, and for nearly fifty years had the close companionship of a manservant, Edward Hudson Perkins, from whose death in 1932 Welldon never recovered. Welldon died at Sevenoaks, Kent, on 17 June 1937 aged eighty-three.

== E.M Forster's poem ==
E.M. Forster wrote a satirical poem regarding Bishop Welldon after the bishop criticised Labour M.Ps for 'vulgar profanity':

My brethren, nothing on earth is finer
Than a truly refined inarticulate miner
(Or may we say 'under the earth,' for there
Is a miner's place, not up in the air?);
But he must be refined, he must be meek,
Expert at his job, yet unable to speak,
He must not complain or use swear words or spit;
Much is expected of men in the pit.

It is different for me. I have earned the right,
Through position and birth to be impolite.
I have always been used to the best of things,
I was nourished at Eton and crowned at King's,
I pushed to the front in religion and play,
I shoved all competitors out of the way;
I ruled at Harrow, I went to Calcutta,
I buttered my bread and jammed my butter,
And returned as a bishop, enormous of port,
Who stood in a pulpit and said what he thought.
Yes, I said what I thought and thought what I said,
They hadn't got butter, they hadn't got bread,
They hadn't got jam or tobacco or tea,
They hadn't a friend, but they always had me.
And I'm different to them. I needn't be meek,
Because I have learned the proper technique;
Because I'm a scholar, a don, and a dean,
It's all in good taste when I'm vulgar or mean.

I can bully or patronize, just which I please;
I am different to them.... But those Labour M.P.s,
How dare they be rude? They ought to have waited
Until they were properly educated.
They must be punished, they've got to be stopped,
Parliamentary privilege ought to be dropped.
They shall be scourged and buried alive
If they trespass on My prerogative.

May I most clearly state, ere I lay down my pen,
That rudeness is only for gentlemen?
As it was in the beginning, it shall be ... Amen !

== Publications ==
Welldon was the author of a number of works including:

- Translation of Aristotle's Politics (1883).
- Translation of Rhetoric (1886).
- Translation of Ethics (1892).
- Gerald Eversley's Friendship (1895).
- The Hope of Immortality (1898).
- Harvest Home: A Sheaf of Sermons (1900).
- Patriotic Song (1901).
- The Consecration of the State (1902).
- The Revelation of the Holy Spirit (1902).
- Recollections and Reflections (1915).
- Religion and Reconstruction (1918).
- The Greek Orthodox Church. By Rev. Constantine Callinicos, Preface by the Right Rev. J.E.C. Welldon, 1918.
- The Nature of Immortality in Life After Death According to Christianity and Spiritualism. Sir James Marchant, Ed. (1925).
- The English Church (1926).
- The Church and the World (1932).
- Forty Years On (1935)

== Notes ==
Academic offices
Preceded by Alfred James Carver	Master of Dulwich College; 1883–1885	Succeeded by Arthur Herman Gilkes
Preceded by Rev. Dr. Henry Montagu Butler	Headmaster of Harrow School; 1885–1898	Succeeded by Dr. Joseph Wood
Church of England titles
Preceded by Edward Ralph Johnson	Bishop of Calcutta; 1898–1902	Succeeded by Reginald Stephen Copleston
Preceded by Edward Craig Maclure	Dean of Manchester Cathedral; 1906–1918	Succeeded by William Shuckburgh Swayne
Preceded by Herbert Hensley Henson	Dean of Durham Cathedral; 1918–1933	Succeeded by Cyril Alington
