= Edward Hicks (bishop) =

British Anglican bishop (1843–1919)

The Right Reverend Edward Hicks
- Bishop of Lincoln
- Hicks, c. 1916
- Diocese: Diocese of Lincoln
- In office: 1910–1919
- Predecessor: Edward King
- Successor: William Swayne

Orders
- Ordination: 1886

Personal details
- Born: 23 December 1843 Oxford, England
- Died: 14 August 1919 (aged 75) Worthing, Sussex, England
- Education: Brasenose College, Oxford

Edward Lee Hicks (23 December 1843 – 14 August 1919) was an eminent Anglican priest and author who served as Bishop of Lincoln 1910–1919.

== Life and works ==
Born in Oxford in 1843, Hicks was educated at Magdalen College School and Brasenose College, Oxford and ordained in 1886. After a spell as Fellow and Tutor at Corpus Christi College, Oxford he was Rector of Fenny Compton before becoming Warden of Hulme Hall in 1886. After this he was a canon residentiary of Manchester Cathedral, then Rural Dean of Salford until his elevation to the episcopate. He had not been supported by the Archbishop of Canterbury for the post. "I do not think Hicks would do for Lincoln .... " The Archbishop regarded Hicks as a "faddist" who threw "himself eagerly not to say fanatically into any cause which he espouses". But at that time Prime Minister H. H. Asquith was the key figure in episcopal appointments and, influenced by Hicks as a "strong Liberal in politics", recommended him to the Crown for the post at Lincoln.

During the First World War, unlike other bishops, Hicks did not encourage recruitment to the Forces nor did he condemn Germany. He was peace-loving, and had promoted "an honourable neutrality of Great Britain". He was accused of cowardice, and produced a strong reply to his critics showing prescience of what the "Great War" would involve. "Anyone who knows what war means - its stoppage of industry, its heaping up of debt and taxation, its unemployment, its famine, its missing at home, its paralysis of all effective work and expenditure on Social Reform, not to mention the horrible carnage of the battlefield, the agonies of the wounded, the visitations of disease and pestilence that always follow campaigns and battles - will be the last to tax me with cowardice if I confess to a loathing of war." During that War, he lost a son, Edwin, in 1917 and gave up part and eventually the whole of his palace, first for the use of Belgian refugees and then to the Red Cross. Novelist and biographer Penelope Fitzgerald was his granddaughter.

== Classical scholar and epigraphist ==
After university, Hicks was also much in demand as a classical scholar and epigraphist, contributing to numerous articles and publications, including:

Hicks, E.L. et al., The Collection of Ancient Greek Inscriptions in the British Museum, Printed by order of the Trustees of The British Museum, 1874; Hicks, E.L. et al., Illahun, Kahun and Gurob, 1888-1890, D. Nutt, 1891; Hicks, E.L. and W.R. Paton, The inscriptions of Cos, Clarendon Press, 1891; Hicks, E.L. and G.F. Hill, A Manual of Greek Historical Inscriptions, Clarendon Press, 1882.

Church of England titles
Preceded by Edward King	Bishop of Lincoln; 1910–1919	Succeeded by William Swayne
