= Rogers Govender =

Dean of Manchester Cathedral (born 1960)

The Very Reverend Rogers Govender MBE
- Dean of Manchester
- Church: Church of England
- Province: York
- Diocese: Manchester
- In office: 2006–present
- Predecessor: Ken Riley

Orders
- Ordination: 1985 (deacon); 1986 (priest)

Personal details
- Born: Rogers Morgan Govender; 29 June 1960 (age 66) Durban, Province of Natal, South Africa
- Education: St Paul's College, Grahamstown; University of Natal

Rogers Morgan Govender MBE (born 29 June 1960) is a South African Anglican priest. Since 2006, he has been Dean of Manchester.

== Early life ==
Govender was born on 29 June 1960 in Durban, Province of Natal, South Africa. He is a sixth generation South African of South Indian ancestry. In 1983, he entered St Paul's College, Grahamstown, an Anglican theological college, to train for ministry in the Church of the Province of Southern Africa.

== Ordained ministry ==
Govender was ordained deacon in 1985 and priest in 1986. He was priest in charge at St Mary's Church, Greyville, Durban from 1988 until 1993 when he was transferred to St Matthew's Hayfields, Pietermaritzburg where he was rector and subsequently St Thomas's Musgrave Road. He graduated from the University of Natal with a Bachelor of Theology (BTh) degree in 1997. He emigrated to the United Kingdom in 2002 after 15 years of service in the Diocese of Natal.

On arrival in England, he was priest-in-charge of Christ Church, West Didsbury in South Manchester and Area Dean of Withington. In 2006 he was appointed Dean of Manchester. The Dean is based in Manchester, England and is the head of the Chapter of Manchester Cathedral. At the time of his appointment was England's first black cathedral dean, and the third most senior black or Asian churchman in the Church of England. His aim is to accommodate people of all races in the inner city.

He serves on the executive board of the Association of English Cathedrals.

Govender filled in for Tom Hanks in a spoofed Da Vinci Code movie poster in 2006, to promote a "Da Vinci Code Mass" at the cathedral intended to address issues raised by the controversial book, and the movie based on it. The mass was inspired by a poll revealing that the book and movie may have undermined public trust in the Catholic Church.

== Personal life ==
Govender is married to Celia. They have two children, Jonathan and Claire.

== Honours ==
In 2018 Govender was awarded an MBE for his services to interfaith relations and to the community in Manchester.

== See also ==
- Controversy over the use of Manchester Cathedral in Resistance: Fall of Man
