= Alfred Jowett =

Dean of Manchester

Alfred Jowett CBE

Dean of Manchester
- In office 1964–1983

Alfred Jowett CBE was Dean of Manchester in the last third of the 20th Century. Born on 29 May 1914, educated at High Storrs and St Catharine's College, Cambridge and ordained in 1945, he began his career at St John the Evangelist, Goole. Afterwards he was Secretary to the Sheffield Anglican and Free Church Council and Marriage Guidance Council then Vicar of St George with St Stephen, in his home city. Between 1960 and 1964 he was Vicar of Doncaster when he was elevated to the Deanery, serving 19 years. An honorary graduate of the University of Sheffield, he died on 28 July 2004.

== Notes ==
Church of England titles
Preceded by Herbert Arthur Jones	Dean of Manchester; 1964–1983	Succeeded by Robert Murray Waddington
