= William Swayne =

English Anglican bishop (1862–1941)

William Shuckburgh Swayne (1924)

William Shuckburgh Swayne (1862–1941) was a Church of England bishop and author who served as Dean of Manchester then Bishop of Lincoln in the first half of the 20th century.

Born in 1862 he was educated at New College, Oxford and ordained in 1886. He began his ecclesiastical career with curacies at Lyndhurst and Stalbridge and was then Diocesan Lecturer for Lichfield. After this he held incumbencies at St Matthew's Church, Walsall and then St Peter's, Cranley Gardens, a post he held until his consecration to the episcopate. He died on 30 June 1941.

Church of England titles
Preceded by James Edward Cowell Welldon	Dean of Manchester; 1918–1920	Succeeded by Hewlett Johnson
Preceded by Edward Lee Hicks	Bishop of Lincoln; 1920–1932	Succeeded by Frederick Cyril Nugent Hicks
