= Dean of Manchester =

Church of England senior clergy member

The Dean of Manchester is based in Manchester, England, and is the head of the Chapter of Manchester Cathedral. Originally entitled the Warden of Christ's College when the Anglican Diocese of Manchester was created in 1840, the position was re-named the Dean in 1846.

The current dean is Rogers Govender.

== List of deans ==
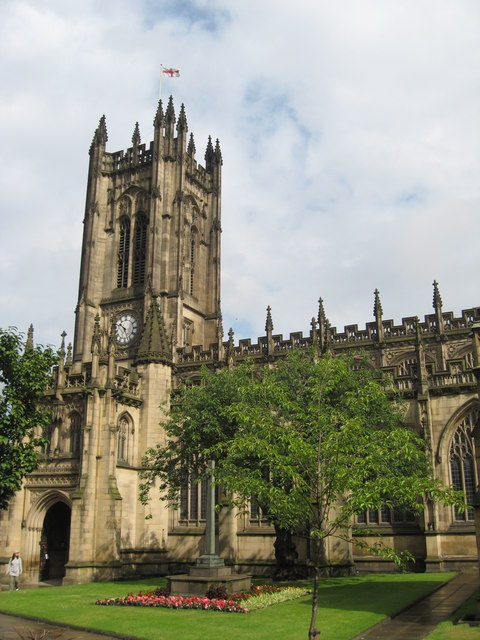
Manchester cathedral

- 1840–1847 William Herbert
- 1847–1872 George Bowers
- 1872–1883 Benjamin Cowie (afterwards Dean of Exeter, 1883)
- 1884–1890 John Oakley
- 1890–1906 Edward Maclure
- 1906–1918 James Welldon
- 1918–1920 William Swayne (afterwards Bishop of Lincoln, 1920)
- 1920–1924 Gough McCormick
- 1924–1931 Hewlett Johnson (afterwards Dean of Canterbury, 1931)
- 1931–1948 Garfield Williams
- 1949–1953 Leonard Wilson (afterwards Bishop of Birmingham, 1953)
- 1954–1963 Herbert Jones
- 1964–1983 Alfred Jowett
- 1984–1993 Robert Waddington
- 1993–2005 Ken Riley
- 2005–present Rogers Govender
