= Francis Close =

Anglican rector

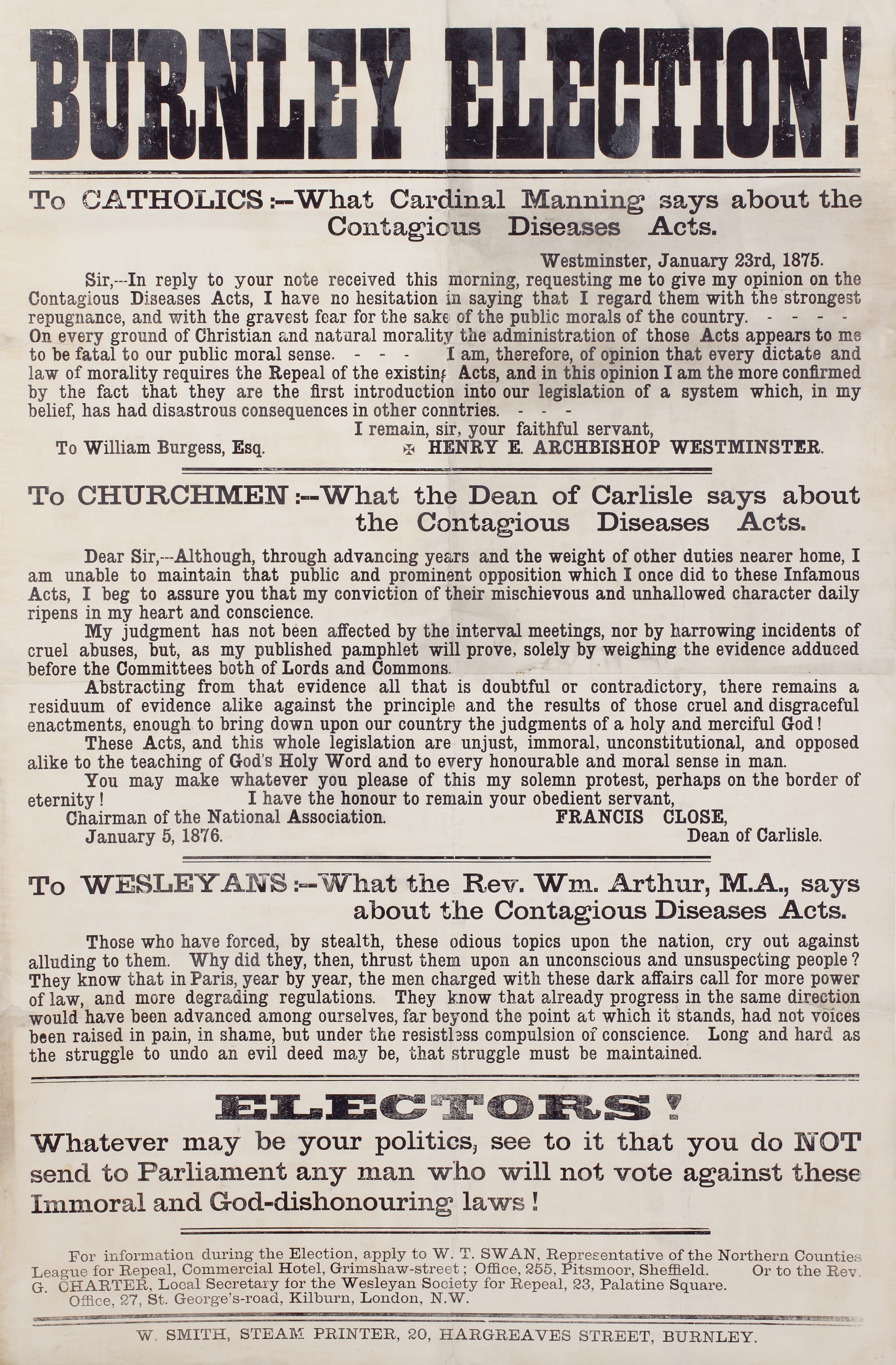
Poster printed during the 1876 Burnley by-election campaign, quoting Close calling for the repeal of the Contagious Diseases Acts.

Francis Close (11 July 1797 – 18 December 1882) was the Anglican rector of Cheltenham (1826–1856) and Dean of Carlisle (1856–1881).

== Biography ==
Close was born on 11 July 1797 in Frome, Somerset, the youngest son of the Rev. Henry Jackson Close, who was at one time Rector of Bentworth, near Alton, in Hampshire. Enrolling at St. John's College, Cambridge, in 1816, he earned a Bachelor of Arts in 1820 and was elevated to MA in 1825. During the same time period, he was ordained a deacon in 1820 and a priest the following year. In 1822, he was assigned as curate of Willesden and Kingsbury in the London area. Two years later, in 1824, he was assigned to Cheltenham and the parish church of St Mary's, and when the rector died in 1826, he was elevated to that office.

Close served as rector for thirty years, where he was a popular preacher and a noted evangelical. He was a vociferous opponent of the Oxford Movement. He advocated for the creation of a training college for schoolteachers and opposed alcohol, tobacco, horse racing, and theatrical amusements. He was involved in the provision of new churches in Cheltenham. On 24 November 1856, he was nominated to be Dean of Carlisle Cathedral by the Prime Minister, Lord Palmerston, and the appointment was approved by the Queen. That same year, the Archbishop of Canterbury conferred a Lambeth Doctorate of Divinity upon Close. He remained as Dean of Carlisle until 1881, when failing health forced him to resign. At the time of his resignation, he was the oldest of all deans in the Church of England He died in Penzance the following year, on 12 December 1882, and was buried in Carlisle Cathedral.

== Personal life ==
Close married twice: in 1820, he married Anne Diana Arden, and in 1880, he married Mary Antrim.

== Legacy ==
Close was the author of around seventy books and pamphlets, though by 1887 few were considered "of any permanent value." In 1885, a marble statue of Close was installed in Carlisle Cathedral after a public collection of funds for the purpose. Dean Close School and Francis Close Hall, both in Cheltenham, were named in his honour.

== Sources ==
- Munden, A. F. "Close, Francis". Oxford Dictionary of National Biography (online ed.). Oxford University Press. doi:10.1093/ref:odnb/5703. (Subscription, Wikipedia Library access or UK public library membership required.)

Church of England titles
Preceded by Archibald Campbell Tait	Dean of Carlisle; 1856–1881	Succeeded by John Oakley
