= Hewlett Johnson =

English priest of the Church of England and Christian communist (1874–1966)

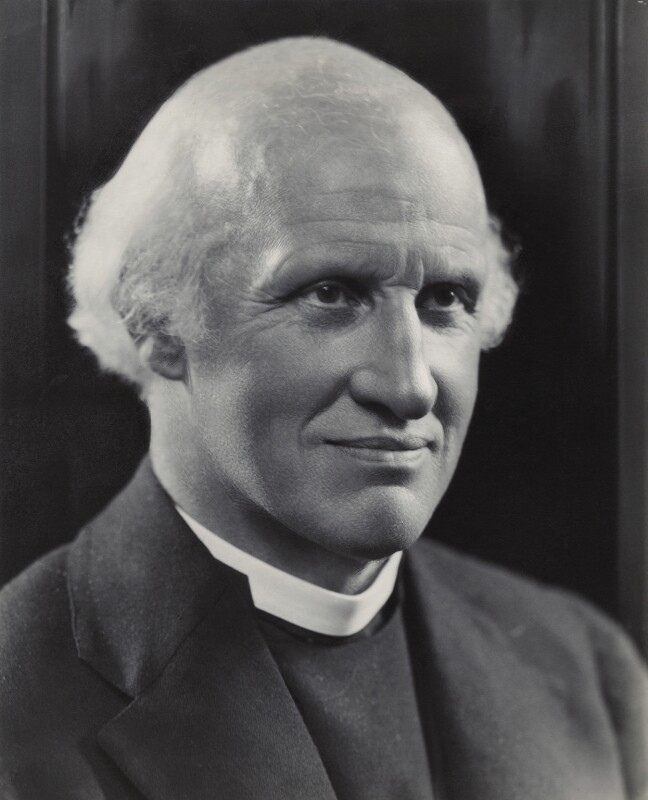
- Johnson in 1938
- Born: 25 January 1874; Manchester, United Kingdom
- Died: 22 October 1966 (aged 92); Canterbury, United Kingdom
- Occupation: Dean
- Awards: Order of the Red Banner of Labour; Stalin Peace Prize

Education
- Education: Owens College, Manchester; Wycliffe Hall, Oxford; Wadham College, Oxford

Philosophical work
- Notable works: Socialist Sixth of the world, Marxism and the individual, Christians and Communism
- Notable ideas: Christian communism

Hewlett Johnson (25 January 1874 – 22 October 1966) was an English Anglican priest of the Church of England and a Christian communist and Marxist-Leninist activist and author. He was Dean of Manchester and later Dean of Canterbury, where he acquired his nickname "The Red Dean of Canterbury" for his unyielding support towards Joseph Stalin and the Soviet Union and its allies.

== Early life ==
Johnson was born in Kersal as the third son of Charles Johnson, a wire manufacturer, and his wife Rosa, daughter of the Reverend Alfred Hewlett. He was educated at The King's School, Macclesfield and graduated from Owens College, Manchester, in 1894 with a Bachelor of Sciences degree in civil engineering and the geological prize.

He worked from 1895 to 1898 at the railway carriage works in Openshaw, Manchester, where two workmates introduced him to socialism, and he became an associate member of the Institution of Civil Engineers. After deciding to do mission work for the Church Mission Society, he entered Wycliffe Hall, Oxford, in 1900 and later attended Wadham College, Oxford, where he gained a second in theology in 1904. The society rejected him because of his increasingly radical theological views, so he concentrated on training for priesthood and was ordained that same year.

He became curate in 1905 and in 1908 a vicar of St Margaret's Altrincham. He and his first wife organised holiday camps for poor children and a hospital for returning World War I wounded soldiers in the town. His unconventional views on the war caused him to be refused employment as an army chaplain on active service but he officiated at a prisoner-of-war camp in his parish. He became an honorary canon of Chester Cathedral in 1919 and rural dean of Bowdon, Greater Manchester, in which area his parish lay, in 1923.

An avowed Christian Marxist, Johnson was brought under surveillance by MI5 in 1917 when he spoke in Manchester in support of the October Revolution. Although he never joined the Communist Party of Great Britain, he became chairman of the board of its newspaper, The Daily Worker. His political views were unpopular but his hard work and pastoral skills led to him being appointed Dean of Manchester by Labour Party founder and then-prime minister Ramsay MacDonald in 1924. He was appointed Dean of Canterbury in 1931.

== The Socialist Sixth of the World ==
Johnson came to public prominence in the 1930s when he contrasted the economic development of the Soviet Union under the First Five Year Plan with Britain during the Great Depression. He toured the Soviet Union in 1934 and again in 1937, claiming on each occasion the health and wealth of the average Soviet citizen and that the Soviet system protected the citizens' liberties. He collected his articles in the book The Socialist Sixth of the World (Gollancz, 1939; published in the United States as Soviet Power in 1941), which included a preface by the renegade Brazilian Roman Catholic bishop Carlos Duarte Costa.

Johnson defended his positive accounts of life in the Soviet Union, emphasising that he had visited "five Soviet Republics and several great Soviet towns", that he had wandered on foot "many long hours on many occasions and entirely alone" and that he saw "all parts of the various towns and villages and at all hours of day and night". It later emerged that much of the book was copied word for word from pro-Soviet propaganda material produced by organisations, such as the Society of Cultural Relations with the Soviet Union of which Johnson was chairman.

== World War II ==
During World War II, Johnson strictly followed the Soviet line. After the Molotov–Ribbentrop Pact in 1939, he opposed the war even though Britain was at war against Germany, and he was accused of spreading defeatist propaganda. After Nazi Germany invaded the Soviet Union in 1941, he supported the war; his MI5 file reports that it was still judged "undesirable for the Dean of Canterbury to be allowed to lecture to troops".

Johnson was arguably the most prominent of the Western church leaders who are said to have persuaded Joseph Stalin to restore the Moscow Patriarchate. Stalin was successfully convinced that such a move would improve his relations with the Western Allies. Dmitri Volkogonov argued: "It was not the vanity of a former seminary dropout that moved the Soviet leader, but rather pragmatic considerations in relation with the Allies."

== Post-war ==
At the end of the war Johnson was awarded the Order of the Red Banner of Labour, in recognition of his "outstanding work as chairman of the joint committee for Soviet Aid", and in 1951 received the Stalin International Peace Prize. After the war, Johnson continued to use his public position to propound his pro-Soviet views. From 1948, he was the leader of the British-Soviet Friendship Organisation. In 1954, the Daily Sketch published a cartoon attacking Johnson, depicting him with devil horns and posing alongside black civil rights leaders Billy Strachan and Paul Robeson.

His influence began to wane, particularly after public sympathy for the Soviets in Britain declined dramatically after the Soviet invasion of Hungary in 1956. On the events in Hungary, Johnson later commented in his autobiography Searching for Light:

I was shocked by events in Hungary and Suez. In Hungary this attempted counter revolution found its causes in the fascist development of pre-war Hungary, it was spurred on in 1956 by the change in the Soviet Union brought about by the 20th Party Congress. (...) All this—the rise of those forces in Hungary determined to destroy socialist gains and who had direct connections with circles promoting German re-militarization—were the immediate occasion of the return of Soviet troops to Budapest. A new Hungarian Government was formed on 4th November 1956.

In the same year, he refused to embrace Nikita Khrushchev's denunciation of Joseph Stalin. Johnson's pro-communist activities were especially troublesome for the British government since foreigners tended to confuse Johnson, the Dean of Canterbury, with the Archbishop of Canterbury. According to Ferdinand Mount, "What infuriated his critics, from Gollancz on the left to Fisher on the right, was that there was no evidence that Johnson had made any but the most superficial study of the issues that he spouted on with such mellifluous certainty, from famines in the 1930s to germ warfare in Korea".

The headmaster of the King's School, Canterbury, Fred Shirley, manoeuvred against him. One year, Johnson put up a huge blue and white banner across the front of the Deanery which read "Christians Ban Nuclear Weapons". By way of riposte, some of the boys put up a banner on one of the school's buildings which read "King's Ban Communists". Johnson's adversaries have called his endeavours to unite Christianity and Marxism–Leninism a "heretical teaching concerning a new religion". Johnson denied those accusations and argued that he knew very well the difference between religion (Christianity) and politics (Marxism–Leninism). His religious views were in line with mainstream Anglicanism. His support for Marxist–Leninist politics was derived, in his own words, from the conviction that "[capitalism] lacks a moral basis" and that "it is the moral impulse [of communism] ... which constitutes the greatest attraction and presents the widest appeal."

His biographer Natalie K. Watson, in The Oxford Dictionary of National Biography (2004), wrote: "Communism, for Johnson, was not an anti-Christian force, but rather a natural result and a practical outworking of the Christian gospel. ... His extensive writings on Soviet Russia reflected a naive and romantic perspective on the transformation [of Russian life] after the 1917 revolution. Until the end of his life he ignored the realities of mass persecution and the extermination of political opponents, as well as the anti-religious aspects of Marxism and Stalinism."

== Personal life ==
Johnson was twice married. While still a student at Oxford in 1903, he married Mary, daughter of Frederick Taylor, a merchant of Broughton Park, Manchester. The couple had no children and she died of cancer in 1931. He remarried in 1938 to Nowell Mary (1906-1983), daughter of his cousin George Edwards (another Anglican priest), with whom he had two daughters.

== Later life ==
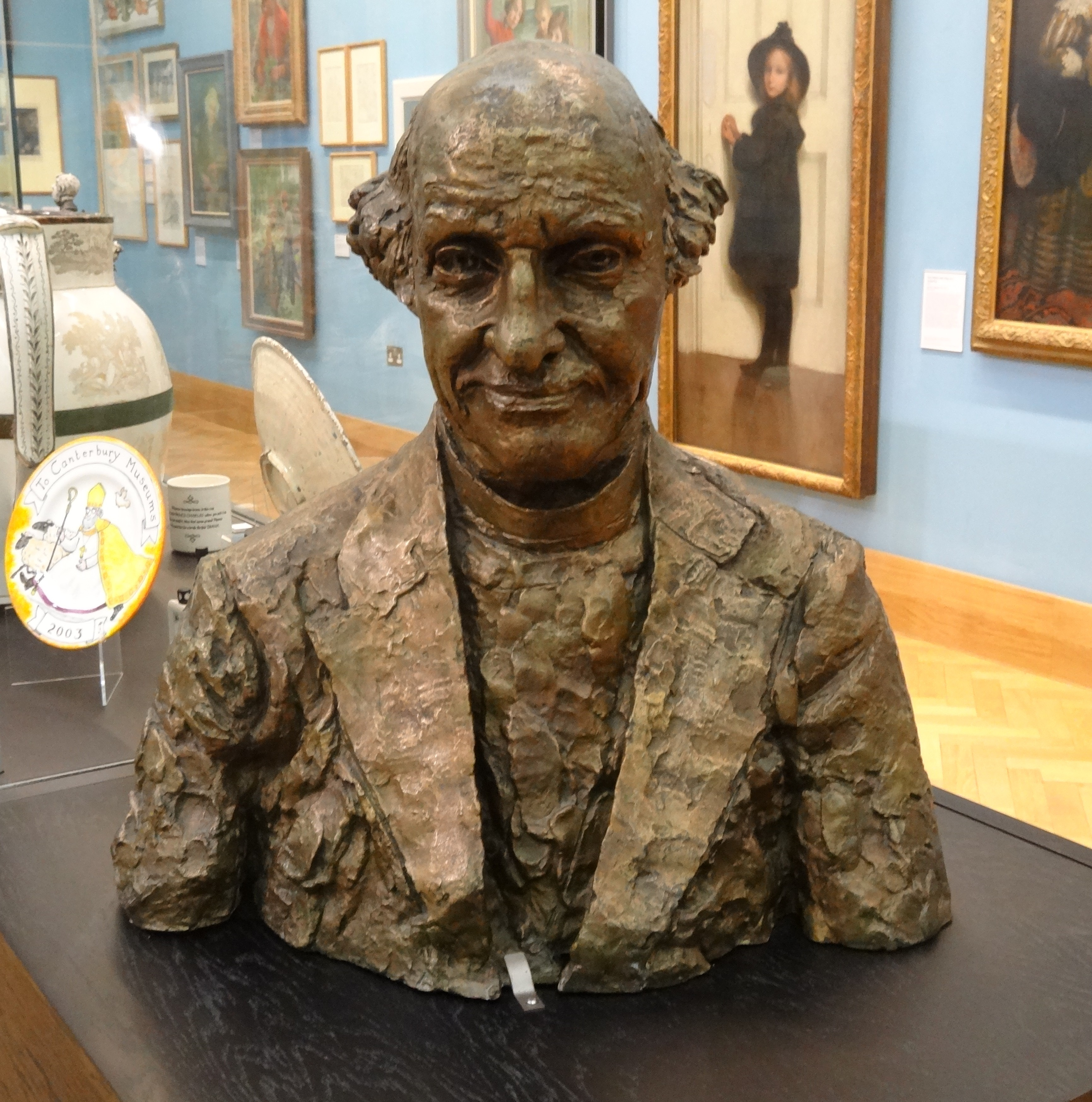
Bust of Johnson by Sir Jacob Epstein in the Beaney House of Art and Knowledge

Johnson retired as Dean of Canterbury in 1963, the year of his 89th birthday, but settled in the town where he lived at the Red House in New Street. While maintaining his interest in Communist world developments, he engaged in psychical research and completed before his death his autobiography, Searching for Light (posthumously published in 1968). He died, at the Kent and Canterbury Hospital in 1966 aged 92. He was buried in the Cloister Garth at Canterbury Cathedral.

== Collections ==
In 2007 Johnson's personal papers were deposited at the University of Kent Special Collections & Archives by his family. The archive includes photographs, extensive correspondence, newspaper cuttings and copies of his published and unpublished writings. Illustrated travel diaries by Nowell Johnson are also contained within the collection, featuring hand-drawn artwork from the couple's time abroad.

== Published works ==
- The Socialist Sixth of the World, 1939
- Searching for Light: an Autobiography (London, V. Gollancz, 1939)
- The Secrets of Soviet Strength, 1943
- Soviet Russia since the war (New York, Boni & Gaer, 1947)
- China's New Creative Age (London, Lawrence: 1953)
- Eastern Europe in the Socialist World (London, Lawrence and Wishart: 1955)
- Christians and Communism (London, 1956); Russian translation – Хьюлетт Джонсон. Христиане и коммунизм. М., Изд. иностранной литературы, 1957, 154 с.
- The Upsurge of China, 1961
- Searching for Light (autobiography), 1968 (posthumously published)

Church of England titles
Preceded by Gough McCormick	Dean of Manchester; 1924–1931	Succeeded by Garfield Williams
Preceded by Dick Sheppard	Dean of Canterbury; 1931–1963	Succeeded by Ian White-Thomson
