= Bowers (surname) =

Origin
- Language: Old English
- Meaning: A chamber; a cottage; a shady recess
- Region of origin: England

The surname Bowers is of Saxon origin, derived from the word 'bur' meaning 'a chamber; a cottage; a shady recess'. Adding 'er' to the end of topographical terms was common in south east England. An alternative origin is "a maker of bows".

== People with the name ==
- Albert Bowers, English professional rugby footballer
- Allen Bowers (born 1902), Australian rugby union player
- Andrea Bowers (born 1965), American artist
- Arthur Bowers (1919–1988), American politician
- Barney Bowers (born 1959), British football player
- Bathsheba Bowers (1671–1718), American Quaker author and preacher
- Bryan Bowers (born 1940), American autoharp player
- Brock Bowers (born 2002), American football player
- Cedrick Bowers (born 1978), American baseball player
- Charles Bowers (1889–1946), American cartoonist and comedian
- Charles P. Bowers (1929–2015), American baseball player, coach, and scout
- Chet Bowers (1935–2017), American educator, author, and environmental activist
- Chris Bowers (born 1974), American blogger and email manager
- Christopher Bowers-Broadbent (born 1945), English organist and composer
- Claude G. Bowers (1878–1958), American politician
- Clyde T. Bowers (1881–1968), American politician
- Cyril Y. Bowers, American professor of medicine
- Da'Quan Bowers (born 1990), American football player
- Dane Bowers (born 1979), British pop singer, songwriter and producer
- Dorothy Bowers (1902–1948), British novelist
- Drew Bowers (1886–1985), American politician
- Eaton J. Bowers (1865–1939), American politician
- Eden Bowers, Dominican politician
- Edgar Bowers (1924–2000), American poet
- Edward Charles Bowers (1845–1929), Canadian politician
- Edwin F. Bowers (1871–?), American alternative medicine activist
- Eilley Bowers (1826–1903), American miner, socialite and fortune-teller
- Elaine Bowers (born 1963), American politician
- Elizabeth Crocker Bowers (1830–1895), American actress
- Faubion Bowers (1917–1999), American author and orientalist
- Fredson Bowers (1905–1991), American bibliographer and scholar
- Geoffrey Bowers (1954–1987), American lawyer, plaintiff in early AIDS discrimination case
- Georgina Bowers (1836–1912), British artist
- Grace Bowers (born 2005), American blues rock guitarist and songwriter
- Jack Bowers (1908–1970), British football player
- Jack E. Bowers (1925–2007), American politician and lawyer
- Jane Bowers (1921–2000), American folk singer and songwriter
- Jane M. Bowers (1936–2022), American flautist, musicologist and feminist
- Joe Bowers, 20th-century English professional rugby league footballer
- Joseph Bowers (1896–1936), American escapee from Alcatraz prison
- Joseph Oliver Bowers (1910–2012), Dominican Catholic bishop
- Karl S. Bowers (1941–2012), American highway administrator
- Kathryn I. Bowers (1943–2015), American politician
- Kelci-Rose Bowers (born 2004), English professional footballer and model
- Kent Bowers (died 1985), Belizean murderer
- Kiara Bowers (born 1991), Australian rulers footballer
- Kimberly S. Bowers (born 1965), American businesswoman
- Kris Bowers (born 1989), American composer, pianist, and director
- Lally Bowers (1917–1984), British actress
- Laurence Bowers (born 1990), American basketball player
- Lee Bowers (1925–1966), witness to the assassination of John F. Kennedy
- Lefty Bowers (1909–1978), American professional baseball pitcher
- Lloyd Wheaton Bowers (1859–1910), American Solicitor General
- M. F. Bowers, 19th-century American sherriff from Colorado
- Marci Bowers (born 1958), American gynecologist
- Mike Bowers (born 1942), American lawyer and politician from Georgia
- Nick Bowers (born 1996), American football player
- Percy Bowers (1856–1922), British Anglican priest
- R. J. Bowers (born 1974), American football player
- Rhetta Bowers (born 1967), Americna politician
- Roni Bowers (died 2001), American Christian missionary
- Russell Bowers (born 1952), American politician from Arizona
- Sam Bowers (gridiron football) (born 1957), American football player
- Samuel Bowers (1924–2006), American Ku Klux Klan leader
- Scotty Bowers (1923–2019), American author and prostitute
- Sean Bowers (born 1968), American soccer player
- Stephen Bowers, Australian ceramicist and co-creator of the Yerrakartarta in Adelaide
- Stephen C. Bowers, California politician
- Stew Bowers (1915–2005), American baseball player
- Timmy Bowers (born 1982), American basketball player
- Tony Bowers (born 1952), British pop musician
- Veronza Bowers Jr. (born 1946), American musician and Black Panther Party member

== Fictional ==
- Henry Bowers, an antagonist of Stephen King's It

== Disambiguation ==
- Billy Bowers (disambiguation)
- Chris Bowers (disambiguation)
- David Bowers (disambiguation)
- Edward Bowers (disambiguation)
- George Bowers (disambiguation)
- Henry Bowers (disambiguation)
- John Bowers (disambiguation)
- Mary Bowers (disambiguation)
- Peter Bowers (disambiguation)
- Raymond Bowers (disambiguation)
- Richard Bowers (disambiguation)
- Robert Bowers (disambiguation)
- Ross Bowers (disambiguation)
- Shane Bowers (disambiguation)
- Thomas Bowers (disambiguation)
- William Bowers (disambiguation)

== See also ==
- Bauers, a similar surname
- Bower (surname)
