= Newsboy =

Newsboy or news boy may refer to:

- Newspaper hawker, a street vendor of newspapers
- Paperboy or papergirl, youngsters who distributed newspapers to subscribers

== People ==
=== Nicknames ===
- Newsboy Brown (1905–1977), American boxer
- Newsboy Moriarity (1910–1979), Irish-American mobster
- Abe the Newsboy (1887–1966), American boxer

=== Fictional ===
- Newsboy, a character played by Jeremy Wells on Mikey Havoc's MTV show in New Zealand
- "Newsboy", nickname for Pete, a character in Frenetic Five, a text-adventure series

== The arts ==
=== Film ===
- The Newsboy, an American film of 1905

=== Literature ===
- The Newsboy, an American 1854 novel by Elizabeth Oakes Smith
- News Boy, a play by Arch Brown featured at the Theatre Rhinoceros in San Francisco, California, U.S.

=== Music ===
- Newsboys, an Australian Christian pop/rock band
- "Newsboy", a 1966 single by English pianist Mrs Mills

=== Painting and sculpture ===
- The Newsboy, an 1889 painting by American George Newell Bowers
- The Newsboy, an 1879 painting by English painter Ralph Hedley
- The Newsboy, an 1869 painting by Canadian-American Edward Mitchell Bannister
- The News Boy, an 1841 painting by American Henry Inman
- The Newsboy, an outdoor sculpture by Bruce Hanners, in Columbus, Ohio, U.S.

== Transport ==
- Newsboy, an airplane that delivered newspapers for the McCook Gazette in Nebraska, U.S.
- Newsboy, a steam schooner acquired in 1895 by American Robert Dollar
- Newsboy, a 1994 bicycle model made by Merlin

== Other ==
- Newsboy model or newsvendor model, a demand-forecasting model in operations management
- Newsboys, a brand of cigar made by Brown Brothers Tobacco Company
- Newsboy, a horse that raced in the 1882 Kentucky Derby

== See also ==
- Newsboy cap, a casual-wear cap similar in style to the flat cap
- Newsboy Legion, a fictional kid gang in the DC Comics Universe
- Newsboys' strike of 1899, for boys who sold newspapers on the street
- Newsies (disambiguation)
