= George Bowers =

George Bowers may refer to:

- George Bower (medallist) (fl. 1664–1689), also written Bowers
- George Bowers (priest) (1794–1872), Anglican Dean of Manchester
- George Meade Bowers (1863–1925), American politician
- George Bowers (filmmaker) (1944–2012), director of Private Resort
- George B. Bowers (1878–1944), served in the California legislature
- George Newell Bowers (1849–1909), American painter
