= Newsies (disambiguation) =

Newsies is a 1992 American musical drama film.

Newsies may also refer to:

- Newsies (musical), a 2011 Broadway musical based on the film
- Newspaper hawker, or newsie, a newspaper seller without a newsstand

== See also ==
- Newsboy cap, or newsie cap, a style of hat popular in Europe and North America in the early 1900s
- Newsboy (disambiguation)
