= Tom Bowers =

British-born Seychelles sculptor (1936–2021)

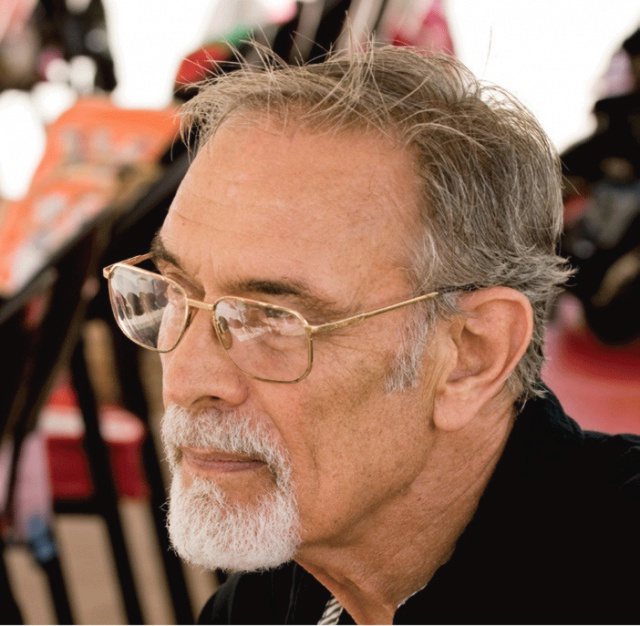
- Tom Bowers in 2014
- Born: Tom Bowers; 1936; London, United Kingdom
- Died: March 2021 (aged 84); Seychelles
- Occupations: Sculptor; photographer
- Years active: 1950–2021
- Notable work: Liberty Monument
- Children: Katy

Tom Bowers (c. 1936 – March 2021) was a British-born Seychellois sculptor and photographer.

== Life ==
Bowers was born in London, the United Kingdom where he studied graphic art and sculpture. He later worked as a freelance advertiser after he opened a photographic studio in London. In 1981, along with his family, he visited Seychelles on holiday before he decided to move into the country permanently in 1986.

In 2014, he was commissioned by the government of Seychelles to design the Liberty Monument to replace the controversial Zonm Lib (Free Man) monument. His sculpture studio was in Anse a la Mouche, Seychelles.

== Death ==
He died in March 2021, 84 years old.
