= Mary Bowers =

Mary Bowers may refer to:

- Mary Bowers (journalist) (born 1985), British journalist for The Times
- Mary Bowers (ship), blockade runner, shipwrecked in 1864
- Mary Helen Bowers (born 1979), American ballerina
