= Ross Bowers =

Ross Bowers may refer to:

- Ross Bowers (American football) (born 1996), American football quarterback
- Ross Bowers (ice hockey) (born 1985), British ice hockey player
