= The Comic History of Rome =

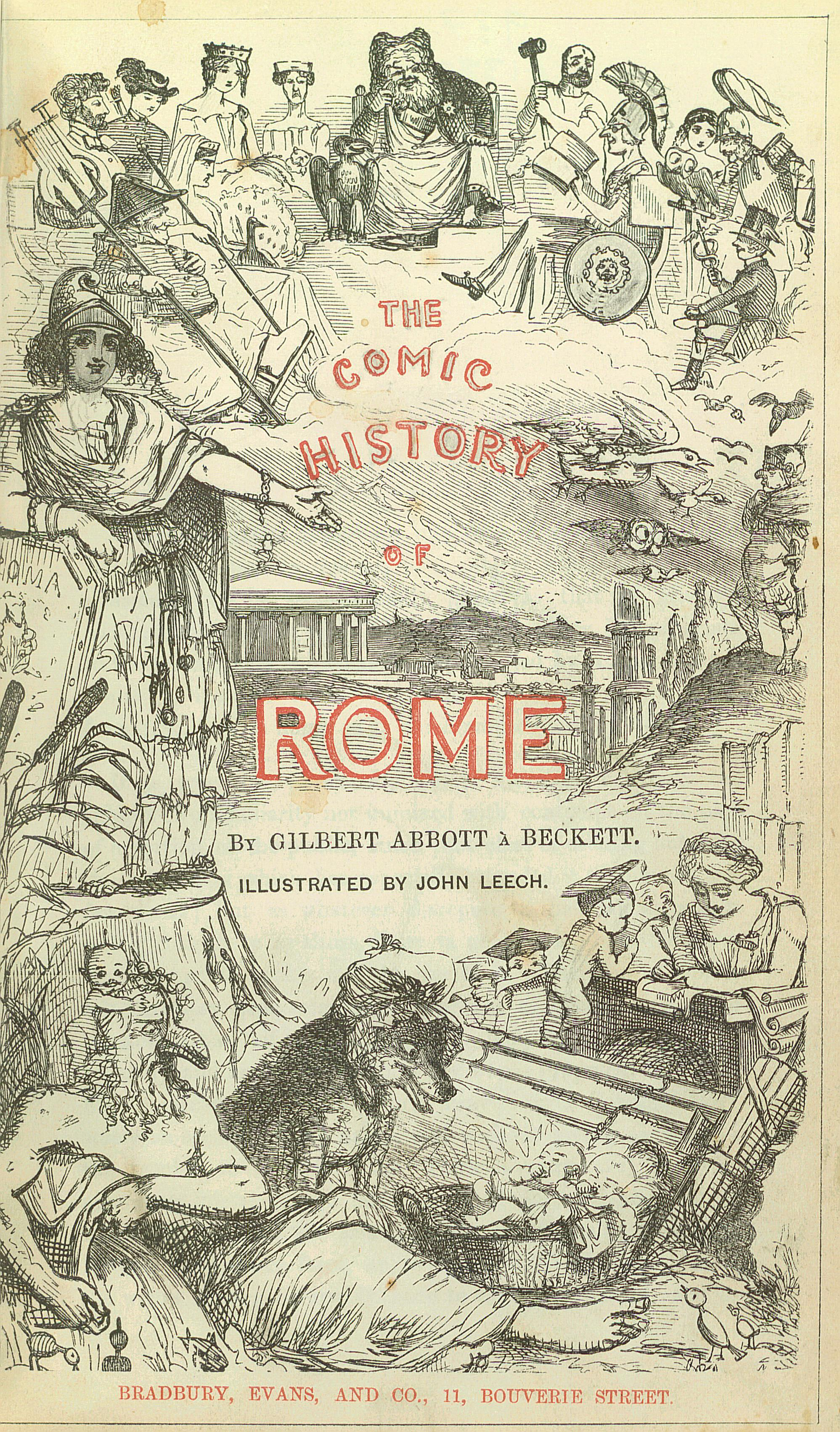
Title page of The Comic History of Rome (1851)

The Comic History of Rome (1851) is a humorous look at the people and events of ancient Rome from its foundation to the Assassination of Julius Caesar. It was published by Bradbury and Evans, with text by the English humorist Gilbert Abbott à Beckett and comic illustrations by John Leech, famous for his illustrations for the novella A Christmas Carol (1843) by Charles Dickens. In his introduction, à Beckett wrote that, "The writer of this book is animated by an earnest wish to aid, as far as he is able, in the project of combining instruction with amusement." Largely, however, to modern eyes the humour lies not in à Beckett's somewhat dated text but rather in Leech's illustrations, which, with their top-hat and toga wearing patricians directly lampoon Victorian society.

== Background ==
Gilbert à Beckett and John Leech first worked together while serving on the staff of the humorous magazine Punch, first published in 1841 under the editorship of Mark Lemon. Punch became famous for turning its satirical eye on London society, from the highest to the lowest in that early Victorian era. At that time the magazine's staff would meet weekly for dinner, debate and gossip around the famous Punch table, and it was after one such dinner in 1864 that Henry Silver, himself a contributor to Punch, mentioned Leech in his unpublished diary, commenting that the Tory-supporting Leech "sneers at the Working Man, as usual." His political and social views often brought Leech into conflict with other more liberal members of Punch staff concerning the content on its pages, with Leech's cartoons frequently showing the poor of London as being stupid, while the rich were shown as frivolous. However, à Beckett had some sympathy for the poor, which was reflected in his actions while serving as a Commissioner for the Poor Law when in 1849 he presented a valuable report to the Home Secretary regarding the Andover workhouse scandal.

== The Comic History of Rome ==
Leech and à Beckett first collaborated on their The Comic History of England (1847–1848), for which Leech had produced broadly humorous etchings. He created still finer illustrations to The Comic History of Rome (1851)— which, particularly in its minor woodcuts, shows some exquisitely graceful touches, as witness the fair faces that rise from the surging water in his illustration 'Claelia and her Companions escaping from the Etruscan Camp.'

Dr. Caroline Wazer, in her essay 'The Eternal Guffaw - John Leech and The Comic History of Rome ' wrote that the illustrations by Leech are:

"... a Victorian fever dream of ancient Rome. Senators pair their togas with top hats, generals wear muttonchops under their helmets, and priests styled as snake charmers draw gullible crowds with the help of coal-powered rotating billboards. The blending of past and present in Leech's illustrations is on one level a simple visual joke that reinforces the humor of the text, dragging the glories of Roman history down to the level of the contemporary London street."

Leech's illustrations sometimes closely follow à Beckett's words; for example as in his full-colour plate depicting the legend of Romulus and Remus with the She-wolf of the tale coming straight out of Red Riding Hood. At other times, however, Leech carefully drew his illustrations to reflect contemporary Victorian society and life - to their detriment. Gilbert à Beckett's text covering Roman history from its Foundation to the Fall of the Republic could certainly be compared to the England of 1851. Both the post-Industrial Revolution England and ancient Rome saw a rapidly growing urban poor population as well as the growth of a snobbish urban intellectual elite. In addition, many in England at the time saw what Caroline Wazer described as "the development of ... overtly demagogical politics" — in other words, all the things Leech had been lampooning in his cartoons in Punch for years.

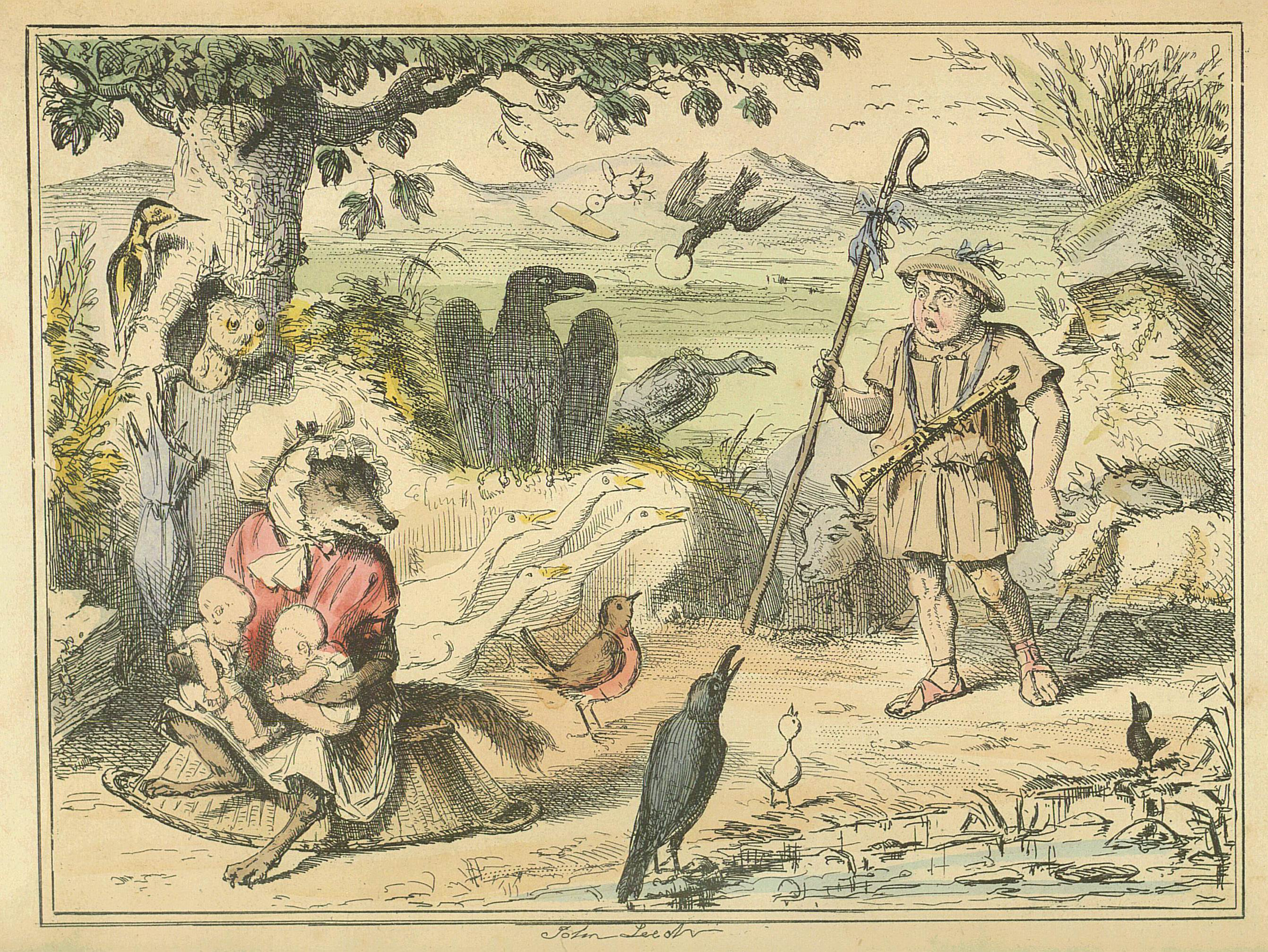
Romulus and Remus discovered by a gentle Shepherd

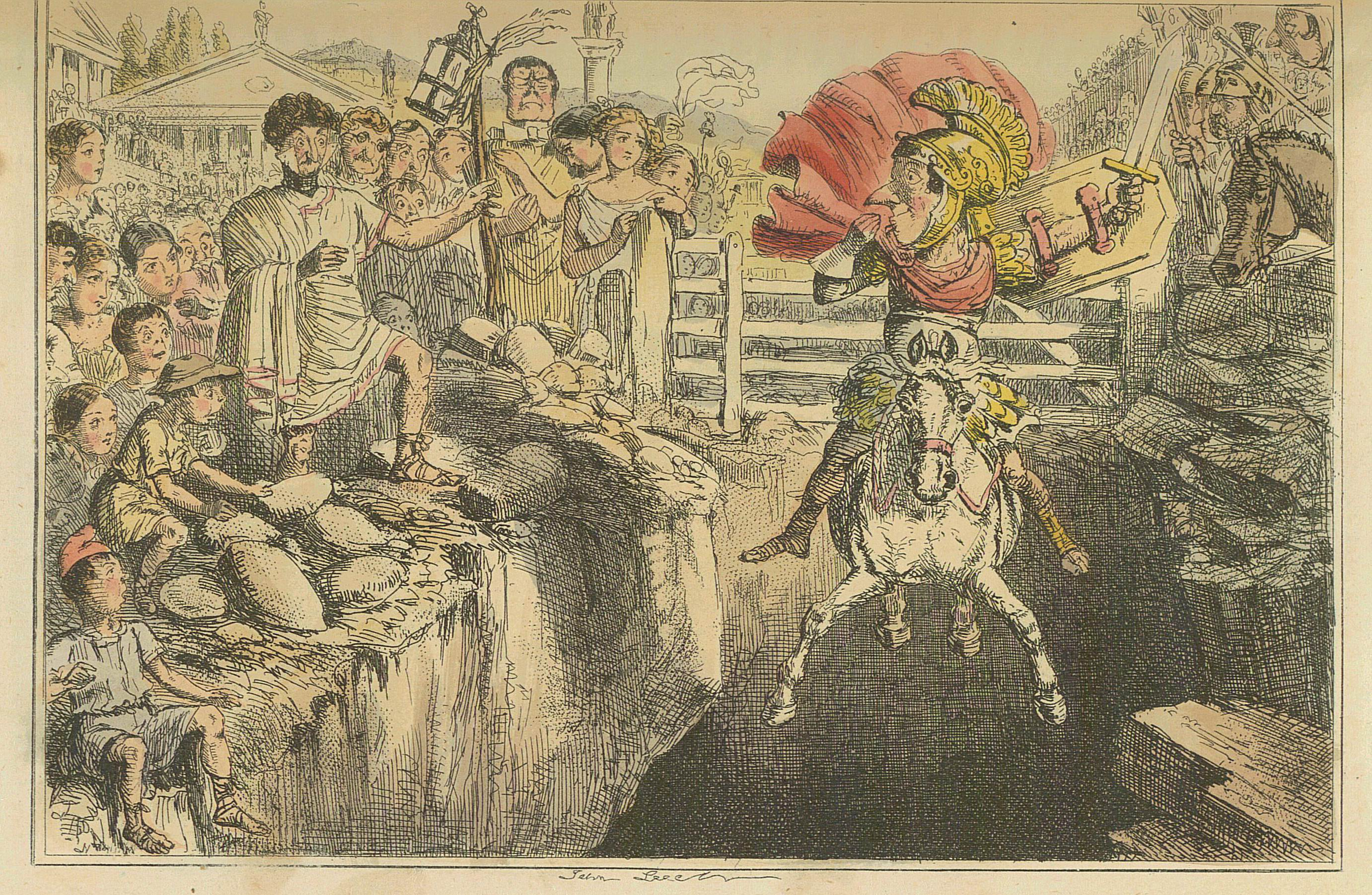
Marcus Curtius leaping into the Gulf

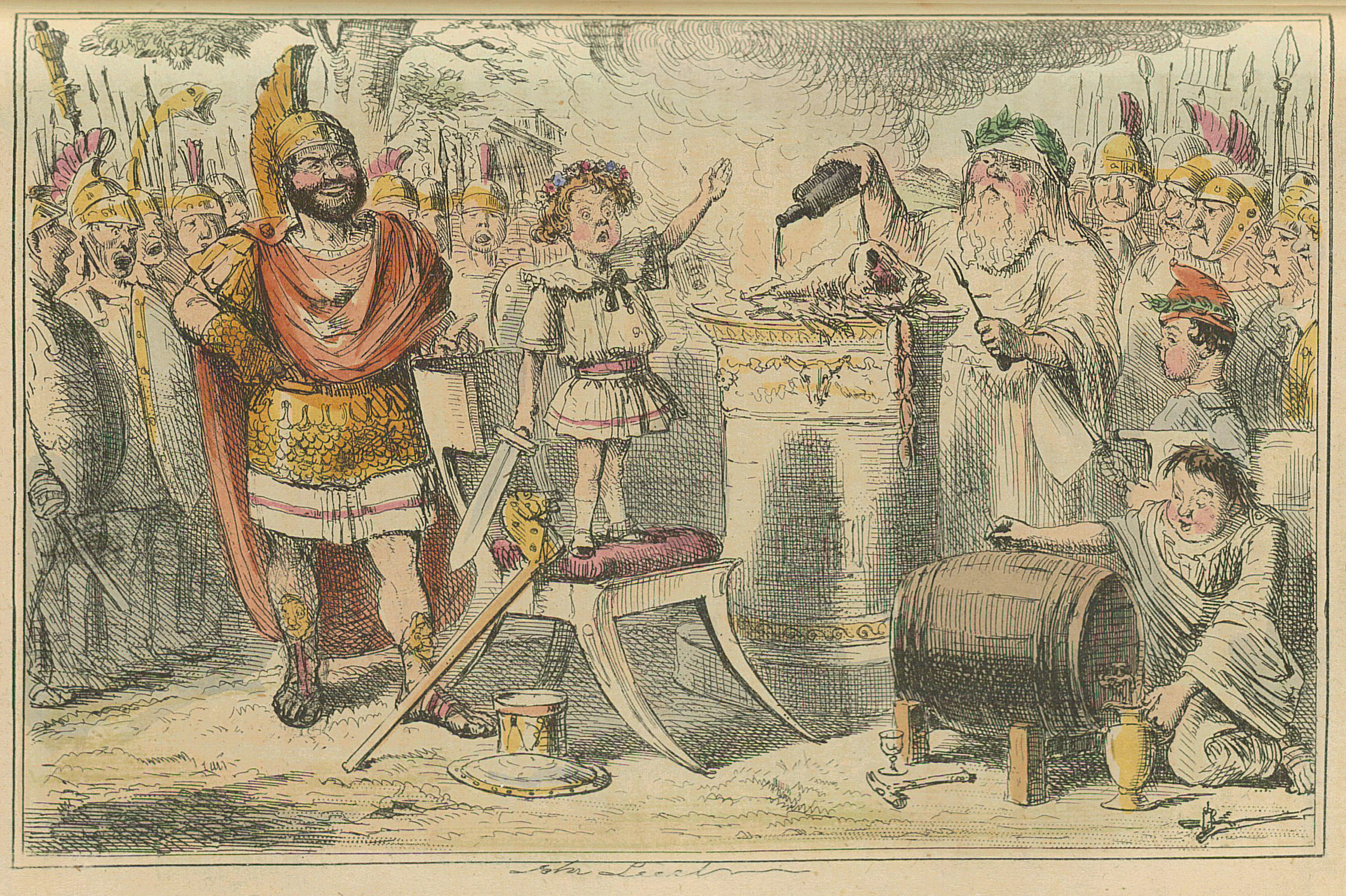
Hannibal swears eternal hatred to the Romans as a child

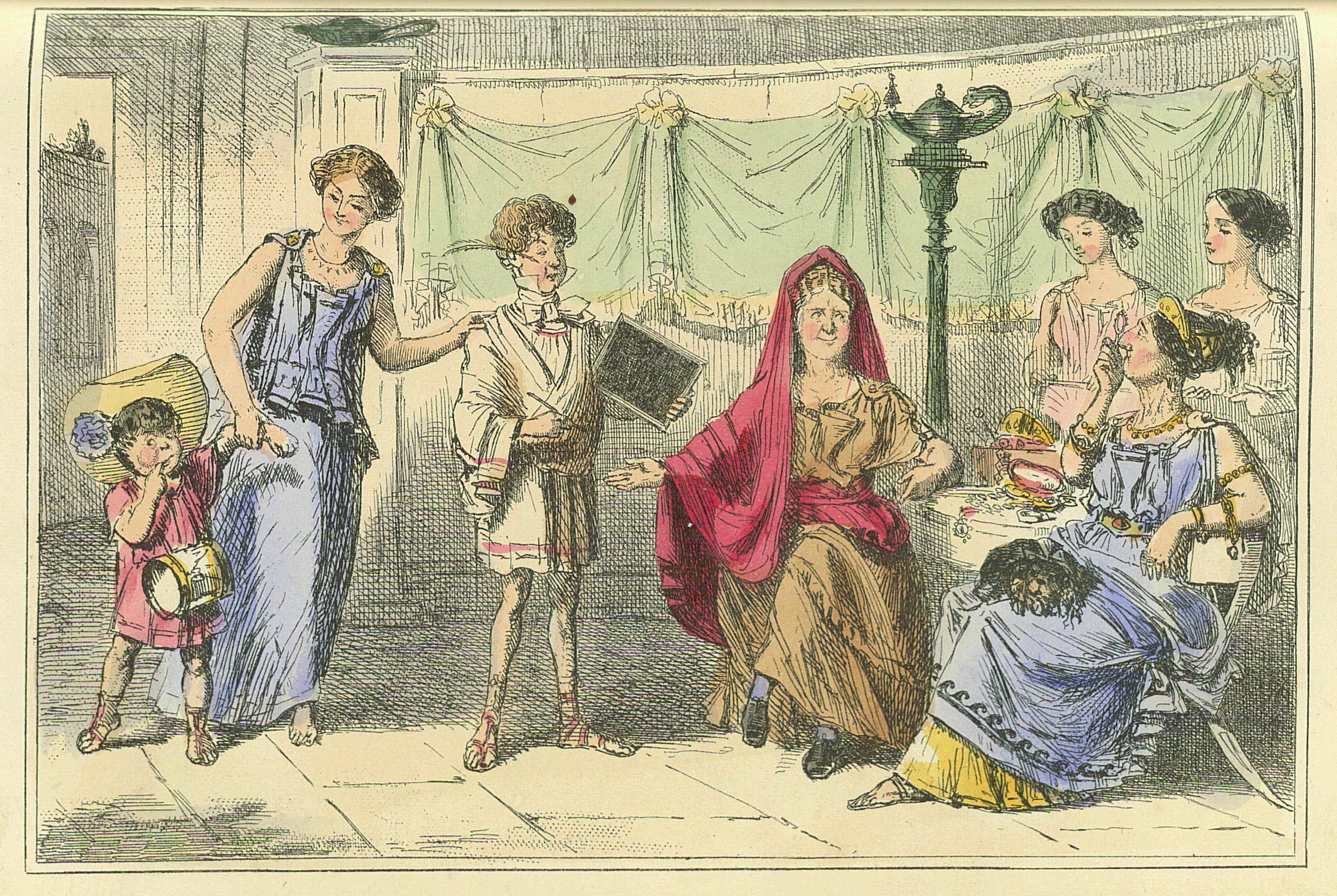
Cornelia Africana, mother of the Gracchi

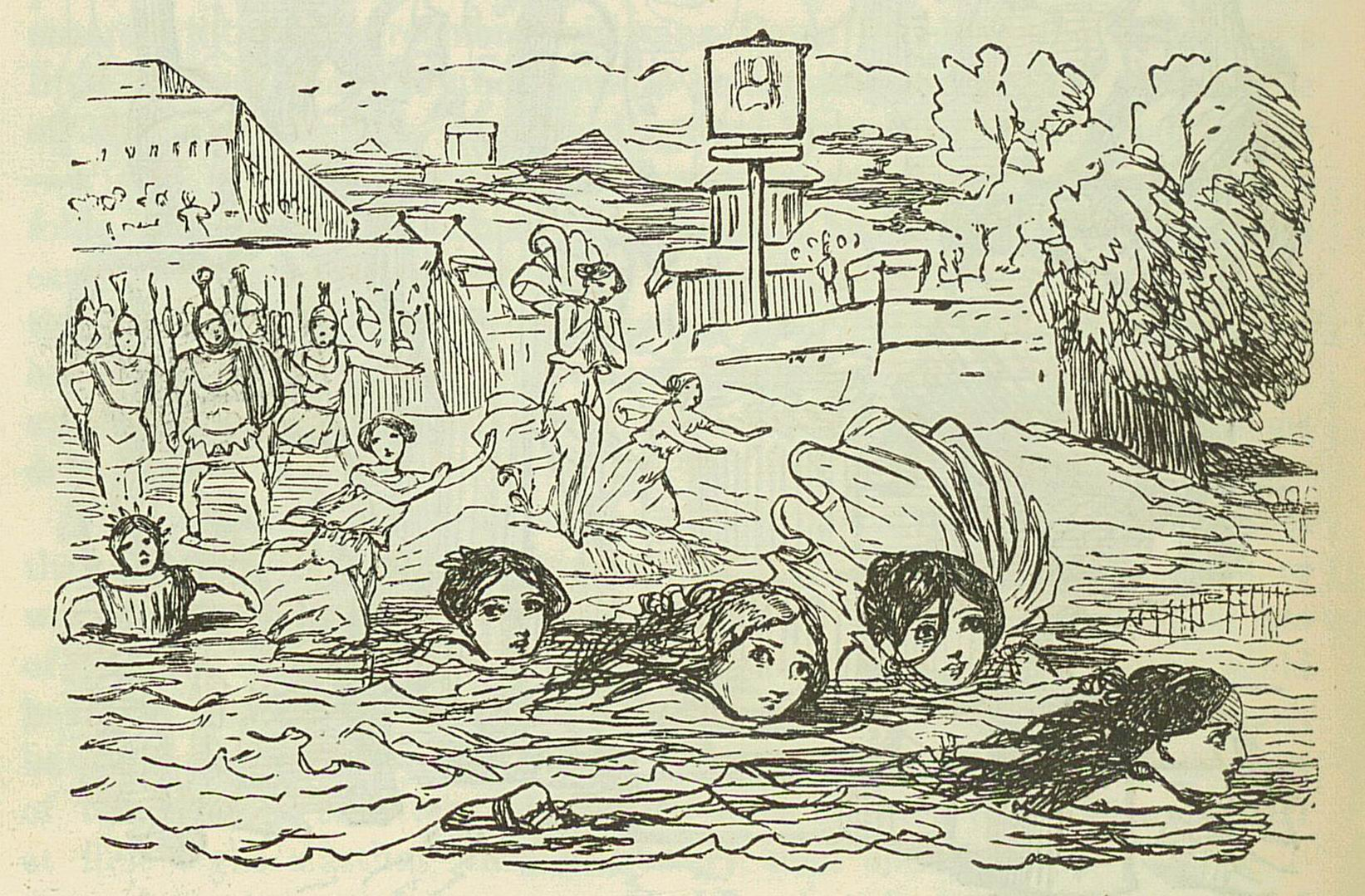
Cloelia and her Companions Escaping from the Etruscan Camp

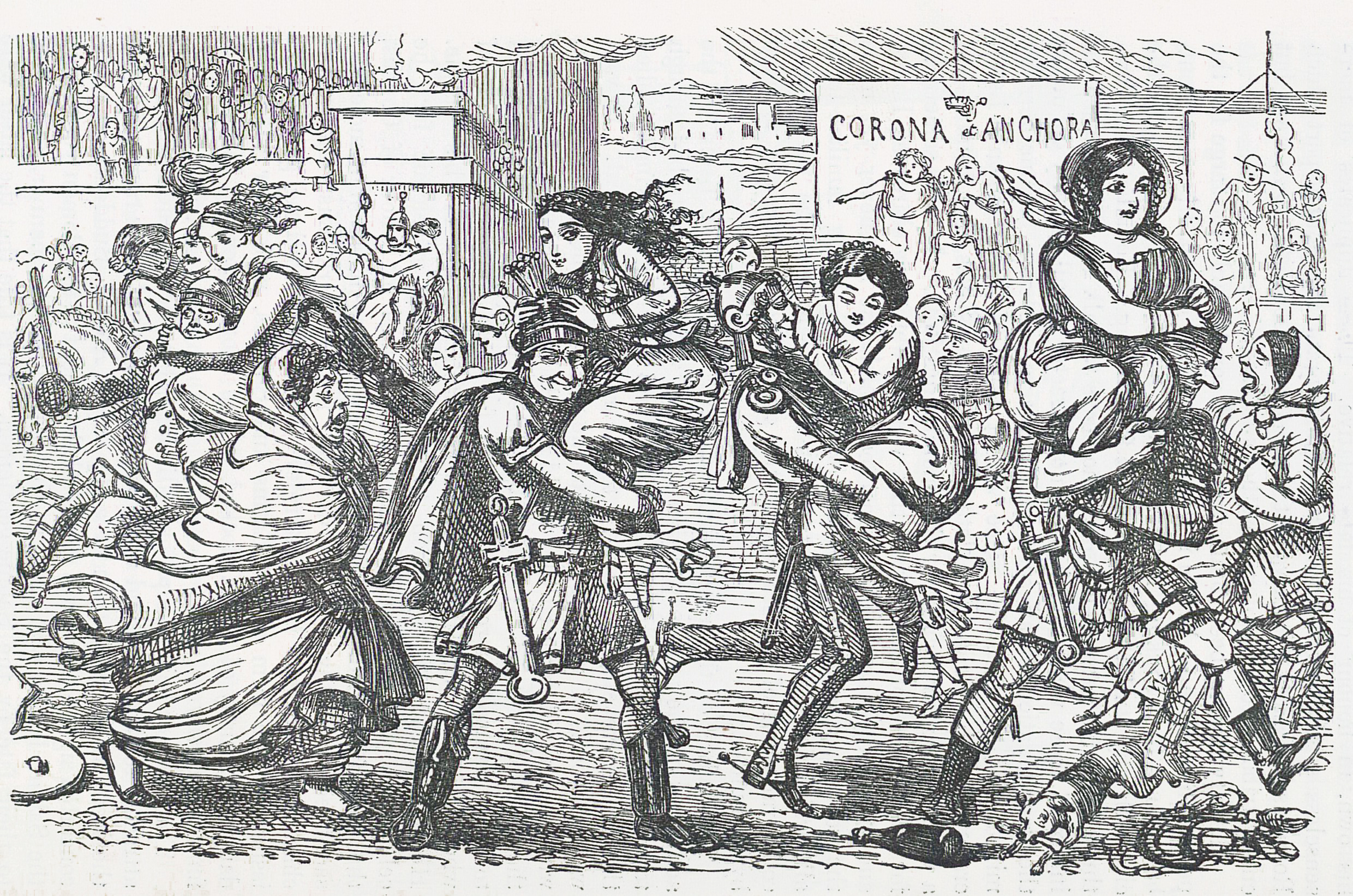
A scene from Leech's Comic History of Rome, depicting the Rape of the Sabine Women. The women are portrayed in Victorian costume being carried off from the "Corona et Ancora" ("Crown and Anchor", a common English pub sign in seafaring towns.)

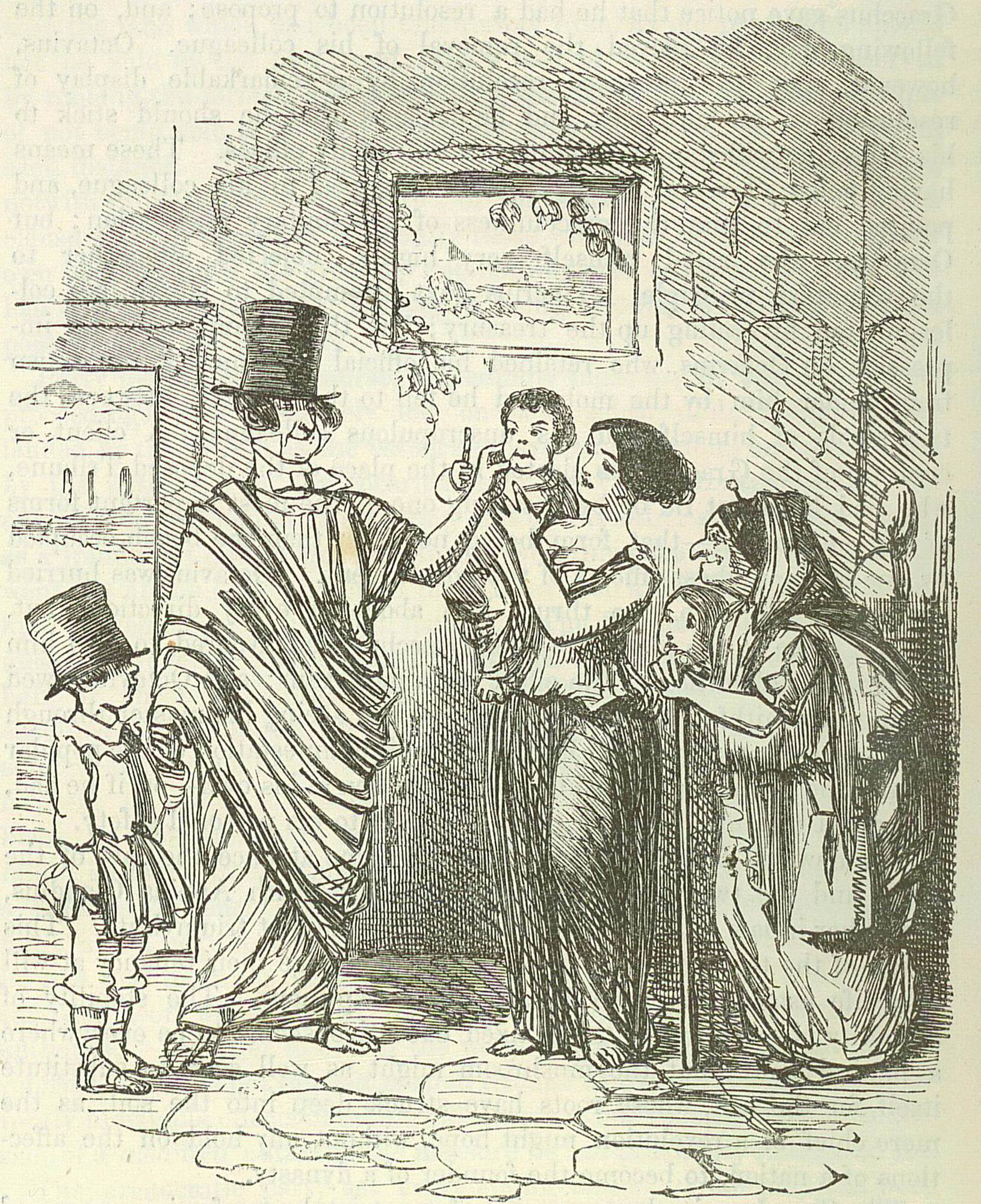
Tiberius Gracchus canvassing. The top hat worn by Gracchus is a deliberate anachronism intended to compare him to 19th-century British politicians.
