= Georgina Bowers =

English comic illustrator (1836–1912)

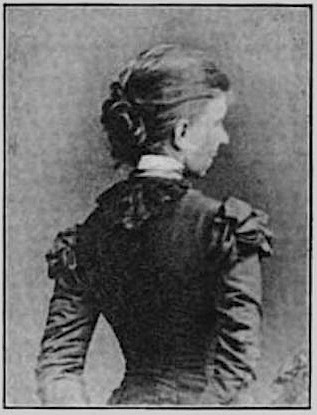
Photo of Georgina Bowers by S. A. Walker

Georgina Harriett Bowers (1836–1912) was a Victorian comic illustrator, and one of the first female humourists to be acknowledged professionally. As a child she had a personal connection with animals, and later in life realistic drawings of horses and dogs became common features in her artwork. Bowers is noted for her work as an illustrator for Punch, though she published many of her own comics as well.

== Early life ==
Georgina Bowers was born in 1836 in London, England, where her father, George Bowers, was the Rector of St Paul's, Covent Garden, and later became the Dean of Manchester. Her mother died before Bowers got to know her.

As a child, Bowers loved country life and animals, which would both become recurring subjects of her later work. From a young age she took an interest in drawing dogs and horses, though her governess discouraged it, insisting instead that she focus on needlework and reading. This proved fruitless, however, and Bowers ended up drawing in most of her free time, of which she had quite a lot. At 15 she was sent to Derbyshire, where she was tutored privately in subjects such as music, drawing, and German. Despite being tutored in drawing, she was discouraged yet again from drawing animals. Instead, her teacher only advised her in watercolour sketching, which was deemed more appropriate for a young woman such as herself.

== Career ==
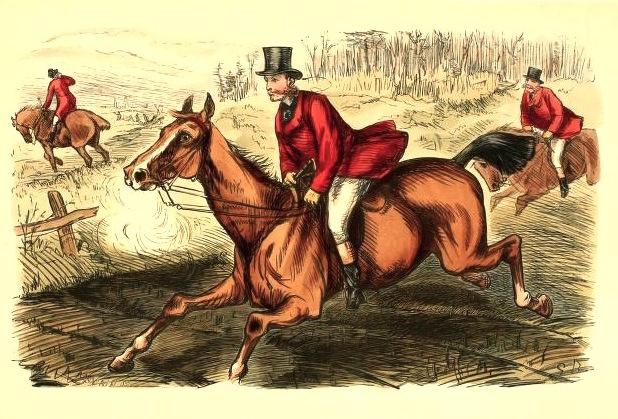
A panel from "Hollybush Hall" by Georgina Bowers.

After her coming out, in which she was presented officially as a woman in society ready to be married, Bowers decided to begin studying at the Manchester School of Art. This was unusual for a woman in her position, and she devoted much of her time to it.

Later she became an illustrator for Punch, working with artists such as Mark Lemon, Shirley Brooks, and John Leech. After Leech died in 1864, however, she moved to Hertfordshire to work and be near the countryside and partake in many sporting studies, as well as artistic studies of horses and dogs while hunting. Bowers once stated that the vast majority of the jokes in her own publications were inspired by incidents that had occurred while out hunting.

By 1876, Bowers was designing nearly all of the hunting subjects for Punch, and spent her days with her dogs or on horseback, keeping a sketchbook in her saddlebag at all times so that she could draw the animals and scenery around her. Bowers worked for Punch from 1866 to 1876 and exhibited with the Society of Female Artists in 1862. Between 1862 and 1889 she illustrated a number of sporting and nature books including "Canters in Crampshire", c. 1880, "Mr Crop's Harriers" from c. 1880, and "Tales for Sportsmen" in 1883. Other works illustrated by Bowers in the 1880s included "A Month in the Midlands", "Notes From a Hunting Box" and "Across Country".

Bowers married Henry Edwards, a vet from St Albans, Hertfordshire, which is where the couple settled. Bowers died in Hertfordshire in 1912.

== Publications ==
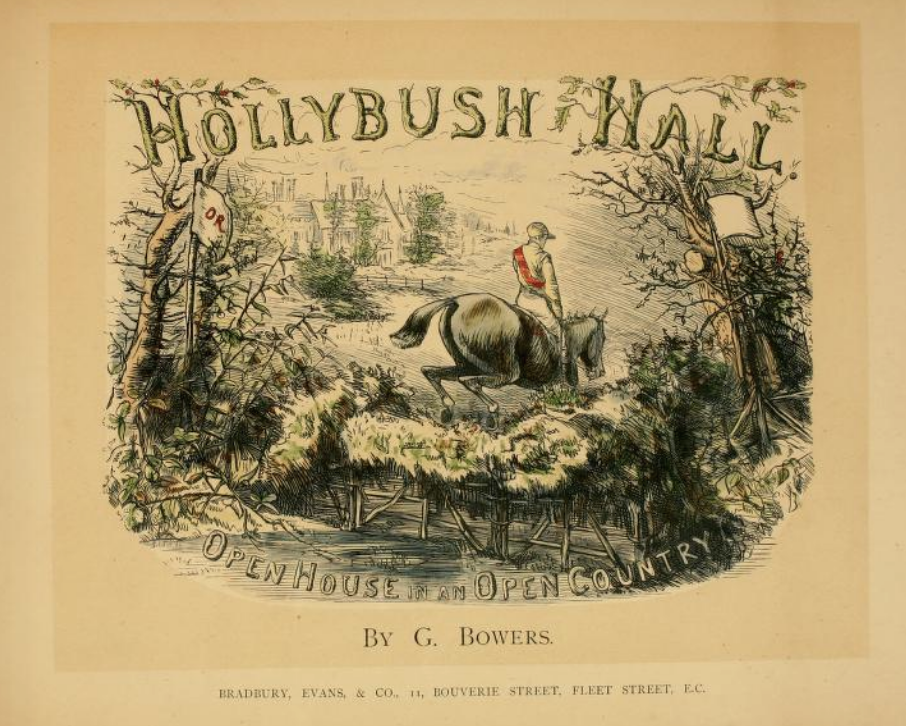
Cover of Hollybush Hall by Georgina Bowers

Some of Bowers's publications include:

- Hollybush Hall, or, Open House in an Open Country, a collection of 16 of her comics (1871)
- The illustrations for A Loose Rein by Elim Henry D'Avigdor (1887)
- The illustrations for Castles and Their Heroes by Barbara Hutton (1868)
