= Thomas Bowers =

Thomas, Tom or Tommy Bowers may refer to:

- Thomas Bowers (bishop) (1660–1724), Anglican Bishop of Chichester (England)
- Thomas Bowers (singer) (1826–1885), American singer
- Thomas J. Bowers (1828–1893), chief justice of the Idaho Territorial Supreme Court
- Tom Bowers (c. 1936–2021), British sculptor and photographer
