= David Bowers =

David Bowers may refer to:

- David A. Bowers (born 1952), former mayor of Roanoke, Virginia
- David Bowers (director) (born 1970), British animator and film director
- David Frederick Bowers (1906–1945), American philosopher
- Q. David Bowers (born 1938), American numismatic author

== See also ==
- David Bower (born 1969), Welsh actor
