= Bauers =

Bauers is a surname. Notable people with the surname include:

- Jake Bauers (born 1995), American baseball player
- Jason Bauers, drummer in American mathcore band Psyopus
- Russ Bauers (1914–1995), American baseball player

== Fictional characters ==
- Joe Bauers, fictional character in 2006 film, Idiocracy

== See also ==
- Bowers (surname)
