= Liberty Monument (Seychelles) =

- Laliberte
- Interactive map of Liberty Monument
- Location: 5 June Avenue, Victoria, Seychelles
- Coordinates: 4°37′28″S 55°27′17″E
- Designer: Tom Bowers
- Type: sculpture
- Material: bronze
- Beginning date: 2014
- Completion date: 2014
- Dedicated to: Seychelles Independence

Laliberte (English: Liberty Monument) is an historic monument in Victoria, Seychelles. It was erected in celebration of the Seychelles' independence from Britain.

== History ==
It was unveiled by James Michel on 29 June 2014 during an Independence Day celebration as a replacement of the Zonm Lib (English: free man) statue which was erected in 1978.

== Design ==
The Liberty Monument was designed and sculpted by Tom Bowers and was cast in bronze at the Bronze Age Foundry in Cape Town, South Africa. It depicts a man and a woman holding over their heads the national flag.
