= Raymond Bowers =

Raymond Bowers may refer to:

- R. J. Bowers (born 1974), American football player in the National Football League
- Raymond Bowers (actor), British actor
- Raymond Bowers (writer) (born 1919/20), Australian writer
