= Shane Bowers =

Shane Bowers may refer to:

- Shane Bowers (baseball) (born 1971), American baseball player
- Shane Bowers (ice hockey) (born 1999), Canadian ice hockey player
