= Kimberly S. Bowers =

American executive

- Born: Kirtland, Ohio
- Education: Miami University in Ohio (BA), University of Texas School of Law (JD), Stanford Executive Program.
- Occupations: Former CEO, Chairman of the Board, Director and President of CST Brands, Inc., Director of WPX Energy, Inc., and Executive Vice President and Divisional President of Valero Energy Corp.

Kimberly S. Bowers (also known as Kim Lubel) (born 1965) is the former CEO, Chairman of the Board, Director and President of CST Brands, Inc. She is also the Director of WPX Energy, Inc and an Executive Vice President and Divisional President of Valero Energy Corp. Bowers is one of only 26 women who are CEOs of Fortune 500 companies.

== Early life and education ==
Born Kimberly Smith, Bowers is the second of four children. She grew up in Kirtland, Ohio, a small town east of Cleveland. Her high school graduating class had 100 students. She planned to become a Spanish teacher like her mother, and majored in Spanish and international studies at Miami University in Ohio, where she received a bachelor's degree.

Bowers has a Juris Doctor from the University of Texas Law School.

In 2009, Bowers graduated from the Stanford Executive Program.

== Career ==
Upon graduating from University of Texas Law School Bowers began to work for Kelly Hart & Hallman in Fort Worth, Texas. She became schooled in the "art of the deal" there while working together with fellow attorney Lisa Peterson in mergers and acquisitions.

In 1997 Bowers left Kelly Hart & Hallman and began to work for Valero. She was the Managing Counsel and Vice President of Legal Services until January 2003. In that year Bowers was promoted to Vice President of Legal Service where she remained until April 2006. She then served as Executive Vice President and General Counsel at Valero, beginning in April 2006 until November, 2012. In November 2012 she was elected as Executive Vice president of Retail Marketing. During the six years prior to joining CST Bowers served as Lead Attorney for all of Valero's major acquisitions. In November 2012 she became the Chairman and a member of the Board of CST Brands, and on January 1, 2013 she became the CEO and President.
