= Albert Bowers =

England international rugby league footballer

Personal information
- Full name: Albert Bowers

Playing information
- Position: Wing
Club
Years	Team	Pld	T	G	FG	P
1938–49	Hull FC
Representative
Years	Team	Pld	T	G	FG	P
1947	England	2	0	0	0	0

Albert Bowers was an English professional rugby league footballer who played in the 1930s and 1940s. He played at representative level for England, and at club level for Hull FC, as a wing.

== International honours ==
Bowers won caps for England while at Hull in 1947 against Wales (2 matches).
