= David Frederick Bowers =

American academic

David Frederick Bowers (October 20, 1906, Pittsburgh, Pennsylvania – July 17, 1945, Springfield, Massachusetts) was a philosophy professor, noteworthy as a Guggenheim Fellow.

Bowers graduated from Capital University with A.B. in 1929 and from Princeton University with A.M. in 1930 and Ph.D. in 1932. In Princeton University's philosophy department, he was an instructor from 1934 to 1938 and an assistant professor beginning in 1938. He was also an instructor at Harvard University and Radcliffe College in 1938.

Bowers was the co-editor with George Tapley Whitney (1871–1938) of The Heritage of Kant (1939); Bowers contributed two papers to the collection of 17 papers. His 1932 doctoral dissertation Atomism, Empiricism, and Skepticism (on the philosophies of David Hume and Bertrand Russell) was published as a 44-page booklet in 1940. He was the editor of Foreign Influences in American Life (1944); he contributed two of the eight essays in the collection. He was a Guggenheim Fellow for the academic year 1943–1944. He participated in the Kahler-Kreis.

In 1945 he was killed in a railroad train accident while en route with his wife and two children for a Vermont vacation.
