= Richard Bowers =

Richard Bowers may refer to:

- Richard Bowers (cricketer) (born 1976), English cricketer
- Dick Bowers (Richard T. Bowers, 1930–2007), American college athletics administrator
- Richard Bowers, US soldier who first sang "Gomen-nasai", and also featured in Mission Over Korea 1953
- Richard Bowers, composer for TV and films Candles in the Dark, She's No Angel, Dead at 17
- Richard Bowers, co-founder of Zero Population Growth with Charles Lee Remington and Paul R. Ehrlich

== See also ==
- Richard Plant Bower (1905–1996), Canadian diplomat
- Richard Bower (died 1561), Royal choirmaster of the Tudor period
