= Veronza Bowers Jr. =

Black Panther Party member

- Born: Veronza Leon Curtis Bowers Jr. February 4, 1946 (age 80)
- Status: Released
- Conviction: First degree murder of a federal employee (18 U.S.C. §§ 1111 and 1114)
- Penalty: Life imprisonment

Details
- Victims: 1

Veronza Leon Curtis Bowers Jr. (born February 4, 1946) is a former member of the Black Panther Party, and musician. He was sentenced to life imprisonment after being convicted by a jury on the charge of first degree murder of U.S. park ranger Kenneth Patrick at Point Reyes National Seashore in 1973. According to a 1976 Ninth Circuit Court of Appeal opinion affirming the denial of a motion to suppress evidence obtained with a search warrant at a residence, the evidence against Bowers included physical evidence connecting him to the scene of the crime.

The primary evidence also included the eye-witness testimony from a co-defendant who stated he was one of two other people in the car when Bowers shot Ranger Patrick when Ranger Patrick approached the car on suspicion the occupants were deer poaching. The facts of the original case were summarized in a 2011 Eleventh Circuit Court of Appeals opinion in Bowers v. Keller, 651 F.3d 1277 dealing with parole matters. He was incarcerated at a federal correctional institution in North Carolina. He was released on May 7, 2024.

== Early life ==
Veronza Bowers Jr. was raised in McAlester, Oklahoma, and later Omaha, Nebraska. His father, Veronza Bowers Sr., was a sergeant in the United States Army. In 1963, Bowers Jr. began his military service in the United States Navy Reserve before graduating Omaha South High School in 1964. Bowers Jr. went active duty in 1966 and was discharged in 1967.

In 1968, the Black Panther Party appointed Eddie Bolden to start a chapter of the organization in Omaha, Nebraska. Soon after, Bolden recruited Bowers to help develop the new chapter. When Bowers relocated to California, he took on leadership of the Richmond chapter of the Party. According to a statement by a former girlfriend included in the affidavit for a search warrant in the murder investigation, Bowers was "kicked out" of the Black Panthers party in Oakland and started his own revolutionary group.

== Incarceration ==
Bowers was eligible for mandatory parole after 30 years. In February 2005, 10 months after he served 30 years in prison, his parole was postponed to give the victim's relatives a chance to express their opposition at a new parole hearing. Bowers was denied parole in October 2005 and December 2011. Bowers has maintained his innocence during his entire 46 years of imprisonment, and through all parole hearings.
