= Mary Bowers (journalist) =

British journalist

Mary Bowers is a journalist for The Times newspaper in the United Kingdom. She was seriously injured and left with severe brain damage after being crushed by a lorry on 4 November 2011, and her case became the focal point for The Times Cities Fit For Cycling campaign.

== Career ==
Born in 1984, Bowers attended Queens' College, Cambridge, where she was editor of the Varsity student newspaper. After she attained a degree in history, she studied journalism as an O'Hara-Forster scholar at Columbia University, New York.

Bowers began her career as a freelance journalist, with articles in The Guardian and The Observer. She then became a news and multimedia reporter for The Times of India in Delhi. She joined The Times as a graduate trainee in September 2009, and spent some time as a freelance researcher on the Comment and Foreign desks. In August 2011, she was promoted to a news reporter and feature writer. Some of her more noted articles are about the London riots and the Julian Assange extradition hearings, as well as covering major music festivals such as Bestival, Latitude, and the Glastonbury Festival.

Bowers also had a keen interest in folk music, and performed with a guitar as part of Mary Bowers & The Wrong Collective, as well as playing as a solo musician at smaller folk music events in London.

== Incident ==
At 09.30 on 4 November 2011, Bowers was cycling to work at the News International building. 100 yards (91 m) from her workplace, on Dock Street, a 32 long tons (33 t) Lynch Haulage aggregate lorry pulled up behind her. The driver, Petre Beiu, was having a hands-free phone conversation at the time, and drove over her twice after forgetting to put the handbrake on. Emergency services arrived at the scene within three minutes of the incident, and Bowers was still conscious at the time. However, she soon fell into a coma as a result of a severe brain injury, two severely broken legs, a severed artery, a punctured lung, a broken arm and a broken pelvis.

Bowers is now in a minimally conscious state and will spend the rest of her life in a care home.

Beiu was found guilty by a jury of careless driving, and was fined £2,700 and banned from driving for eight months.
