= Henry Bowers =

Henry Bowers may refer to:

- Henry F. Bowers (1837–1911), American politician
- Henry Robertson Bowers (1883–1912), British explorer
- Henry Bowers, fictional character in It by Stephen King
