= Ross Bowers (ice hockey) =

British ice hockey forward

- Born: 30 July 1985 (age 40) Luton, England
- Height: 6 ft 0 in (183 cm)
- Weight: 171 lb (78 kg; 12 st 3 lb)
- Position: Forward
- Shoots: Right
- NIHL team Former teams: Milton Keynes Thunder; Basingstoke Bison
- Playing career: 2002–present

Ross Bowers (born 30 July 1985 in Luton) is a British ice hockey forward currently playing for the Milton Keynes Lightning of the EPL.

Bowers previously spent six seasons in the English Premier Ice Hockey League with the Milton Keynes Lightning before joining the Bison for the 2008–09 Elite League season, rejoining Lightning for the 2011–12 season.
