= Chet Bowers =

American writer

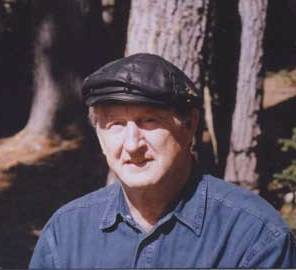
- Born: June 4, 1935; Portland, Oregon
- Died: July 13, 2017 (aged 82)
- Education: Lewis and Clark College, Portland State University (B.S.), University of California, Berkeley (Ph.D)
- Occupation(s): educator, author, lecturer, activist
- Known for: writings on the cultural and linguistic roots of the ecological crisis
- Spouse: Mary Katharine Roberts Bowers
- Children: 2 daughters
- Website: http://www.cabowers.net/

C. A. (Chet) Bowers (June 4, 1935 – July 13, 2017) was an American educator, author, lecturer and environmental activist. He wrote 27 books that focus on the cultural, linguistic, and technological roots of the current ecological crisis as well as the educational reforms necessary to promote greater ecological awareness.

== Summary of ideas ==
Over four decades, Chet Bowers reminded students, academics and activists that words have a history, that metaphors contain cultural perceptions that may be inadequate to address the challenges of the modern world. Bowers also contended that the digital age and computer learning, while broadly accepted as progressive and positive, have acted to homogenize cultural diversity and thought.

Fritjof Capra, physicist and founder of the Center for Ecoliteracy, said of him: "C. A. Bowers has argued eloquently [that] language is metaphoric, conveying tacit understandings shared within a culture."

In the preface of his book Pagans in the Promised Land, author Steven T. Newcomb, co-founder and co-director of the Indigenous Law Institute, said: "I learned of the importance of metaphors and metaphorical frameworks in the social construction of reality. Bowers helped me understand that metaphors are carriers of and therefore connected to complex metaphorical systems."

In her book The Resurgence of the Real, Body, Nature and Place in a Hypermodern World, Charlene Spretnak said: "One of the most astute critics of computer mediated learning, Chet Bowers, has focused attention on the largely unexamined ways in which computer use amplifies or reduces various cultural orientations." Spretnak discussed at some length Bowers's views on the ways in which the use of computers and digital information for education changes the educational process and culture, reinforcing "what Bowers calls 'the particular messianic ethos of modernity'".

=== Challenging orthodoxies ===
Jerry Mander, in the book The Case Against the Global Economy said:

C. A. Bowers has been focusing on the way computer usage affects the basic ecological and political values of the people who use them. Bowers makes the case that the advance of computers is contributing to a loss of ecological sensitivity and understanding ... particularly educating through computers, effectively excludes an entire set of ideas and experiences that heretofore had been the building blocks for a developing connection with the earth.

In his book The False Promises of Constructivist Theories of Learning, Bowers referred to Gregory Bateson's idea that everything is in some form of relationship, and information exchange affects the life-forming and sustaining nature of the organism.

Cultural historian Thomas Berry, in his book The Great Work: Our Way into The Future wrote, "Another term coming into use is Earth literacy, as a basic context for educational programs from the earliest years through professional levels. Earth literacy is being fostered especially by educators such as David Orr of Oberlin College and Chet Bowers of Portland State."

=== The cultural commons ===
In their book EcoJustice Education: Toward Diverse, Democratic and Sustainable Communities, Rebecca A. Martusewicz, Jeff Edumundson and John Lupinacci wrote:

Drawing on the work of C. A. Bowers (1997, 2001b) in particular, we offer the following interrelated elements to define EcoJustice: ... 4. The recognition and protection of diverse cultural and environmental commons—the necessary interdependent relationship of humans with the land, air, water, and other species with whom we share this planet, and the intergenerational practices and relationships among diverse groups of people that do not require the exchange of money as the primary motivation and generally result in mutual aid and support.

In his book The Way Forward: Educational Reforms that Focus on the Cultural Commons, Bowers provided a conceptual framework for understanding the ecological importance of the world's diversity of cultural commons and how this diversity is currently undermined by global market forces and digital technologies that overwhelm intergenerational communication. Bowers said that intergenerational knowledge and skills, which vary from culture to culture, are becoming increasingly important as population growth and changes in natural systems limit sources of food, water and other life-sustaining necessities.

=== Ecological intelligence ===
Reviewing Bowers' book The Culture of Denial: Why the Environmental Movement Needs a Strategy for Reforming Universities and Public Schools, Eric Shibuya wrote:

Bowers argues that the educational system needs to be completely restructured to instill values and teach practices that lead to ecologically sustainable forms of living. Along the way, Bowers points to how even thinkers considered "reformists" contribute to ecologically unsustainable ways of thinking. What is being called for here is not simply the addition of environmental studies programs, or the add-on of "green" courses into the curriculum, but rather a fundamental change in the foundations, the very values, that our educational system strives to propagate.

Bowers argued that no one can exist independent of social and ecological relationships, and that the concept of personal autonomy has been championed at the expense of the environment for personal and corporate gain. Rolf Jucker, in his book Do We Know What We Are Doing, said: "Bowers points out that autonomy is an ideological construct of Western thinkers who did (and still do) not understand how thinking always reproduces even as it individualizes the taken-for-granted cultural patterns of thinking."

== Critical reception ==
In "Toward Awakening Consciousness" (included in Cultural Studies and Environmentalism: The Confluence of EcoJustice, Place-based (Science) Education, and Indigenous Knowledge Systems) Michael L. Bently referred to Bowers as "a pioneer in identifying 'root metaphors' that shape our thinking and behavior".

Patrick Slattery in Curriculum Development in the Postmodern Era wrote that "Chet Bowers, like Jacques Cousteau, worries about what we are doing to the physical environment. However, Bowers advances the dialogue by asserting that modern liberalism and Enlightenment rationality have produced an emphasis on individualism and reasoning that prevents ecological sensibilities and cooperative community efforts." Slattery also discussed Bowers's concept of "modern hubris" and aspects of Bowers's work.

Writing in the Encyclopedia of the Social and Cultural Foundations of Education Jeff Edmundson said: "Chet Bowers was an environmentalist before it became fashionable." Edmundson discussed Bowers's theory of "root metaphors", his opposition to the "assumptions of modernity", and the importance of the "commons".

== Published work ==
- Reforming Higher Education in an Era of Ecological Crisis and Growing Digital Insecurity (2016) Process Century Press ISBN 978-1-940447-23-0
- A Historical Detour that May Be Fatal: What We Can Learn from the Luddite's Community-Centered Approach to Technology (2016) Eco-Justice Press ISBN 978-1-945432-11-8
- A Critical Examination Of STEM: Issues and Challenges (2016) Routledge ISBN 978-1138659087
- Digital Detachment: How computer culture undermines democracy (2016) Routledge ISBN 978-1-138-18686-6
- An Ecological and Cultural Critique of the Common Core Curriculum (2015) New York: Peter Lang, ISBN 978-14331-2798-4
- The False Promises of the Digital Revolution: How Computers Transform Education, Work, and International development in Ways that Are Ecologically Unsustainable (2014) New York: Peter Lang, ISBN 9781433126130
- In the Grip of the Past: Educational Reforms that Address What Needs to be Conserved and What Needs to be Changed (2013) Eco-Justice Press ISBN 978-0-9891296-1-9
- The Way Forward: Educational Reforms that Focus on the Cultural Commons and the Linguistic roots of the Ecological Crisis (2012) Eco-Justice Press ISBN 978-0-9660370-6-7
- Educational Reforms for the 21st Century (2011) Eco-Justice Press ISBN 0-9660370-1-4
- University Reform in an Era of Global Warming (2011) Eco-Justice Press ISBN 0-9660370-4-9
- Perspectives on the Ideas of Gregory Bateson, Ecological Intelligence, and Educational Reforms (2011) Eco-Justice Press ISBN 0-9660370-0-6
- Revitalizing the Commons: Cultural and Educational Sites of Resistance and Affirmation (2006) New York: Peter Lang ISBN 0-7391-1334-8
- False Promises of Constructivist Theories of Learning: A Global and Ecological Critique (2005) New York: Peter Lang ISBN 0-8204788-49
- Rethinking Freire: Globalization and the Environmental Crisis (2004) Co-edited with Frederique Apffel-Marglin. Lawrence Erlbaum ISBN 9780805851144
- Mindful Conservatism: Rethinking the Ideological and Educational Basis of an Ecologically Sustainable Future (2003) Rowman & Littlefield ISBN 0-7425-3321-2
- Detras de la apariencia: hacia la descolonizacion de la educacion (2002) Proyecto Andino de Tecnologias Campesinas ISBN 9972-646-27-0
- Educating for Eco-Justice and Community (2001) University of Georgia Press ISBN 0-8203-2305-5
- Let Them Eat Data: How Computers Affect Education, Cultural Diversity and the Prospects of Ecological Sustainability (2000) University of Georgia Press ISBN 0-8203-2229-6 (translated into Japanese and Mandarin)
- The Culture of Denial: Why the Environmental Movement Needs a Strategy for Reforming Universities and Public Schools (1997) State University of New York Press ISBN 0-7914-3463-X
- Educating for an Ecologically Sustainable Culture: Rethinking Moral Education, Creativity, Intelligence and other Modern Orthodoxies (1995) State University of New York Press ISBN 07914-2497-9
- Critical Essays on Education, Modernity, and the Recovery of the Ecological Imperative (1993) New York: Teachers College Press ISBN 9780807732441
- Education, Cultural Myths, and the Ecological Crisis: Toward Deep Changes (1993) State University of New York Press ISBN 0-7914-1255-5
- The Cultural Dimensions of Educational Computing: Understanding the Non-Neutrality of Technology (1988) New York: Teachers College Press ISBN 978-0807729236
- The Promise of Theory: Education and the Politics of Cultural Change (1984) New York: Teachers College Press
