= Peter Bowers =

Peter Bowers may refer to:

- Peter M. Bowers (1918–2003), American aviation journalist, historian and aeronautical engineer
- Peter Bowers (Australian journalist) (1930–2010), Australian journalist
