= Zonm Lib =

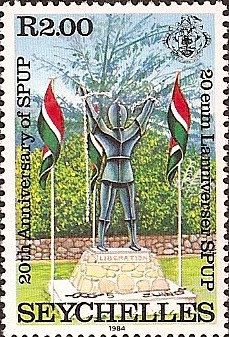
Zonm Lib on stamp commemorating the 20th anniversary of the SPUP

Zonm Lib (Free Men) is a statue in Seychelles which stood as the Liberty Monument of the country from 1978 to 2014.

== History ==
The statue was erected in 1978. The first line of the refrain of the national anthem adopted the same year, Fyer Seselwa, was "Debout, Zome Lib!" (Stand up free men).

In 2014, it was moved in front of the Maison du Peuple in 2014. It started to become a symbol of the unresolved issues surrounding the independence of the country, sparking a controversy about its historic meaning today.

== Description ==
From 1978 to 2014, it was located in front of the Seychelles Communication Center (ICCS), where Independence Day is celebrated every year.

The metal statue depicts a slave, fists in the air, free of his chains, celebrating the liberation from oppression.

The statue was on the SCR 10 (Seychellois rupee) bills of the country. It was issued in 1989 and demonetized in 2000.

== See also ==
- Emancipation Statue in Barbados
