= John Leech (caricaturist) =

English caricaturist and illustrator (1817–1864)

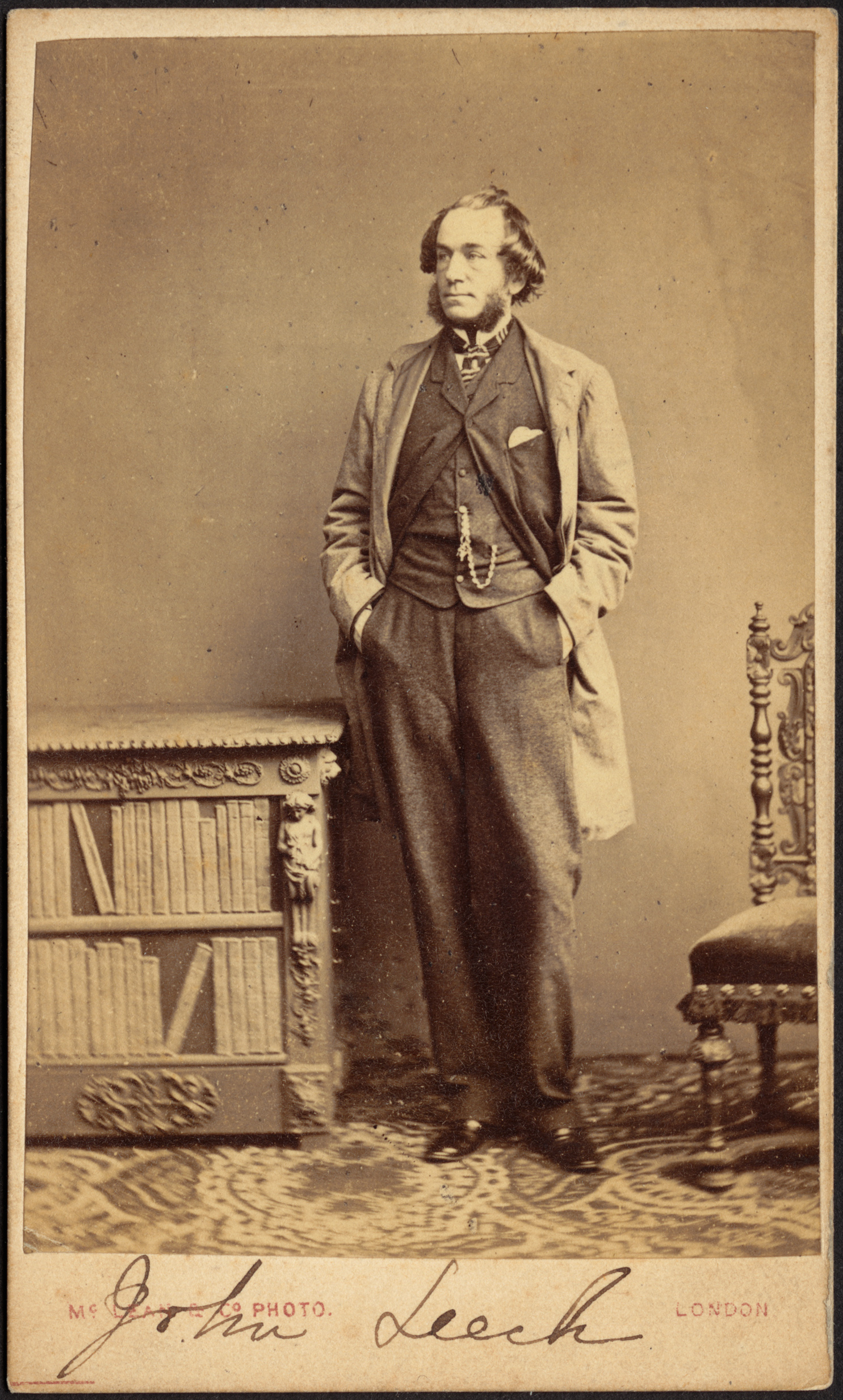
- Leech's carte de visite
- Born: 29 August 1817; London, England
- Died: 29 October 1864 (aged 47); London, England
- Occupations: Caricaturist and illustrator

John Leech (29 August 1817 – 29 October 1864) was a British caricaturist and illustrator. He was best known for his work for Punch, a humorous magazine for a broad middle-class audience, combining verbal and graphic political satire with light social comedy. Leech's critical yet humorous cartoons on the Crimean War helped shape public attitudes toward heroism, warfare, and Britons' role in the world.

Leech also enjoys fame as the first illustrator of Charles Dickens' 1843 novella A Christmas Carol. He was furthermore a pioneer in comics, creating the recurring character Mr. Briggs and some sequential illustrated gags.

His work has always been known very largely through printed reproductions, and was created for this purpose, but critics have always complained that the relatively crude reproductive processes of his day do not show the quality of his delicate drawing.

== Early life ==
John Leech was born in London. His father, a native of Ireland, was the landlord of the London Coffee House on Ludgate Hill, "a man", on the testimony of those who knew him, "of fine culture, a profound Shakespearian, and a thorough gentleman." His mother was descended from the family of Richard Bentley. Like his father. Leech was skillful at drawing with a pencil, which he began doing at a very early age. When he was only three, he was discovered by John Flaxman, who was visiting, seated on his mother's knee, drawing with much gravity. The sculptor admired his sketch, adding, "Do not let him be cramped with lessons in drawing; let his genius follow its own bent; he will astonish the world"—advice which was followed. A mail-coach, done when he was six years old, is already full of surprising vigour and variety in its galloping horses. Leech was educated at Charterhouse School, where William Makepeace Thackeray, his lifelong friend, was a fellow pupil, and at sixteen he began to study for the medical profession at St Bartholomew's Hospital, where he won praise for the accuracy and beauty of his anatomical drawings. He was then placed under a Mr Whittle, an eccentric practitioner, the original of "Rawkins" in Albert Smith's Adventures of Mr Ledbury, and afterwards under John Cockle; but gradually he drifted into the artistic profession. His nickname also being "Blicky" stuck with him during his life, and he used that name to sign some of his works.

== Artistic career ==
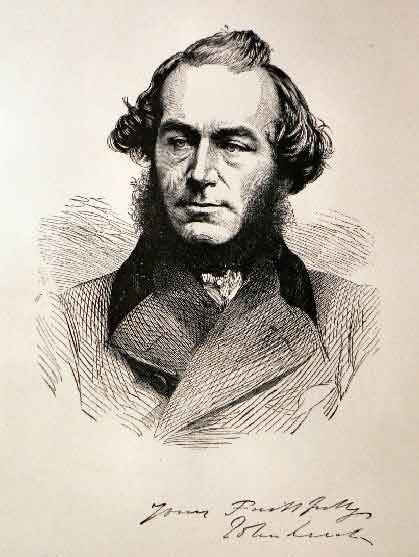
Leech engraving featured in Punch

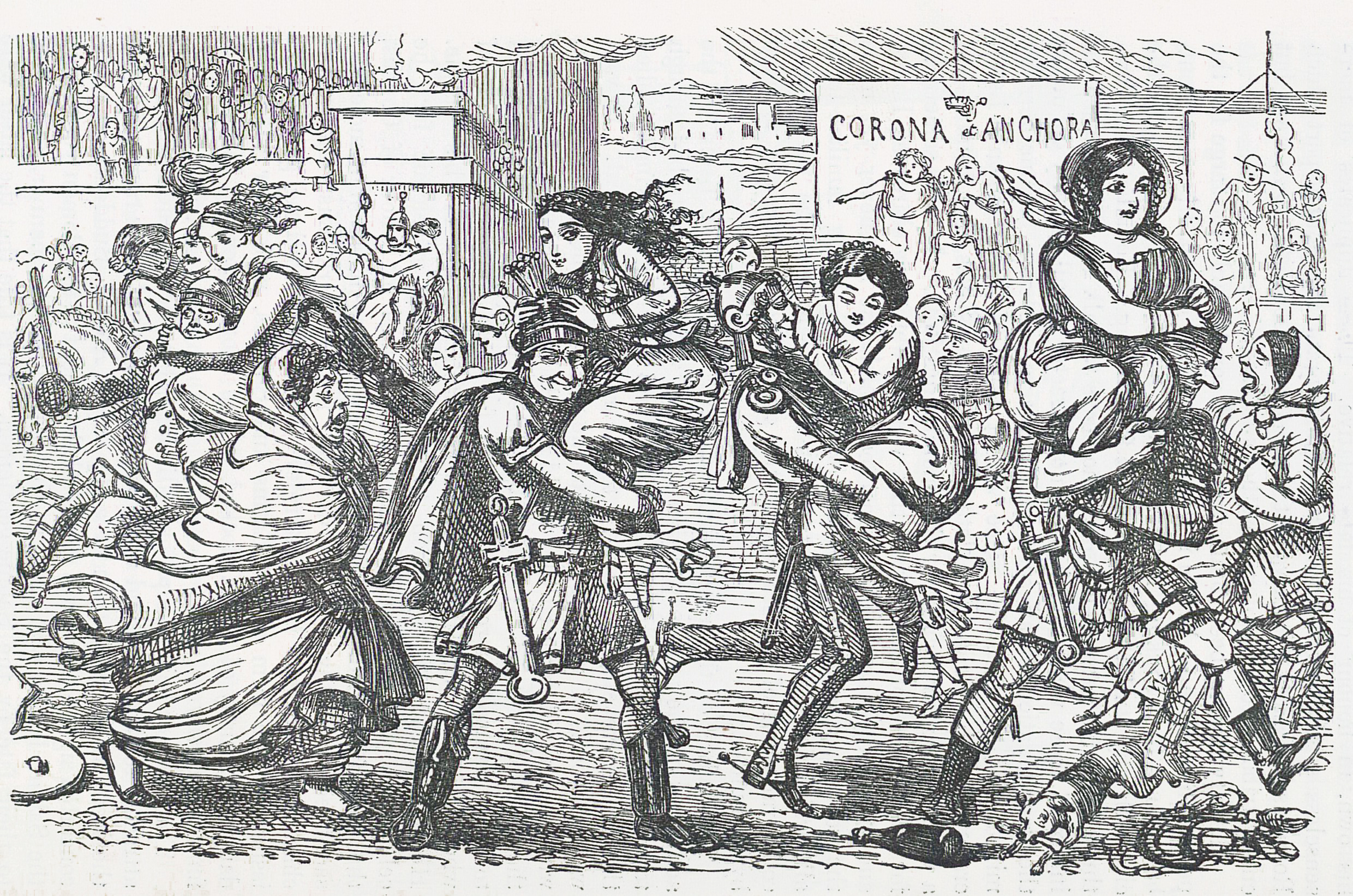
A scene from Leech's Comic History of Rome, depicting the Rape of the Sabine Women. The women are portrayed in Victorian costume being carried off from the "Corona et Ancora" ("Crown and Anchor", a common English pub sign in seafaring towns.)

He was eighteen when his first designs were published, a quarto of four pages, entitled Etchings and Sketchings by A. Pen, Esq., comic character studies from the London streets. Then he drew some political lithographs, did rough sketches for Bell's Life, produced a popular parody on Mulready's postal envelope, and, on the death of Dickens illustrator Robert Seymour in 1836, unsuccessfully submitted his renderings to illustrate The Pickwick Papers.

In 1840 Leech began his contributions to the magazines with a series of etchings in Bentley's Miscellany, where George Cruikshank had published his plates to Jack Sheppard and Oliver Twist, and was illustrating Guy Fawkes in feebler fashion.

In company with the elder master Leech designed for the Ingoldsby Legends and Stanley Thorn, and until 1847 produced many independent series of etchings. These were not his best work; their technique is imperfect and we never feel that they express the artist's individuality, the Richard Savage plates, for instance, being strongly reminiscent of Cruikshank, and The Dance at Stamford Hall of Hablot Browne.

In 1845 Leech illustrated St Giles and St James in Douglas William Jerrold's new Shilling Magazine, with plates more vigorous and accomplished than those in Bentley, but it is in subjects of a somewhat later date, and especially in those lightly etched and meant to be printed with colour, that we see the artist's best powers with the needle and acid.

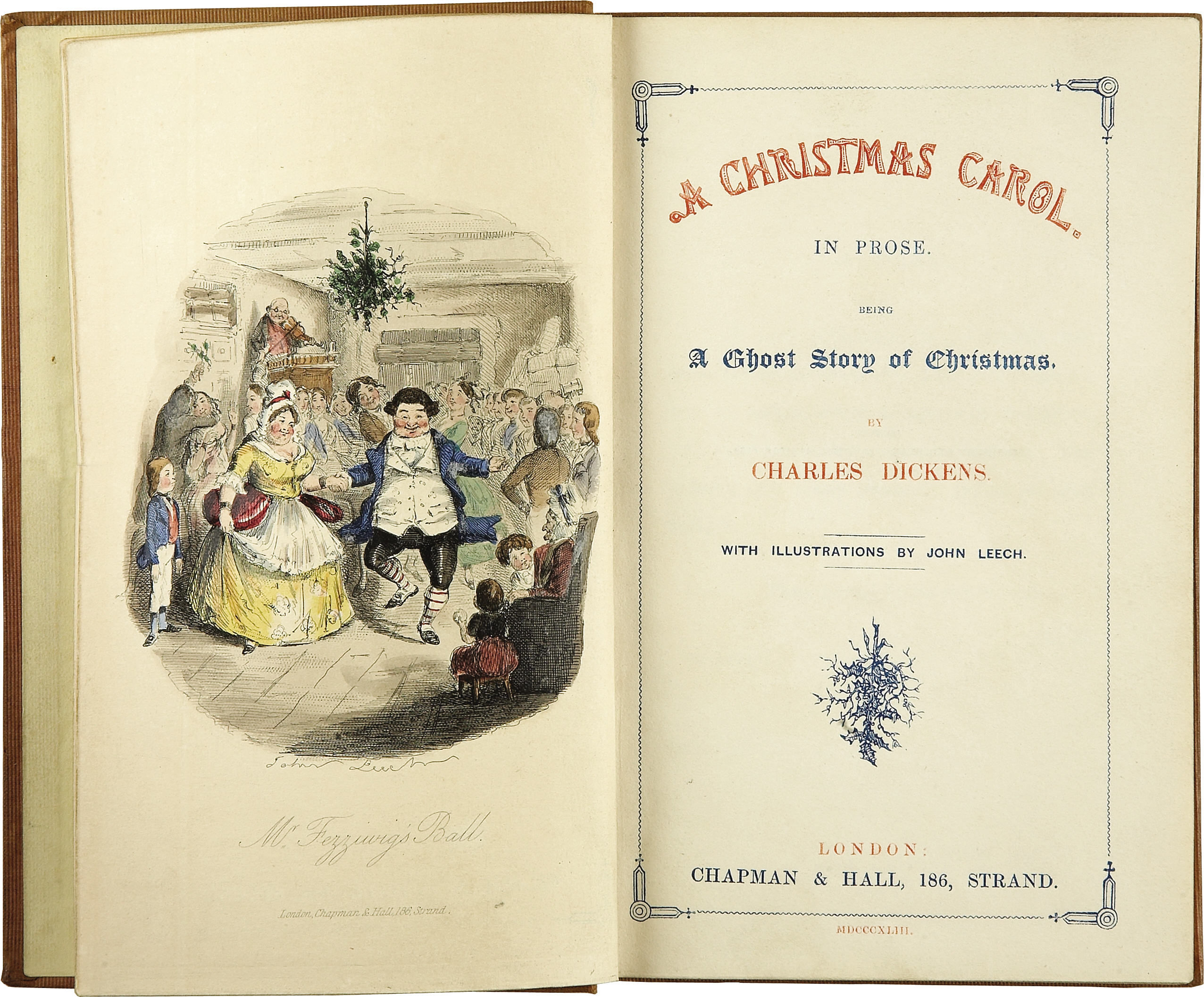
Frontispiece of Dickens' A Christmas Carol, first edition 1843, illustrated by Leech

Among his designs are four plates to Charles Dickens's A Christmas Carol (1843), the etchings in the Comic History of England (1847–1848), and the illustrations to The Comic History of Rome (1851)—which last, particularly in its minor woodcuts, shows touches such as the faces that rise from the surging water in Cloelia and her Companions Escaping from the Etruscan Camp.

Among his other etchings are those in Young Master Troublesome or Master Jacky's Holidays, and the frontispiece to Hints on Life, or How to Rise in Society (1845)—a series of minute subjects linked gracefully together by coils of smoke, illustrating the various ranks and conditions of men, one of them—the doctor by his patient's bedside—almost equalling in vivacity and precision the best of Cruikshank's similar scenes.

Then in the 1850s come the numerous etchings of sporting scenes, contributed, together with woodcuts, to the Handley Cross novels by Robert Smith Surtees.

== Lithographic work ==
Leech's lithographic work includes the 1841 Portraits of the Children of the Mobility, an important series dealing with the humorous and pathetic aspects of London street "Arabs", which were afterwards so often and so effectively to employ the artist's pencil. Amid all the squalor which they depict, they are full of individual beauties in the delicate or touching expression of a face, in the graceful turn of a limb. The book is scarce in its original form, but in 1875 two reproductions of the outline sketches for the designs were published—a lithographic issue of the whole series, and a finer photographic transcript of six of the subjects, which is more valuable than even the finished illustrations of 1841, in which the added light and shade is frequently spotty and ineffective, arid the lining itself has not the freedom which we find in some of Leech's other lithographs, notably in the fly leaves, published at the Punch office, and in the inimitable subject of the nuptial couch of the Caudles, which also appeared, in woodcut form, as a political cartoon, with Mrs Caudle, personated by Brougham, disturbing by untimely loquacity the slumbers of the lord chancellor, whose haggard cheek rests on the woolsack for pillow.

== Wood engraving ==
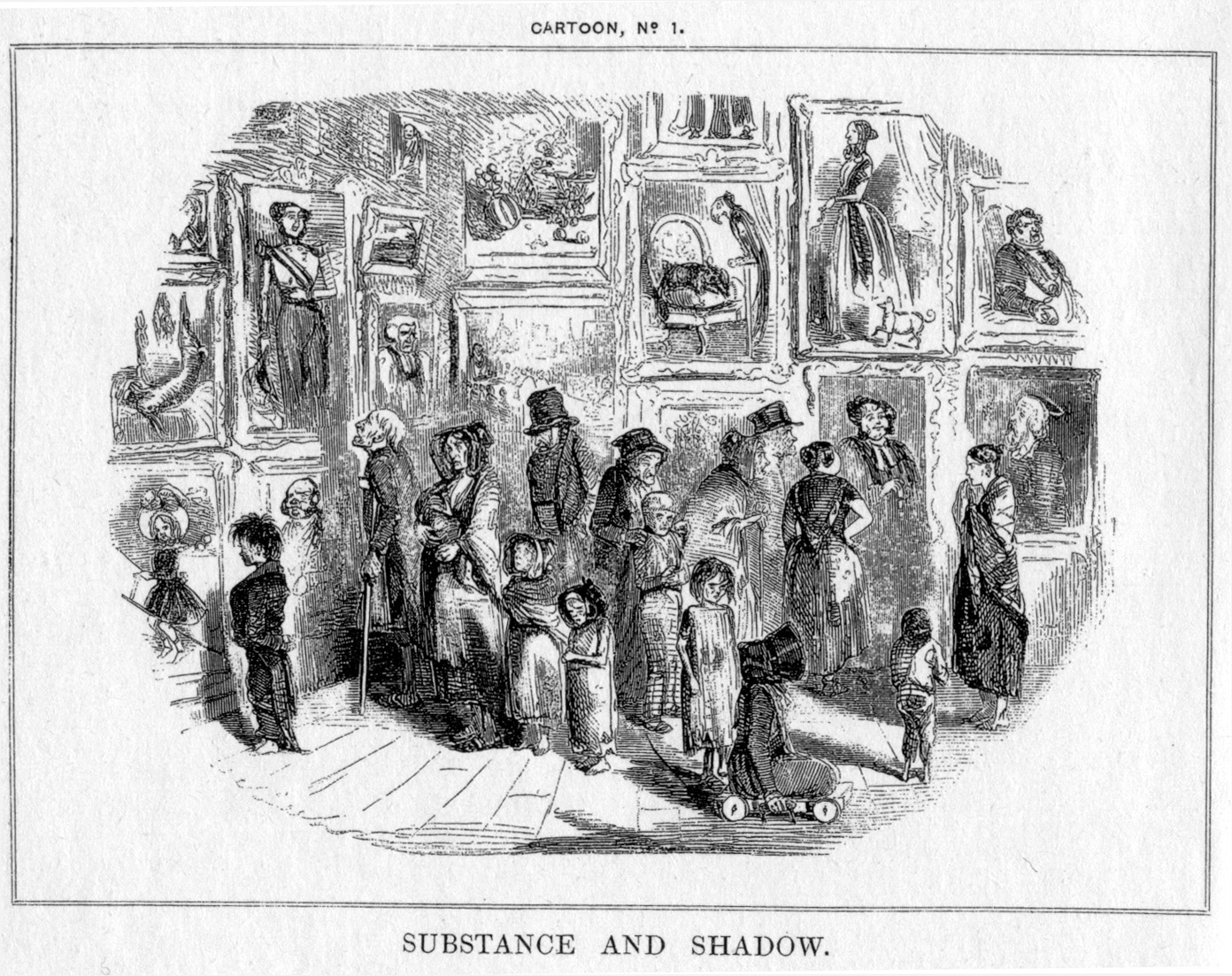
Substance and Shadow, published in Punch, 1843, the first use of the word cartoon to refer to a satirical drawing

It was in work for the wood-engravers that Leech was most prolific and individual. Among the earlier of such designs are the illustrations to the Comic English and Latin Grammars (1840), to Written Caricatures (1841), to Hood's Comic Annual, (1842), and to Albert Smith's Wassail Bowl (1843), subjects mainly of a small vignette size, transcribed with the best skill of such woodcutters as Orrin Smith, and not, like the larger and later Punch illustrations, cut at speed by several engravers working at once on the subdivided block.

It was in 1841 that Leech's connection with Punch began, a connection which subsisted until his death, and resulted in the production of the best-known and most admirable of his designs. His first contribution appeared in the issue of 7 August, a full-page illustration—entitled Foreign Affairs of character studies from the neighbourhood of Leicester Square. His cartoons deal at first mainly with social subjects, and are rough and imperfect in execution, but gradually their method gains in power and their subjects become more distinctly political, and by 1849 the artist is strong enough to produce the splendidly humorous national personification which appears in Disraeli Measuring the British Lion.

About 1845 we have the first of that long series of half-page and quarter-page pictures of life and manners, executed with a hand as gentle as it was skilful, containing, as Ruskin has said, "admittedly the finest definition and natural history of the classes of our society, the kindest and subtlest analysis of its foibles, the tenderest flattery of its pretty and well-bred ways", which had yet appeared.

In addition to his work for the weekly issue of Punch, Leech contributed largely to the Punch almanacks and pocket-books, from Once a Week between 1859 and 1862, to The Illustrated London News, where some of his largest and best sporting scenes appeared, and to innumerable novels and miscellaneous volumes besides, of which it is only necessary to specify A Little Tour in Ireland (1859). This last piece is noticeable as showing the artist's treatment of pure landscape, though it also contains some of his daintiest figure pieces, like that of the wind-blown girl, standing on the summit of a pedestal, with the swifts darting around her and the breadth of sea beyond.

== Public exhibition ==
In 1862 Leech appealed to the public with an exhibition of some of the most remarkable of his Punch drawings. These were enlarged by a mechanical process, and coloured in oils by the artist himself, with the assistance and under the direction of his friend John Everett Millais. Millais had earlier painted a portrait of a child reading Leech's comic book Mr Briggs' Sporting Tour, itself said to have been founded on Leech's own visits to Millais, whose favorite shooting and fishing grounds are reproduced in a great number of the drawings.

== Character ==
Leech was a rapid and indefatigable worker. Samuel Hole said he observed the artist produce three finished drawings on the wood, designed, traced, and rectified, "without much effort as it seemed, between breakfast and dinner". The best technical qualities of Leech's art, his precision and vivacity in the use of the line, are seen most clearly in the first sketches for his woodcuts, and in the more finished drawings made on tracing paper from these first outlines, before the chiaroscuro was added and the designs were transcribed by the engraver. Turning to the mental qualities of his art, it would be a mistaken criticism which ranked him as a comic draughtsman. Like Hogarth he was a true humorist, a student of human life, though he observed humanity mainly in its whimsical aspects,

Hitting all he saw with shafts
With gentle satire, kin to charity,
That harmed not.

The earnestness and gravity of moral purpose which is so constant a note in the work of Hogarth is indeed far less characteristic of Leech, but there are touches of pathos and of tragedy in such of the Punch designs as the Poor Man's Friend (1845), and General Février turned Traitor (1855), and in The Queen of the Arena in the first volume of Once a Week, which are sufficient to prove that more solemn powers, for which his daily work afforded no scope, lay dormant in their artist.

The purity and manliness of Leech's own character are impressed on his art. We find in it little of the exaggeration and grotesqueness, and none of the fierce political enthusiasm, of which the designs of James Gillray are so full. Compared with that of his great contemporary, George Cruikshank, his work is restricted both in compass of subject and in artistic dexterity.

== In popular culture ==
Leech was played by Simon Callow in the 2017 film The Man Who Invented Christmas which depicts the 1843 writing and production of Dickens' A Christmas Carol.

== Death ==
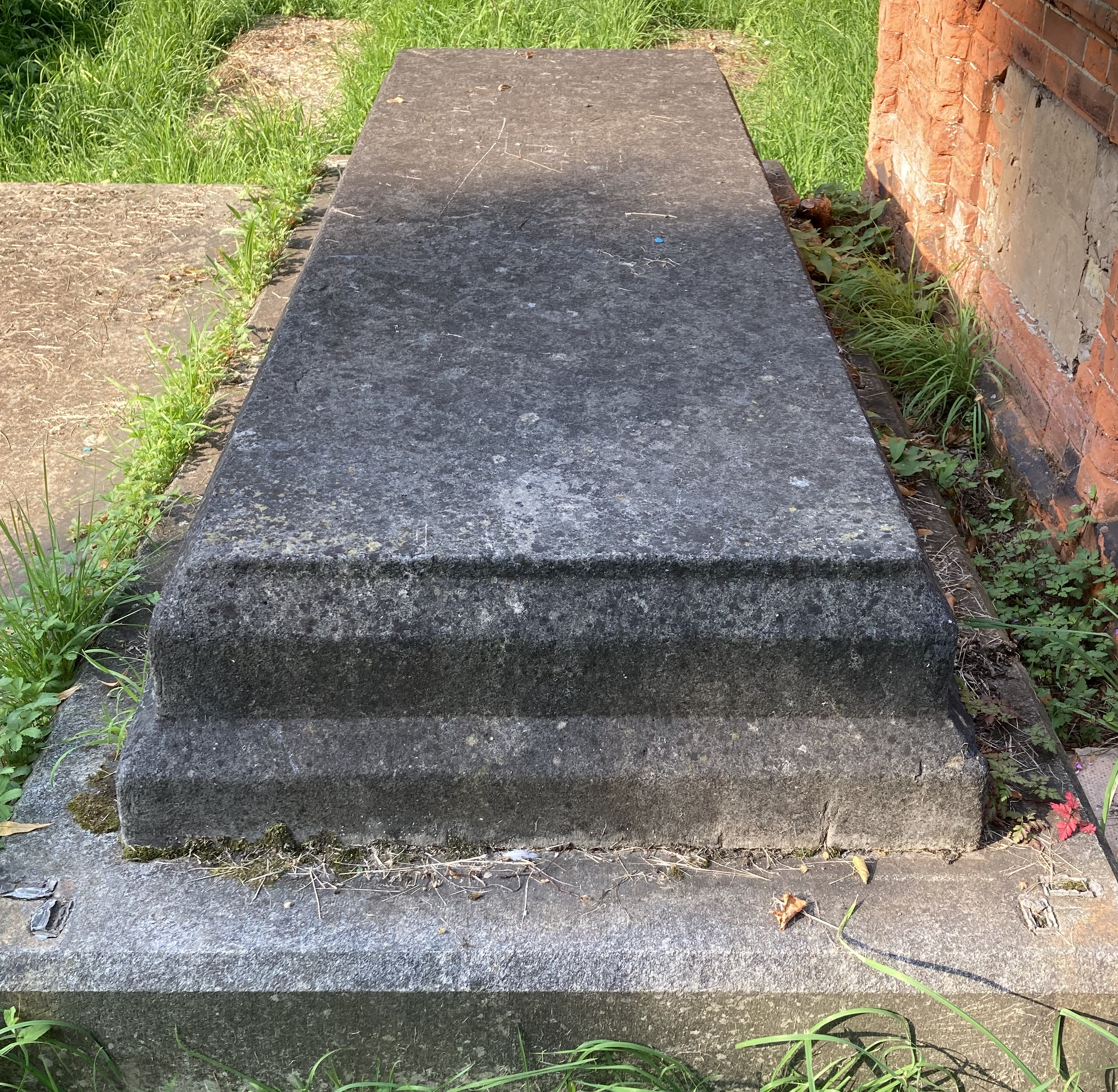
Grave of John Leech in Kensal Green Cemetery

Leech died at his home in London on 29 October 1864 and was buried in Kensal Green Cemetery.

== Gallery ==
A Christmas Carol by Charles Dickens

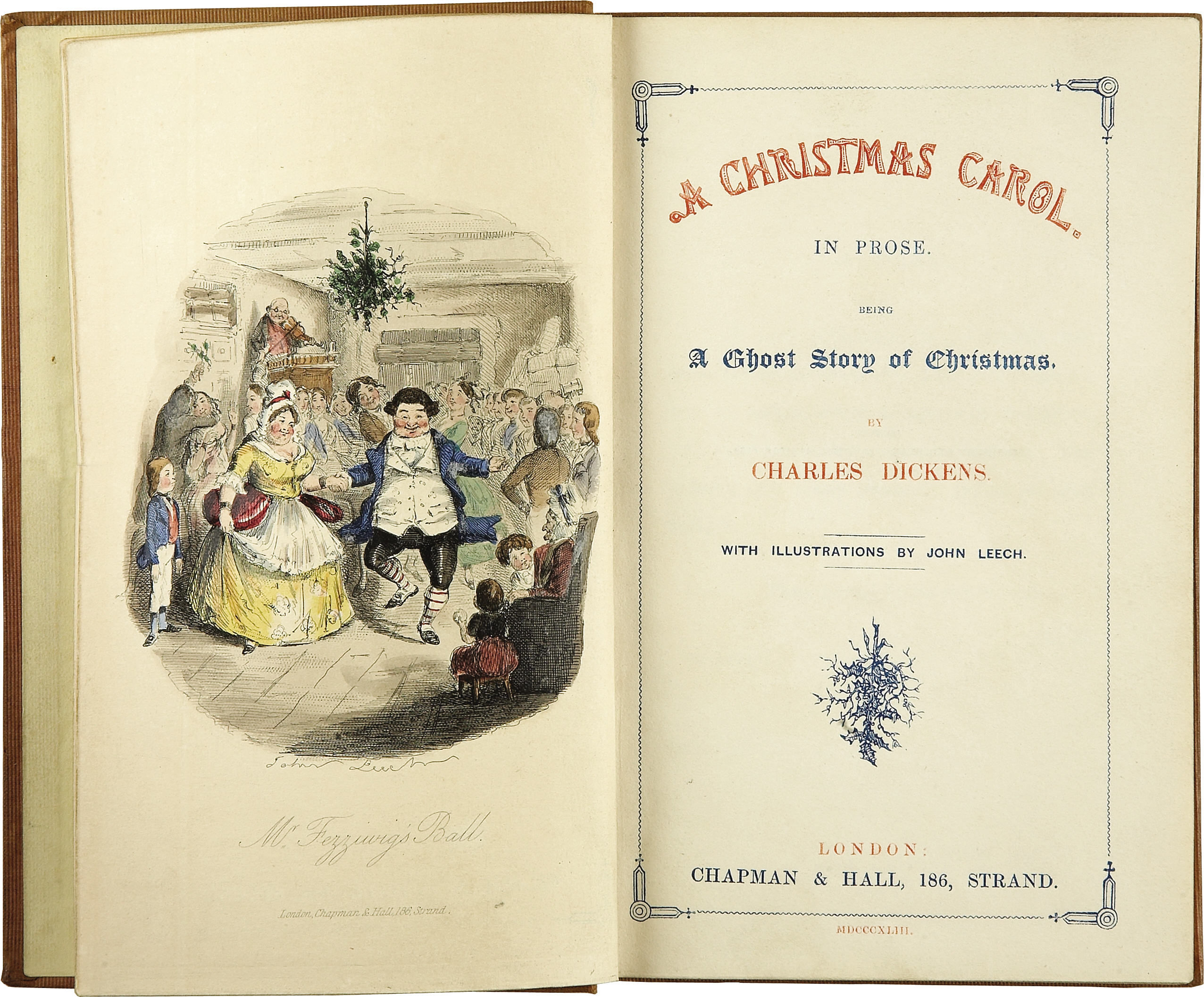
First page of 1843 first edition of A Christmas Carol by Charles Dickens

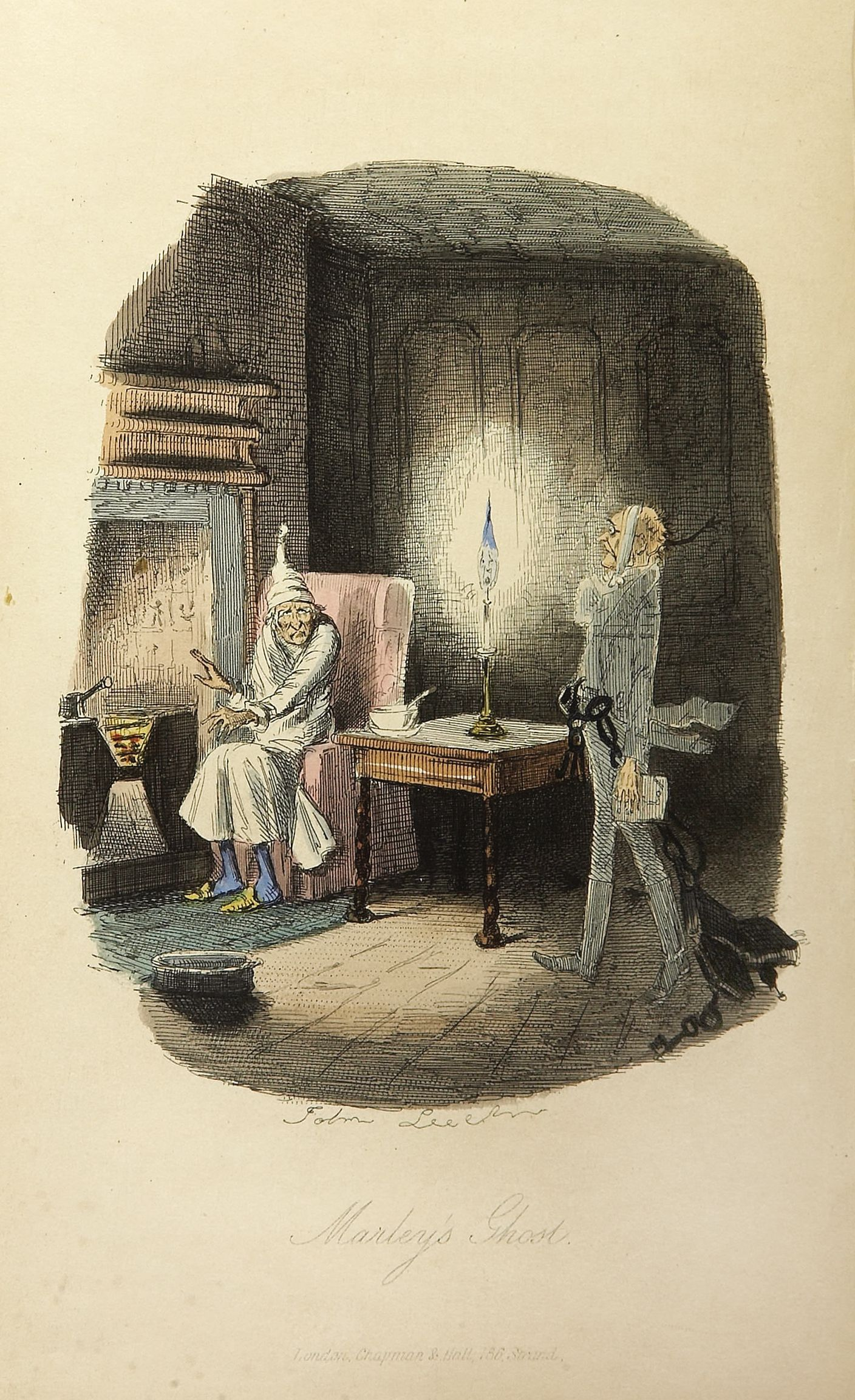
Jacob Marley's Ghost

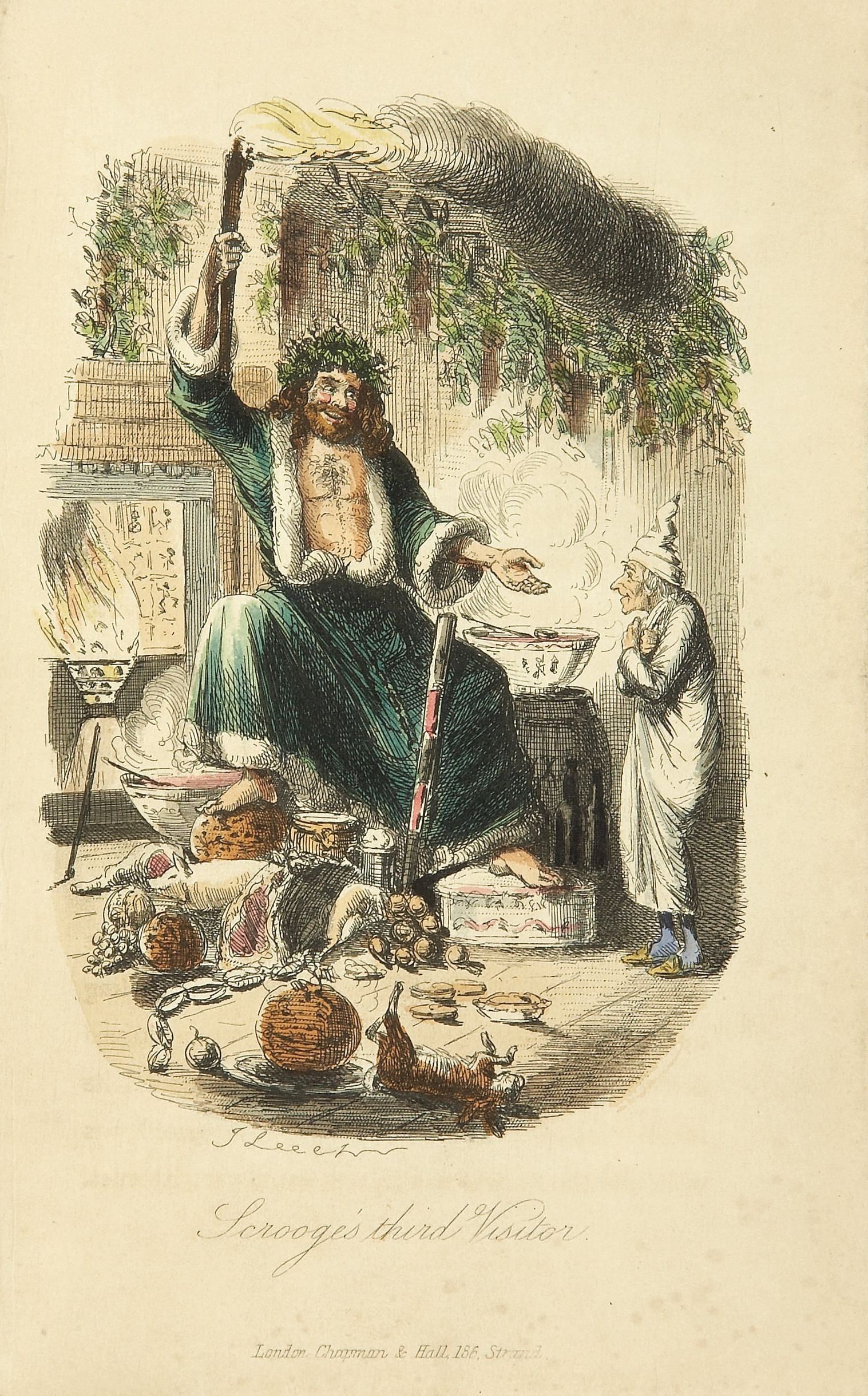
The Ghost of Christmas Present

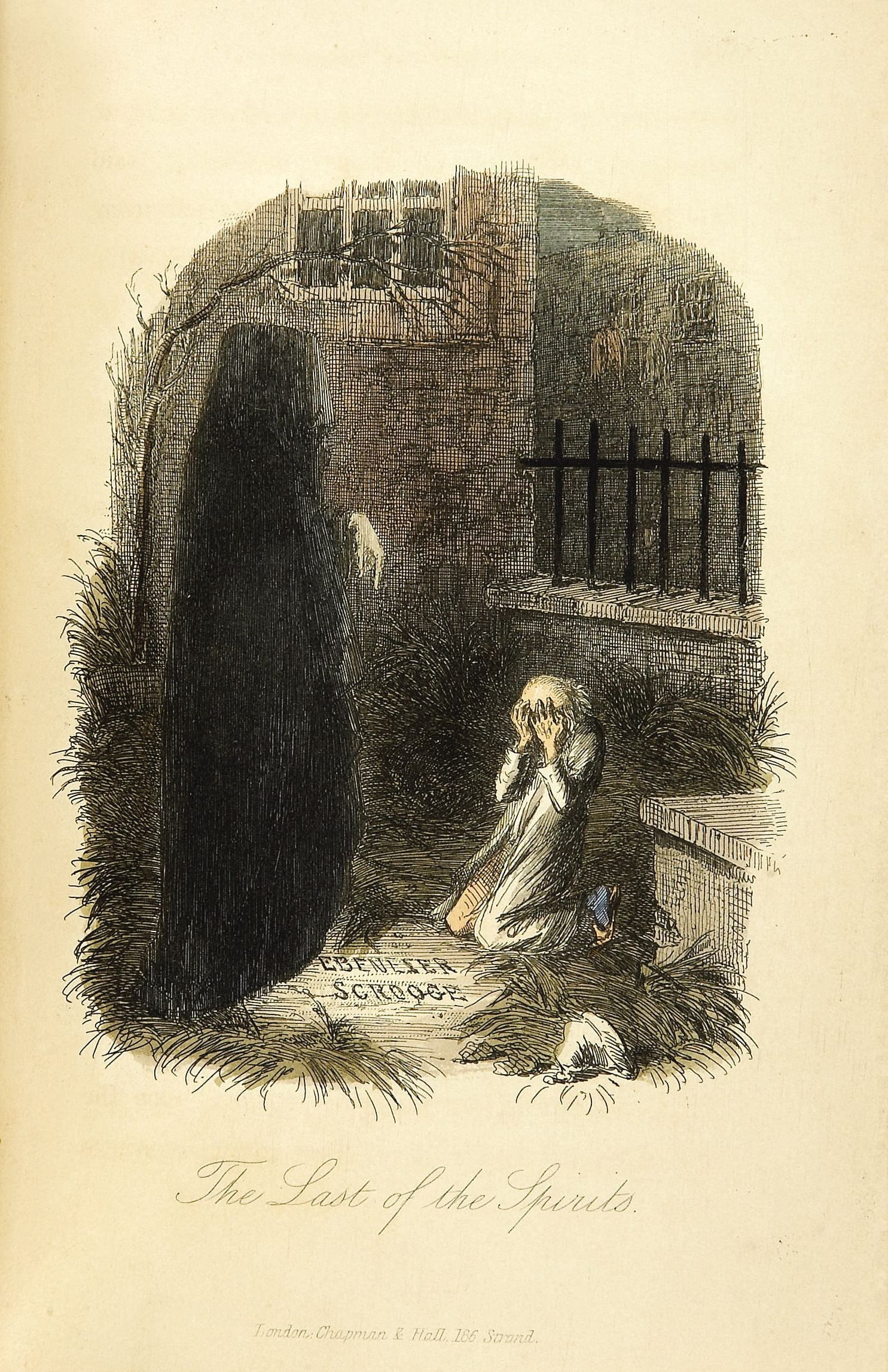
Ghost of Christmas Yet to Come
The Comic History of Rome by Gilbert Abbott à Beckett

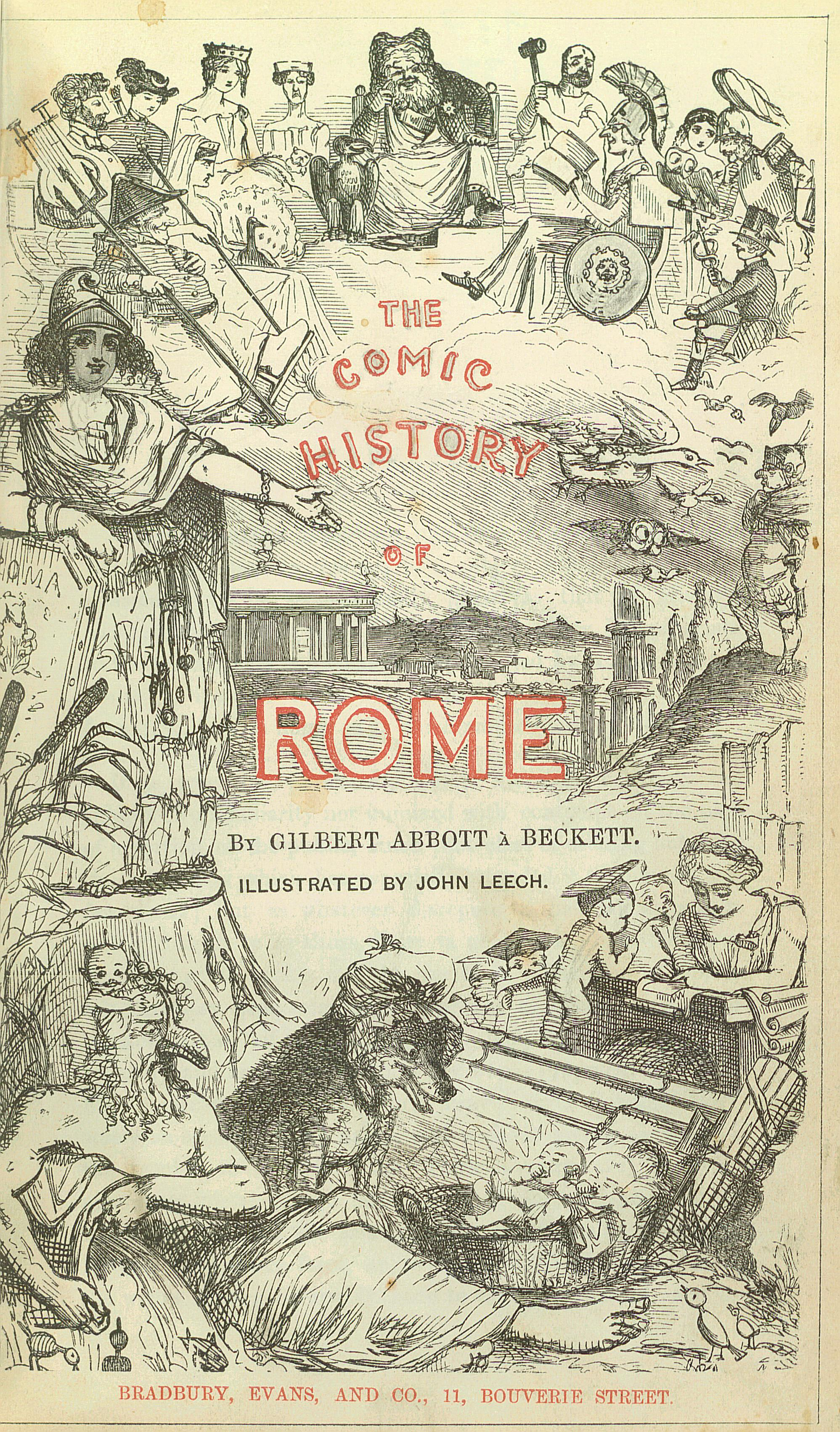
Title page of The Comic History of Rome

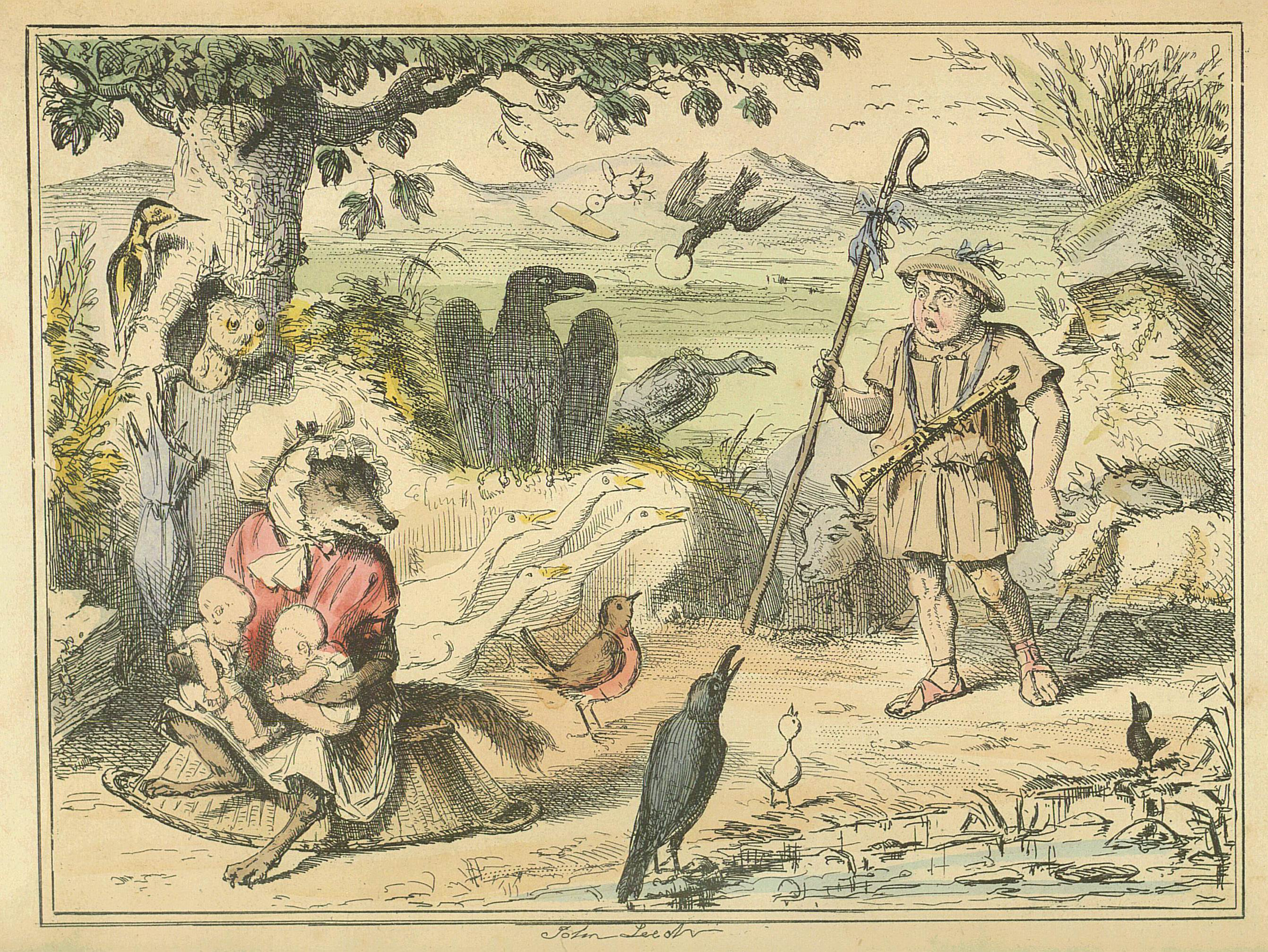
Romulus and Remus discovered by a gentle Shepherd

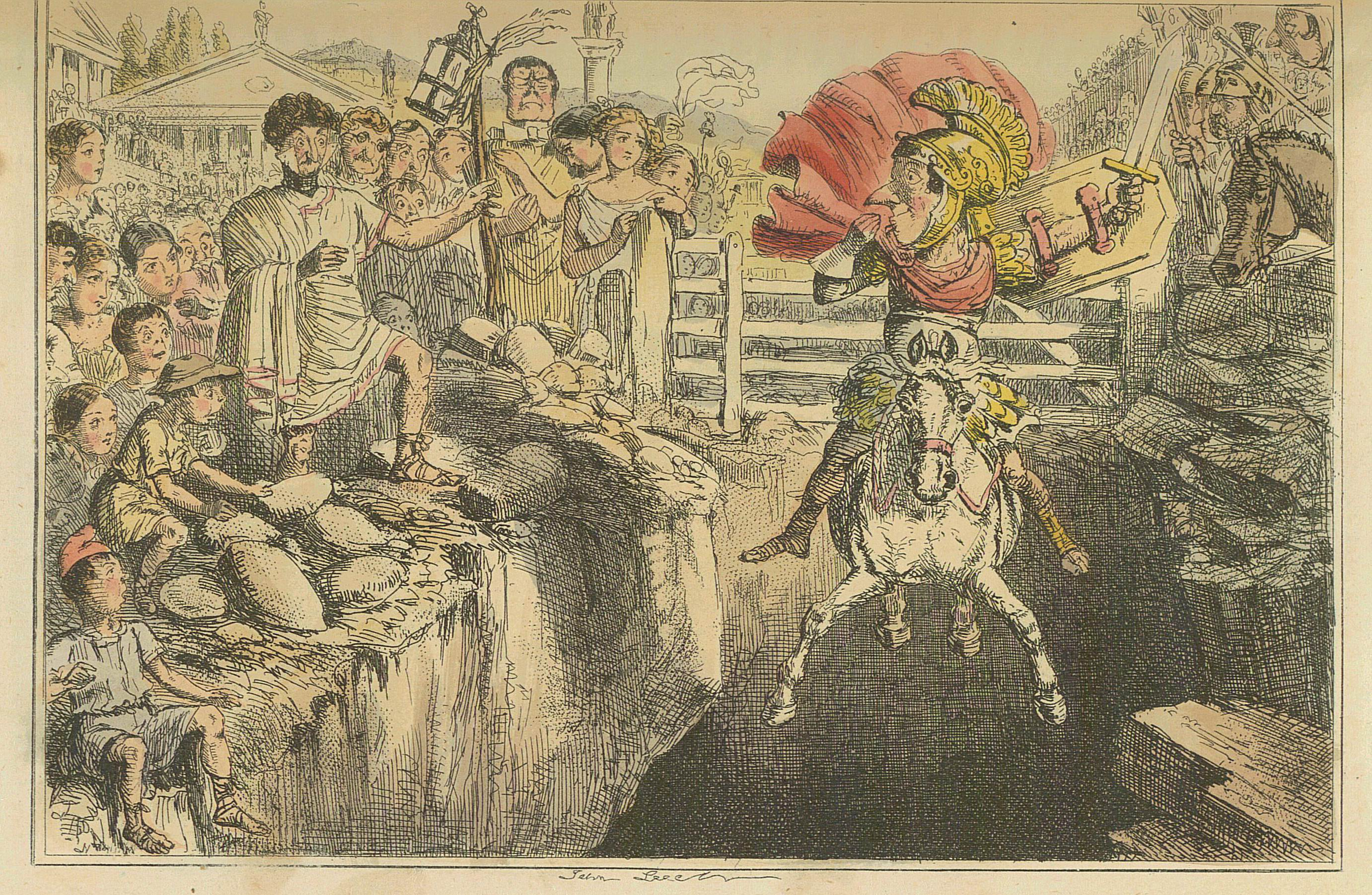
Marcus Curtius leaping into the Gulf

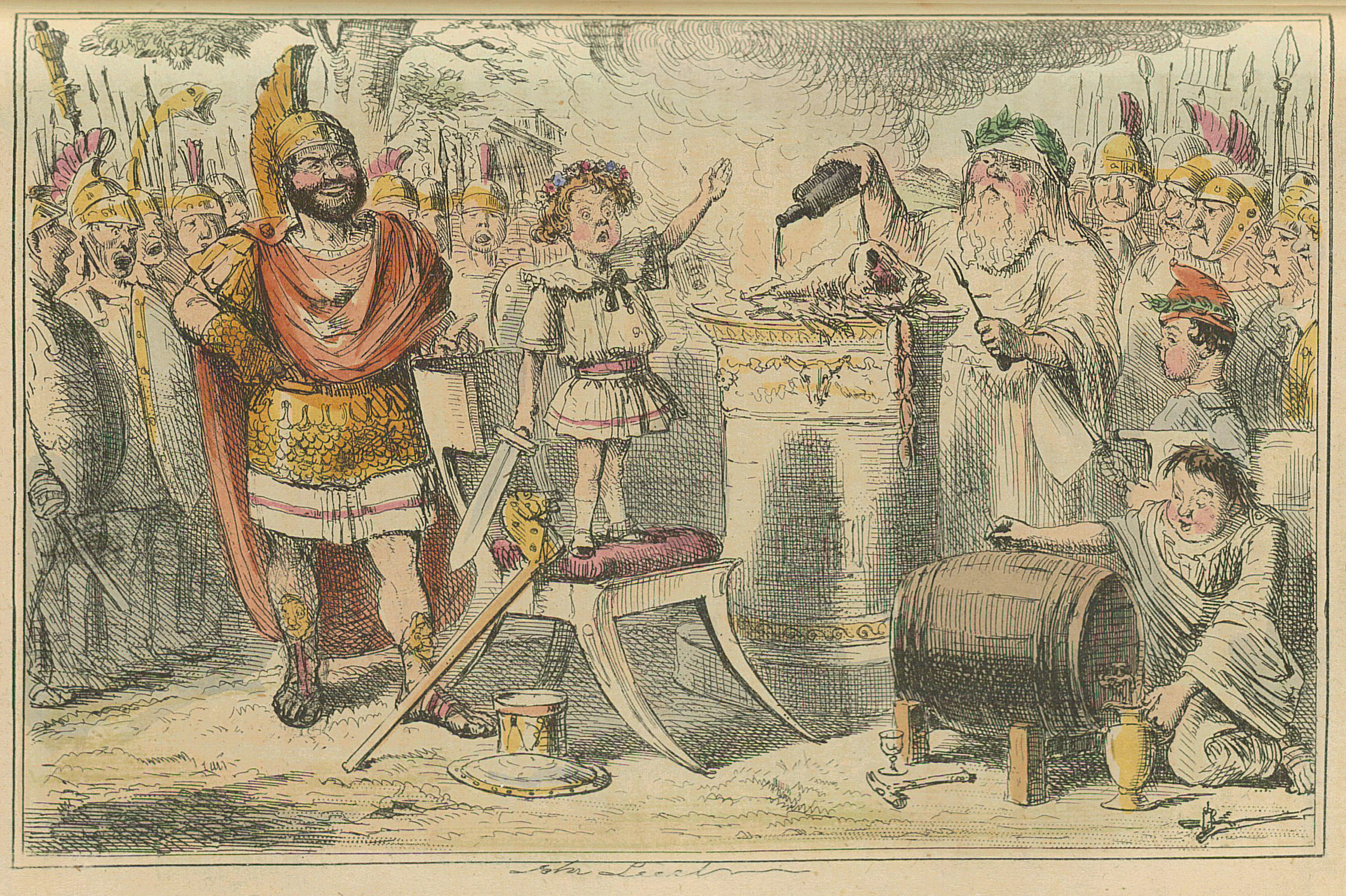
Hannibal swears eternal hatred to the Romans as a child.

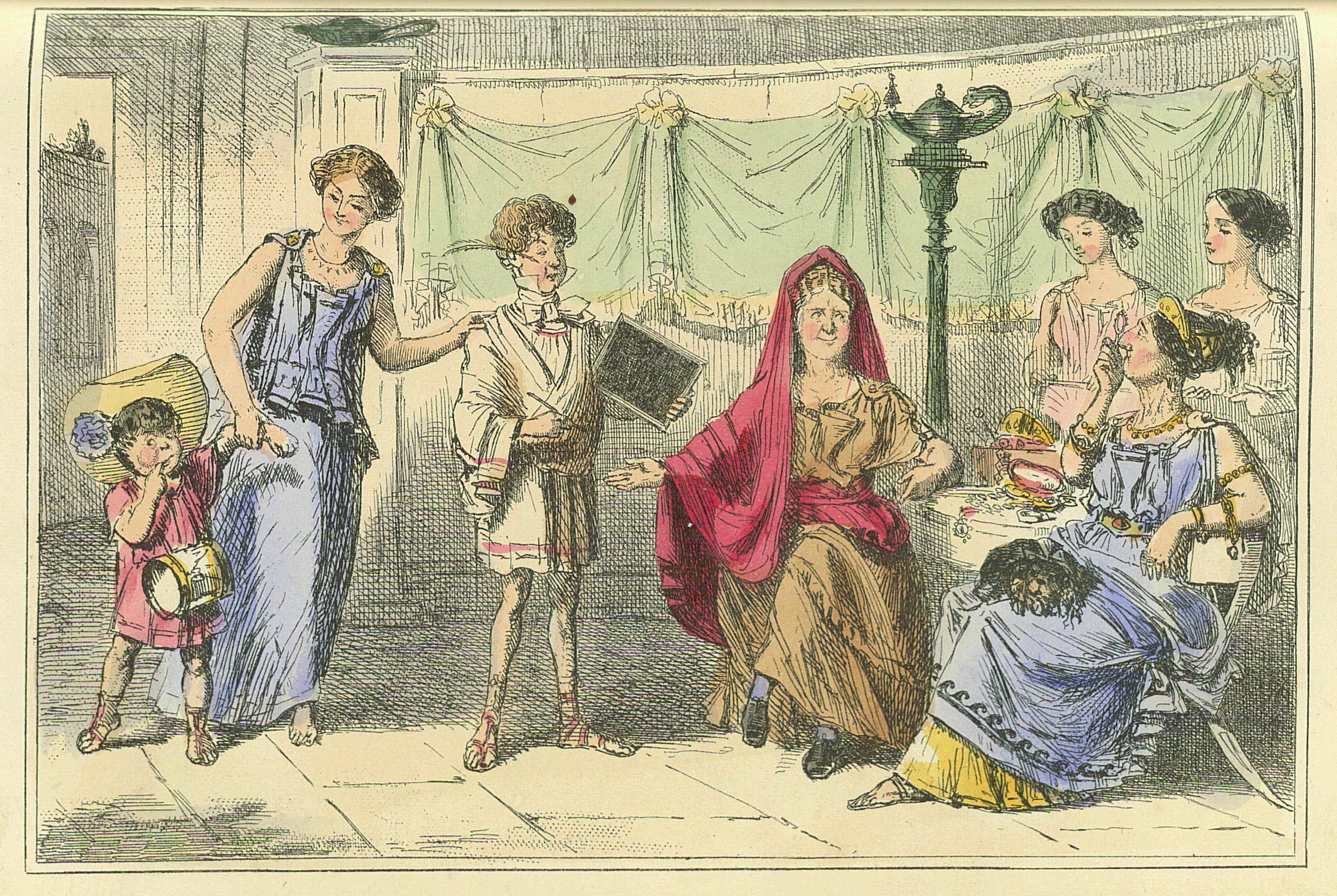
Cornelia Africana, mother of the Gracchi
Other

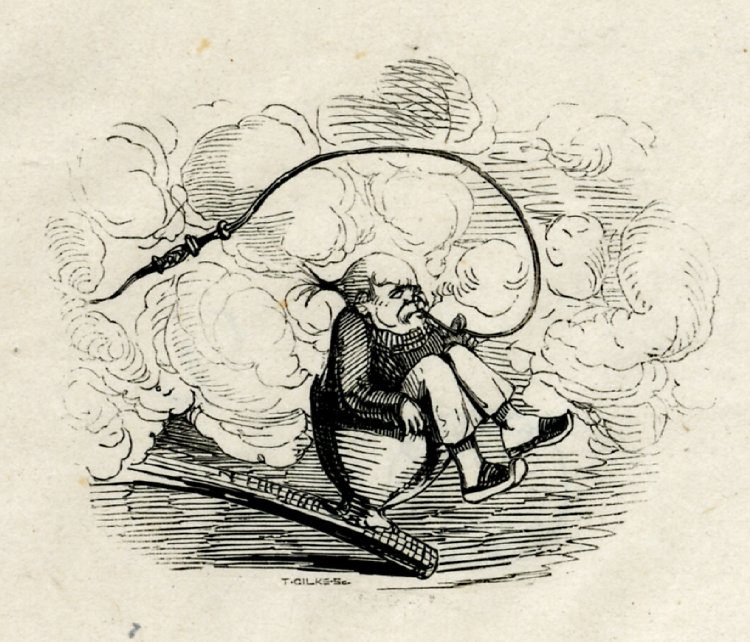
The end of opium-smoking, 1848

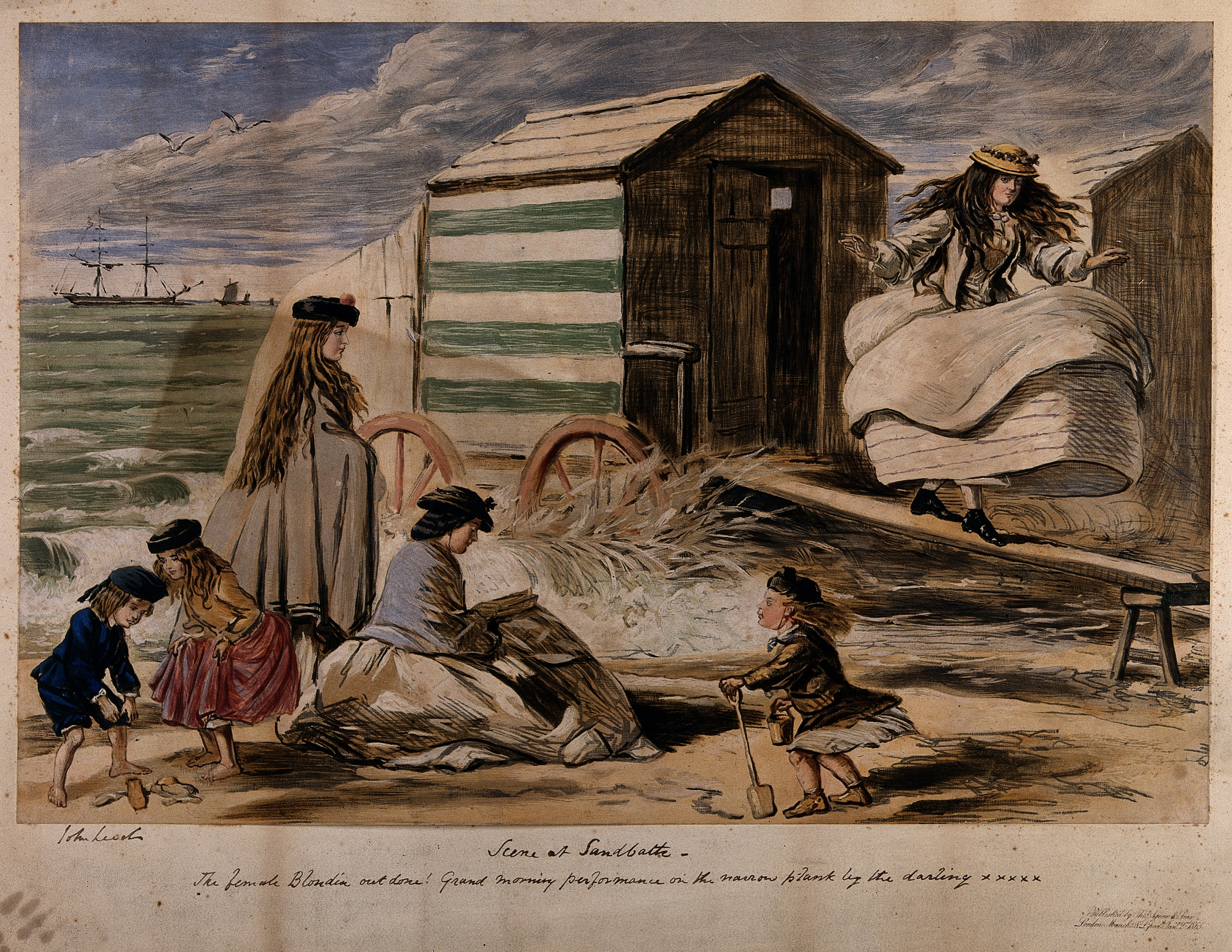
Scene at Sandbath, 1865

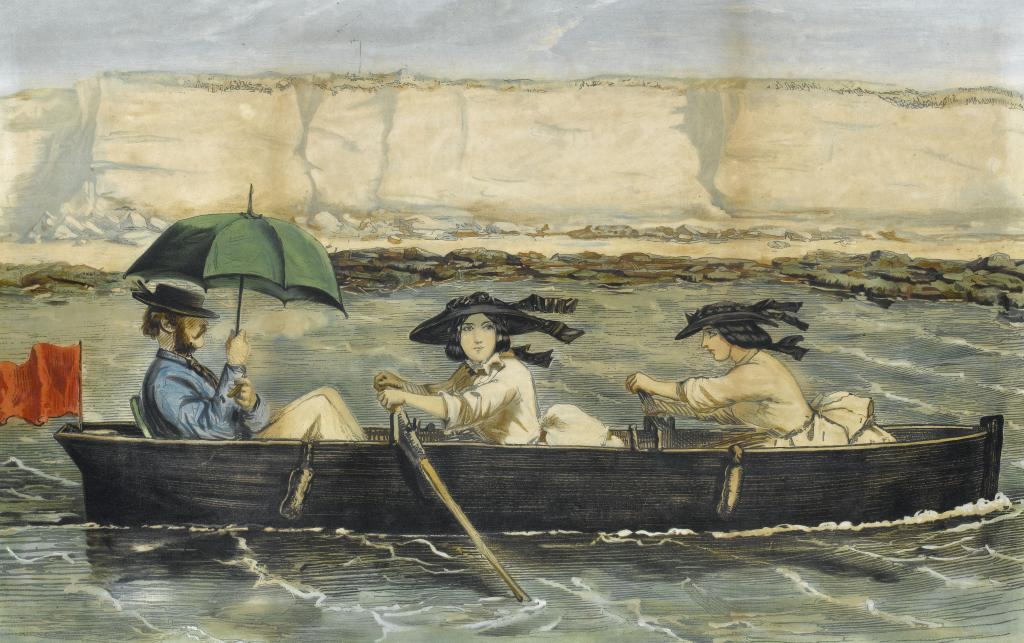
Two Ladies and a Gentleman in a Rowboat

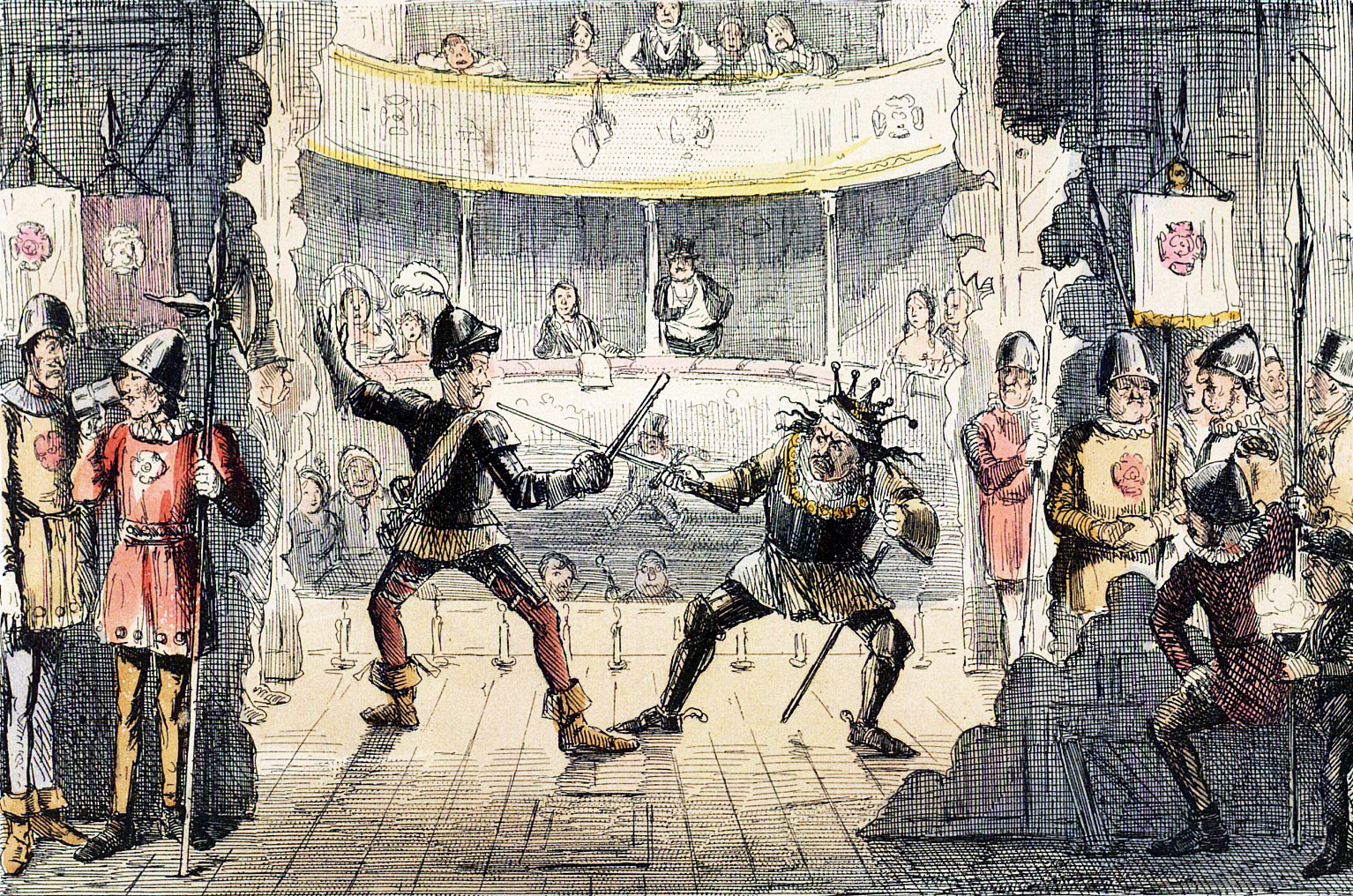
The Battle of Bosworth Field, a Scene in the Great Drama of History, illustrated by John Leech for Gilbert Abbott à Beckett, mocking the Victorian attitude towards history

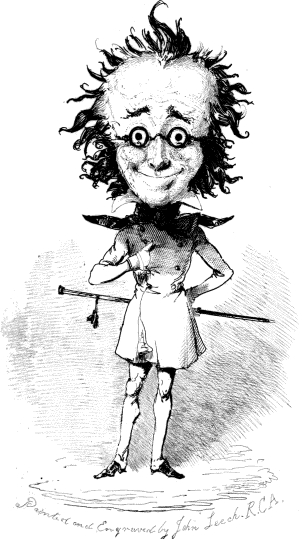
John Leech, a cartoon of himself – frontispiece from Leech's comic Latin grammar, 1840
