= Stephen C. Bowers =

American politician

Stephen C. Bowers was an American politician. He served in the California legislature and during the American Civil War he served in the Army of the Confederate States of America.
