= Chris Bowers (disambiguation) =

Chris Bowers (born 1974) is an American blogger with OpenLeft.

Chris or Christopher Bowers may also refer to:

- Christopher Bowers (canoeist) (born 1998), British slalom canoeist
- Chris Bowers, actor in American TV series Rescue Me and Bionic Woman
- Chris Bowers (Wealden), Liberal Democrat candidate for Wealden, England

== See also ==
- Kris Bowers (born 1989), American composer and pianist
- Christopher Bowers-Broadbent (born 1945), English organist and composer
