= George Newell Bowers =

American painter

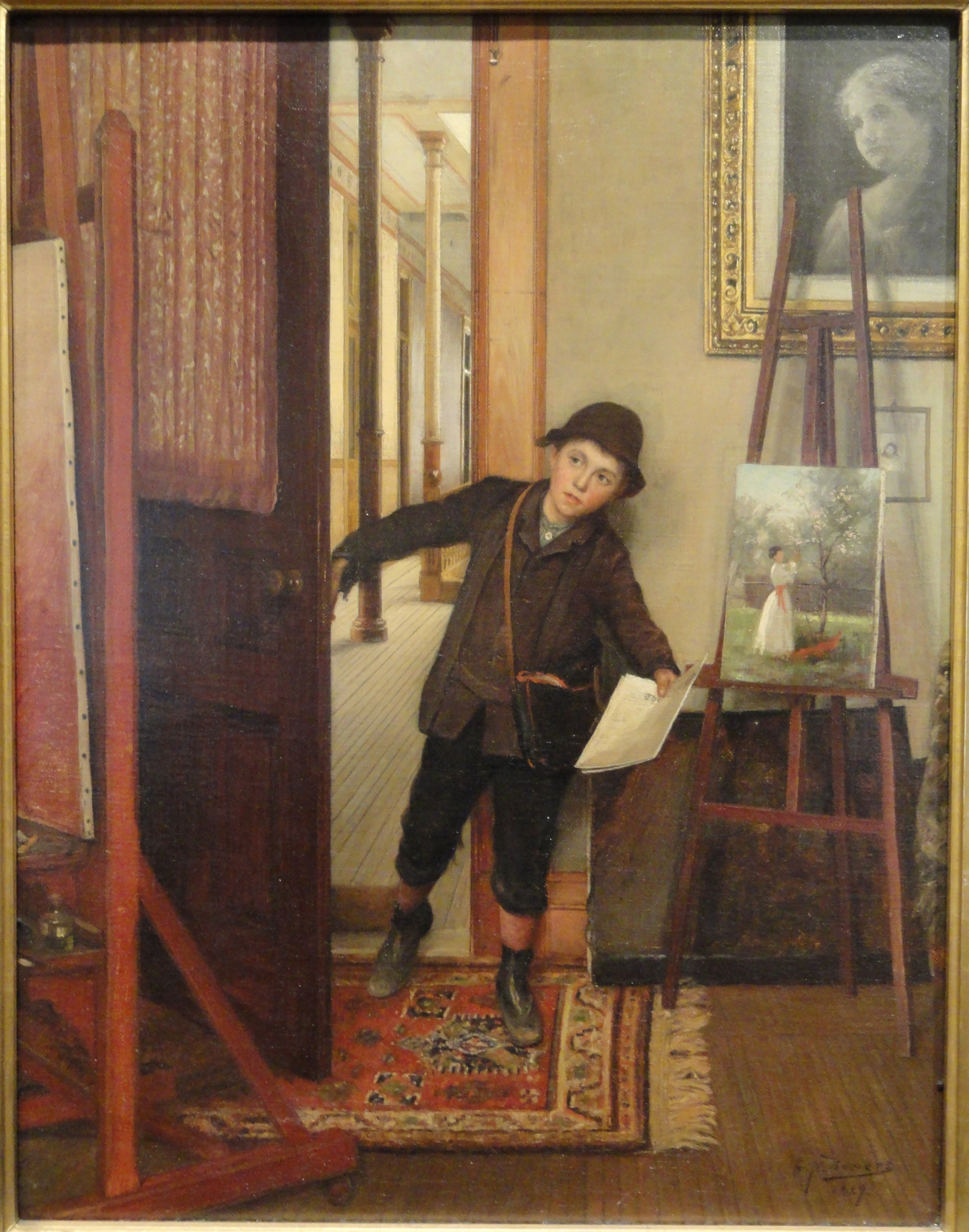
The Newsboy by George Newell Bowers, 1889

George Newell Bowers (1849 – 1909, active 1872–1906) was an American painter in Springfield, Massachusetts.

Few details are known of Bowers' life. He worked as a druggist's clerk in Springfield, Massachusetts before leaving to study art at the Art Students League of New York in New York City, and then from 1874 to 1879 in the studio of Léon Bonnat in Paris. He then returned as a painter to Springfield. After further study with the Art Student League, circa 1892 he became an impressionist landscape painter.
