= Bauer (surname) =

Bauer is a Germanic occupational surname or German and Swiss origin meaning "peasant" or "farmer".

== Notable people ==
=== A ===
- Adolf Bauer (1940–2026), German politician
- Alain Bauer (born 1962), French criminologist
- Alexander Bauer (born 1972), German politician
- Alfred Bauer (1911–1986), German lawyer and film historian
- Alice Bauer (1927–2002), American golfer
- Alix Bauer (born 1971), Mexican singer
- Amanda Bauer (born 1979), American astronomer and science communicator
- André Bauer (born 1969), American politician
- Andreas Bauer, multiple people
- Ann Bauer (born 1966), American essayist and novelist
- Antun Bauer (disambiguation), several people
- Arndt Bauer (born 1986), German bobsledder
- Axel Bauer (born 1961), French singer, composer, guitarist and actor

=== B ===
- Benjamin Bauer (politician) (born 1988), German politician
- Belinda Bauer (disambiguation), several people
- Branko Bauer (1921–2002), Croatian film director
- Bruno Bauer (1809–1882), German philosopher, theologian and historian

=== C ===
- Carl W. Bauer (1933–2013), American politician
- Caroline Bauer (1807–1877), German actress
- Catalina Bauer (born 1976), Chilean artist
- Charita Bauer (1922–1985), American soap opera actress
- Chris Bauer (born 1966), American actor
- Christian Bauer (born 1977), French chess player
- Christina Bauer (born 1988), French volleyball player
- Conny Bauer (born 1943), free jazz trombonist
- Craig Bauer, American mixing engineer and record producer

=== D ===
- Daniel Bauer, multiple people
- David Bauer (disambiguation), several people
- Denise Bauer (born 1964), American diplomat
- Donna Bauer (born 1970), Australian politician
- Dorothee Bauer (born 1983), German sport shooter

=== E ===
- Eddie Bauer (1899–1986), American clothing manufacturer
- Edgar Bauer (1820–1886), German writer, journalist and political philosopher
- Edmond Bauer (1880–1963), French physicist
- Edwin L. Bauer (1905–c. 1989), American architect in Hawai'i
- Eleanor Bauer, American choreographer and dancer
- Emily Bauer (born 1981), American singer, dancer, actress/voice actress
- Erich Bauer (1900–1980), Nazi SS Guard at Sobibor death camp during World War II
- Ernst Bauer (disambiguation), several people
- Erwin Bauer (1912–1958), German Formula One driver

=== F ===
- Felice Bauer (1887–1960), fiancée of Franz Kafka
- Ferdinand Bauer (1760–1826), Austrian botanical illustrator; brother of Franz
- Frank Bauer, multiple people
- Frans Bauer (born 1973), Dutch singer
- Franz Bauer (1758–1840), Austrian botanical illustrator; brother of Ferdinand
- Friedrich Bauer, multiple people
- Fritz Bauer (1903–1968), German judge and prosecutor, notable for bringing Nazis to justice

=== G ===
- Gary Bauer (born 1946), American politician
- George J. Bauer (1871–1942), American politician
- Georg Bauer, better known as Georgius Agricola (1490–1555), German scholar
- Gustav Bauer (disambiguation), multiple people
- Gustave Bauer (1884–1947), American wrestler

=== H ===
- Hans Bauer, multiple people
- Harald Bauer (born 1949), German politician
- Heinrich Bauer, multiple people
- Heinz Bauer (1928–2002), German mathematician
- Helen Bauer (born 1991), English actor, comedian and writer
- Herbert Bauer, multiple people
- Hinko Bauer (1908–1986), Croatian-Jewish architect

=== I ===
- Ida Bauer (1882–1945), a hysterical patient of Sigmund Freud known as Dora
- Ina Bauer (disambiguation), several people

=== J ===
- Jack Bauer (disambiguation), several people
- Jacob Bauer (born 2002), Australian rules footballer
- Jase Bauer (born 2002), American football player
- Jasna Fritzi Bauer (born 1989), Swiss actress
- Jill Bauer, Hearst and SPJ journalist, documentarian and non-fiction author
- John Bauer (disambiguation), several people
- Jon Bauer (born 1977), Canadian songwriter
- José Carlos Bauer (1925–2007), Brazilian footballer
- Josef Bauer, multiple people
- Joseph Bauer (1845–1938), German-American labor organizer and politician
- Joy Bauer (born 1963), American nutritionist
- Julia Bauer, German coloratura soprano
- Jutta Bauer (1955–2025), German illustrator

=== K ===
- Katharina Bauer (born 1990), German pole vaulter
- Klemen Bauer (born 1986), Slovenian biathlete
- Konrad Bauer (1919–1990), German fighter ace and Knight's Cross recipient
- Kristin Bauer van Straten (born 1973), American actress

=== L ===
- Laurie Bauer (born 1949), British linguist
- Lisa Bauer (born 1960), Canadian field hockey player
- Lorna Bauer, (born 1980), Canadian artist
- Ludwig Bauer (1876–1935), Austro-Swiss journalist, pacifist and writer
- Lukáš Bauer (born 1977), Czech cross country skier
- Lyle Bauer (1958–2024), Canadian football player and executive

=== M ===
- Marc Bauer (born 1975), Swiss artist
- Marcel Bauer (born 1992), German politician
- Marianne Bauer, West German luger
- Mariano Peralta Bauer (born 1998), Argentine footballer
- Marion Bauer (1882–1955), American composer
- Martin Bauer, social psychologist
- Maureen Bauer, American politician
- Max Hermann Bauer (1869–1929) German staff officer in World War I
- Maximilian Bauer, multiple people
- Michael Bauer, multiple people
- Michelle Bauer (born 1958), bondage model and actress
- Moritz Bauer (born 1992), Austrian footballer

=== N ===
- Nicole Bauer (born 1987), German politician

=== O ===
- Ola Bauer (1943–1999), Norwegian novelist and playwright
- Otto Bauer (1881–1938), Austrian theoretician and politician

=== P ===
- Patrick Bauer, multiple people
- Paul Bauer (1896–1990) German poet and mountaineer
- Peggy Bauer (1932–2004), American wildlife photographer
- Peter Bauer, multiple people

=== R ===
- Ralph Bauer, multiple people
- Riccardo Bauer (1896–1982), Italian journalist and politician
- Robert Bauer (disambiguation), several people
- Rudolf Bauer (disambiguation), several people

=== S ===
- Siegfried Bauer (1961–2018), German physicist
- Stanley J. Bauer (1913–1972), American politician from New York
- Stefan Bauer, English lecturer
- Steve Bauer (born 1959), Canadian cyclist
- Steven Bauer (born 1956), American actor
- Susan Wise Bauer, American author, English instructor and founder of Well-Trained Mind Press
- Sven H. Bauer, Swedish scout
- Sybil Bauer (1903–1927), American competition swimmer, Olympic champion, and former world record-holder

=== T ===
- Talya Bauer, Endowed Cameron Professor of Management
- Theresia Bauer (born 1965), German politician
- Thomas Bauer, multiple people
- Tom Bauer (born 1946), American lawyer and politician
- Trevor Bauer (born 1991), baseball pitcher
- Tristán Bauer (born 1959), Argentine filmmaker
- Truus Bauer (1946–2013), Dutch rower

=== V ===
- Viktor Bauer (1915–1969), German World War II flying ace
- Viola Bauer (born 1976), German skier

=== W ===
- Walter Bauer (1877–1960), theologian and ancient Greek philologist
- Wilhelm Bauer (1822–1875), German U-boat engineer
- William Bauer (disambiguation), several people
- Willy Bauer (born 1947), German motocross driver
- Wolf Bauer (born 1939), German politician
- Wolfgang Bauer (disambiguation), several people

=== Y ===
- Yehuda Bauer (1926–2024), Czech-Israeli Holocaust historian
- Yevgeni Bauer (1865–1917), Russian silent film director
- Yvonne Bauer, German publisher

== Mononym ==
- Bauer (illustrator) (born 1969), French illustrator and editorial cartoonist

== Fictional characters ==
- From the American television series 24
  - Graem Bauer
  - Jack Bauer
  - Josh Bauer (24)
  - Kim Bauer
  - Marilyn Bauer
  - Phillip Bauer
  - Teri Bauer
- From the American television series Guiding Light
  - Beth Bauer
  - Ed Bauer
  - Michelle Bauer Santos
- Other
  - Denise Bauer from the American television series Boston Legal
  - June Bauer from the American television series Community
  - Stephanie Bauer from Istanbul

== See also ==
- Bauers, a similar surname
- Bower (surname)
- Bowers (surname)
