= Hom Nguyen =

French painter (b. 1972)

- Born: September 20, 1972 (age 53); Paris, France
- Notable work: Napoléon, Michèle Obama, Edith Piaf, L'abbé Pierre, Aimé Césaire
- Mother: Thi Lan Nguyen
- Awards: Knight of the National Order of Merit
- Website: www.hom-nguyen.com

Hom Nguyen (born 20 September 1972) is a French painter of Vietnamese origin. His works are mostly portraits in a figurative style. He lives and works in Paris.

== Early life ==
Thi Lan Nguyen, Hom Nguyen's mother left Vietnam at the end of the 1970s for France and settled in Paris. In 1972 she gave birth to her only child, Hom Nguyen. Following a 1978 car accident, his mother was paraplegic. In an interview with artist and musician Manu Katché, Nguyen says : "My only family was my mother. She couldn't work with her disability, that's why I left school at a young age and started working". In 2009 his mother died. Hom Nguyen, a shoe salesman at this time, decided to devote himself to drawing and painting.

== Career ==
Hom Nguyen is a self-taught artist and never took drawing lessons. His painting is figurative. He began by painting huge portraits of celebrities. From then on he would create more personal works of women and children, echoes of his past. He realizes his works on canvas in different mediums, pencil, pastels, china ink, charcoal, acrylic, and oil. On the occasion of the 2016 edition of the contemporary Paris Art Fair, organised at the Grand Palais in Paris, the President of the Republic François Hollande was shown his work. His work on the representation of the human figure was presented in multiple solo and group exhibitions around the world through international contemporary art fairs. In the Bangkok Post, Hom Nguyen says that he is the bearer of a dual western and eastern culture, and he is working to open a wider cultural platform, a link between France and Asia. In 2019, in collaboration with the museum La Monnaie de Paris and Vogue magazine, he painted a portrait of Michelle Obama. The artwork was auctioned by Christie's and funds raised were pledged to be donated to support gender equality and women's empowerment, led by United Nations Women. That same year he donated a portrait of Édith Piaf which to be exhibited at the entrance to the Meyniel wing of the Tenon Hospital where Piaf was born in 1915. The artist then participated in the commemoration of the 250th anniversary of Napoleon Bonaparte, by making a contemporary portrait of the emperor for the Tour du Sel in Calvi. Hom Nguyen was made Knight of the National Order of Merit of France on 24 November 2021.

In December 2021, the Musée de l'Homme took up the issue of the under-representation of people of diversity in public space. Hom Nguyen created, for the exhibition Portraits de France, a work representing Aimé Césaire.

In May 2022, the artist donated a work to the Hôtel National des Invalides to support wounded soldiers and bereaved families from all armies.

In 2024, the French Post Office is celebrating Charles Aznavour 100th birth anniversary. A collector's stamp bearing the singer's image is produced by Hom Nguyen.

== Artwork ==
Hom Nguyen uses many relatively different materials such as oil, acrylic, ink, gouache felt, Indian ink or charcoal. The artist's work is part of an introspective approach, echoes of a resilient memory, in which questions of integration and immigration resonate, sometimes very contemporary, at others more contemplative.

== Exhibitions ==
- 2025 : One is art Gallery, solo show, Tokyo, Japon.
- 2024 : Musée du Touquet-Paris-Plage, solo show, Le Touquet-Paris-Plage, France.
- 2024 : Solid Art, Paris, France.
- 2023 : Step Creation Gallery, Solo show, Hong Kong, China.
- 2023 : Musée d’art et d’histoire Paul-Éluard, solo show, Saint Denis, France.
- 2023 : Musée de la Légion Étrangère, Monsieur Légionnaire portrait, France.
- 2023 : Atelier Grognard, art center, solo show, Rueil Malmaison, France.
- 2022 : Hôtel National des Invalides, collective exhibition, France.
- 2021 : Aimé Césaire, work produced for the exhibition Portraits de France, Musée de l'Homme, France.
- 2021: Musée de La Monnaie de Paris, collective exhibition, Togeth'her, Madame Figaro iconic's women, France.
- 2021: Art Central Hong Kong, art fair, Hong Kong.
- 2021: Place des arts, outside solo show, Les Valeurs Humaines, Cergy Pontoise, France.
- 2021: Abbé Pierre Fondation, donation, France.
- 2020: Not a Gallery, solo show, Empreintes, France.
- 2019: Miaja Gallery, solo show, Racines, Singapore.
- 2019: Camp Raffalli, Solo show, Corse, France.
- 2019: L'embarcadère, cultural space, solo show, Racines, Montceau-les-mines, France.
- 2019: Tour du Sel Calvi, Solo show, Racines, Corse, France.:
- 2019: Chateau de Madame Graffigny, solo show, Racines, Villers-lès-nancy, France.
- 2019: Tenon hospital, donation, Edith Piaf, France.
- 2019: Musée de la Monnaie de Paris, Collective exhibition, Togeth'her, Magazine Vogue, France.
- 2019: S.A.C Gallery, collective exhibition, So What, Bangkok, Thailand.
- 2018: A2Z Gallery, solo show, You Man, Hong Kong.
- 2018: Art Paris art fair, Grand Palais, represented by A2Z Gallery, France.
- 2018: Station, solo show, Voyage, Paris, France.
- 2018: A2Z Gallery, solo show, Dark Side, Paris, France.
- 2018: Sofitel, solo show, Life's Doodle, Bangkok, Thailand.
- 2017: Montresso Art fondation, solo show, Lignes de vies, Marrakech, Morocco.
- 2017: A2Z Gallery, solo show, Trajectoire, Paris, France.
- 2017: Le Carmel, solo show, Tarbes, France.
- 2017: Art Central Hong Kong, art fair, represented by A2Z gallery, Hong Kong.
- 2016: Asia Now, art fair, represented by A2Z gallery, Paris, France.
- 2016 : A2Z Gallery, solo show, Inner cry, Paris, France.
- 2016: Metis Gallery, solo show, Sans repaires, Bali.
- 2016: Art Paris art fair, Grand Palais, represented by A2Z Gallery, France.
- 2016: Art Central Hong Kong, art fair, represented by A2Z gallery, Hong Kong.
- 2015: Art Paris art fair, Grand Palais, represented by A2Z Gallery, France.
- 2015: A2Z Gallery, solo show, Le combat du siècle, Paris, France.
