= Bauer (illustrator) =

French editorial cartoonist and illustrator

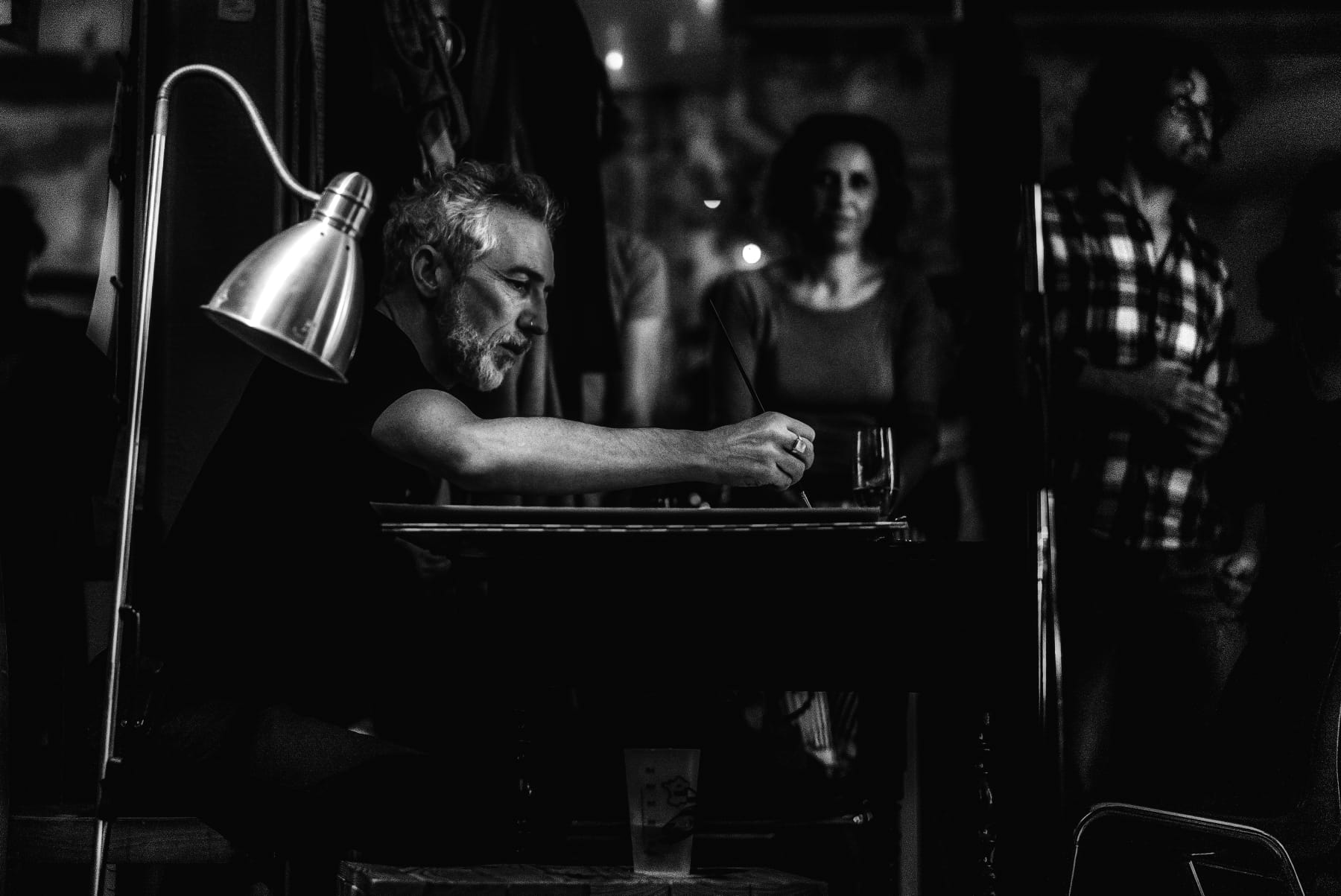
- Bauer drawing live (photo: Camille Dudoubs)
- Born: 20 January 1969 (age 57); Besançon, France
- Known for: Editorial cartooning, illustration, reportage sketchbooks
- Notable work: Bauer jette l'encre (2008), Ultimes esquisses (2018)

Bauer (born 20 January 1969) is a French editorial cartoonist, illustrator and journalist. He is known for his work published in Le Progrès, Marianne, Rue89, Psikopat and for his long-term artistic collaboration with the contemporary circus company Cirque Plume, for which he produced immersive sketchbooks over more than twenty years.

== Biography ==
Bauer studied drawing for four years at the École des Arts Graphiques de Lyon (La Martinière Terreaux), where he graduated as a graphic artist.

He later lived in Paris for thirteen years, working in graphic design, art direction, video-game department management at Fnac Montparnasse, and tattooing in Pigalle and Bastille. During this period, he began publishing in the national press. His move toward editorial cartooning was influenced by encounters with French cartoonists Tignous and Roger Blachon at the Festival du Vent in Calvi.

== Career ==
Bauer began drawing for the press in 1999. His early work appeared in L'Humanité Hebdo, Marianne and Amnesty International. He has been the official editorial cartoonist for Le Progrès (Lyon) since 2004.

He has contributed to numerous national and regional publications, including Marianne, Rue89, Psikopat, L'Actu, Zurban, Bakchich, Siné Hebdo, Parapente Mag, La Riposte, Une minute de Silence, La Mèche (Montpellier), Satiricon (Toulouse), L'Humanité and Science & Vie Junior.

He has also participated in public debates, conferences and discussions related to press freedom, particularly since the Charlie Hebdo attacks.

== Collaboration with Cirque Plume ==
Bauer developed a long-term artistic collaboration with Cirque Plume, documenting rehearsals, backstage activities and tours through sketchbooks created on site. His drawings provide a visual record of the company’s history.

His work has been exhibited in Besançon and during Cirque Plume’s final tour.

His book Ultimes esquisses documents the final creation of Cirque Plume.

== Publications ==
- Bauer jette l’encre (Favre, 2008)
- Bauer parmi les Plume (2010)
- Au fil de la Plume (2013)
- Les aventures de Monsieur Riskalo (Gereso, 2010)
- Ultimes esquisses (2018)
- Chromosome X (2024)
- Carnet de creation (Éditions Soacd, 2025)

He has also contributed to collective works and illustrated during Cirque Plume performances.

== Exhibitions ==
Notable exhibitions include:

- Très en Traits, La Chaux-d’Abel (Switzerland), July–August 2025
- Théâtre Berthelot (Montreuil), 2015
- Travel sketchbook exhibition in Dole
- Cirque Plume exhibition at Chez Marcel (Besançon)
- Exhibitions during Cirque Plume’s final tour
- Exhibitions in La Chaux-de-Fonds (Switzerland), during the Plage des Six Pompes festival
- Exhibition of four drawings at the Victor Hugo Museum (Besançon), from 13 September 2013

He has conducted art workshops at the prison in Besançon.

== Style and themes ==
Bauer’s work is characterised by an incisive line and a graphic approach grounded in social and political observation. His editorial cartoons frequently address political, social and cultural issues, often through irony or dark humour, depending on the subject matter.

His sketchbooks and reportage drawings follow an immersive approach: produced “on the spot”, they document scenes from performances, travels or everyday situations, notably during the productions of the Cirque Plume. This practice emphasises spontaneity and the capture of movement, gesture and atmosphere.

Journalist Frank Tenaille has also described Bauer as an artist concerned with “capturing the human” and using humour as a way to take distance from reality.

== Awards ==
- Public Prize, Rouen (2000)
- Humour Jeune Prize, Saint-Just-le-Martel (2004)
- Crayon de porcelaine – Regional Press (2005)
- Goudron et Plumes Prize (2006)
- Jury Special Prize (2009)
