= Bauer Brothers =

Bauer Brothers refers to the Austrian botanical illustrators who were brothers:

- Franz Bauer (1758–1840)
- Ferdinand Bauer (1760–1826)
- Josef Anton Bauer (1756–1830)

== See also ==
- Bauer (surname)
