= John Bower (disambiguation) =

John Bower (1940–2017) was an American skier.

John Bower may also refer to:

- John Dykes Bower (1905–1981), English cathedral organist
- John Oates Bower (1901–1981), Canadian politician, businessman and executive
- John W. Bower (1800–1850), Texas settler and signatory to the Texas Declaration of Independence
- John Bower (MP for Penryn), English politician

== See also ==
- John Bauer (disambiguation)
- John Bowyer (disambiguation)
- John Bowers (disambiguation)
