= Michael Bauer =

Michael Bauer may refer to:

- Michael Bauer (artist) (born 1973), German artist
- Michael Gerard Bauer (born 1955), Australian author
- Michael Bauer (basketball) (born 1980), American basketball player
- Mike Bauer (born 1959), American tennis player
- Michael Bauer (officer) (1895–1943), German officer
- Michael Bauer, a character in Fashion House
- Michael W. Bauer (born 1969), German political scientist
