= John Bowyer =

John Bowyer may refer to:

== Politicians ==
- John Bowyer (MP for Penryn) or Bower, MP for Penrhyn, 1563
- John Bowyer (MP for Derby), in 1383, MP for Derby
- John Bowyer (fl. 1404), MP for Wells
- John Bowyer (died 1605), MP for Newcastle-under-Lyme (UK Parliament constituency)
- Sir John Bowyer, 1st Baronet (1623–1666), English soldier and MP for Staffordshire 1646, and Newcastle-under-Lyme
- Sir John Bowyer, 2nd Baronet (1653–1691), English MP for Warwick and Staffordshire 1679–1685

== Others ==
- John Bowyer (cricketer) (1790–1880), English professional cricketer
- John M. Bowyer (1853–1912), officer in the United States Navy

== See also ==
- John Bower (disambiguation)
