= Hans Bauer =

Hans Bauer may refer to:

- Hans Bauer (footballer) (1927–1997), German footballer
- Hans F. Bauer (1932–2009), American research chemist
- Hans Bauer (semitist) (1878–1937), German semitist
- Hans Bauer (cross-country skier) (1903–1992), German Olympic skier
- Hans Bauer (writer), Austrian (working in USA) screenwriter, author and photographer

== See also ==
- Hans Baur (1897–1993), Adolf Hitler's personal pilot
