= John Bowers =

John Bowers or Johnathan Bowers may refer to:

- John Bowers (actor) (1885–1936), American stage and silent film actor
- John Bowers (bishop) (1854–1926), Anglican bishop of Thetford
- John Bowers (cricketer) (born 1996), English cricketer
- John Bowers (diplomat) (1912–2004), Sudan Political Service mystic who worked for UNESCO
- John Bowers (lawyer) (born 1956), Principal of Brasenose College, Oxford
- John Bowers (loudspeaker builder) (1923–1987), British HiFi pioneer
- John Bowers (unionist) (1922–2011), American labor union leader
- John Bowers (writer) (1928–2025), American writer and academic
- John M. Bowers (1772–1846), U.S. Representative from New York
- John C. Bowers (1811–1873), African American entrepreneur, organist, vestryman and civil rights advocate in Philadelphia
- John E. Bowers, American physicist, engineer, researcher and educator

== See also ==
- Jack Bowers (1908–1970), Derby County, Leicester City and England footballer
- John Bower (disambiguation)
