= Hinko Bauer =

Croatian-Jewish architect

- Born: January 17, 1908; Trieste, Austro-Hungarian Empire, (now Italy)
- Died: January 12, 1986 (aged 77); Zagreb, SR Croatia, SFR Yugoslavia, (now Croatia)
- Education: University of Rijeka
- Occupation: Architect

Hinko Bauer (pronounced [xîːŋko bǎuer]; (January 17, 1908 – January 12, 1986) was a Croatian-Jewish architect.

Bauer was born in Trieste, then part of the Austro-Hungarian Empire. As a young boy he moved to Rijeka, where he attended and finished architecture at the University of Rijeka. During study, he worked for art nouveau Croatian architect Rudolf Lubinski. After education in 1931, Bauer was employed at the architect studio of another Croatian Jewish architect, Zlatko Neumann. From 1936 until the beginning of World War II, he worked for Croatian architect Marijan Haberle.

In 1943, Bauer joined the Partisans. One year later, he was arrested and deported to the Dachau concentration camp. There, he managed to survive the Holocaust.

Bauer returned to Zagreb in 1954 to found his own architect studio "Bauer". Bauer is best known for his architectural work such as: "Zagrebački zbor" (now Student Center of University of Zagreb) at Savska street, for which Bauer and Haberle won the first prize, "Narodno sveučilište" (Public University) at Kordunska Street, Zagreb and Clinical Hospital "Jordanovac" at Jordanovac Street, Zagreb.

Bauer died in Zagreb on 12 January 1986, aged 77. He was buried at Mirogoj Cemetery.
