= Vatroslav Lisinski Concert Hall =

Concert hall and convention center in Zagreb, Croatia

- Koncertna dvorana Vatroslav Lisinski
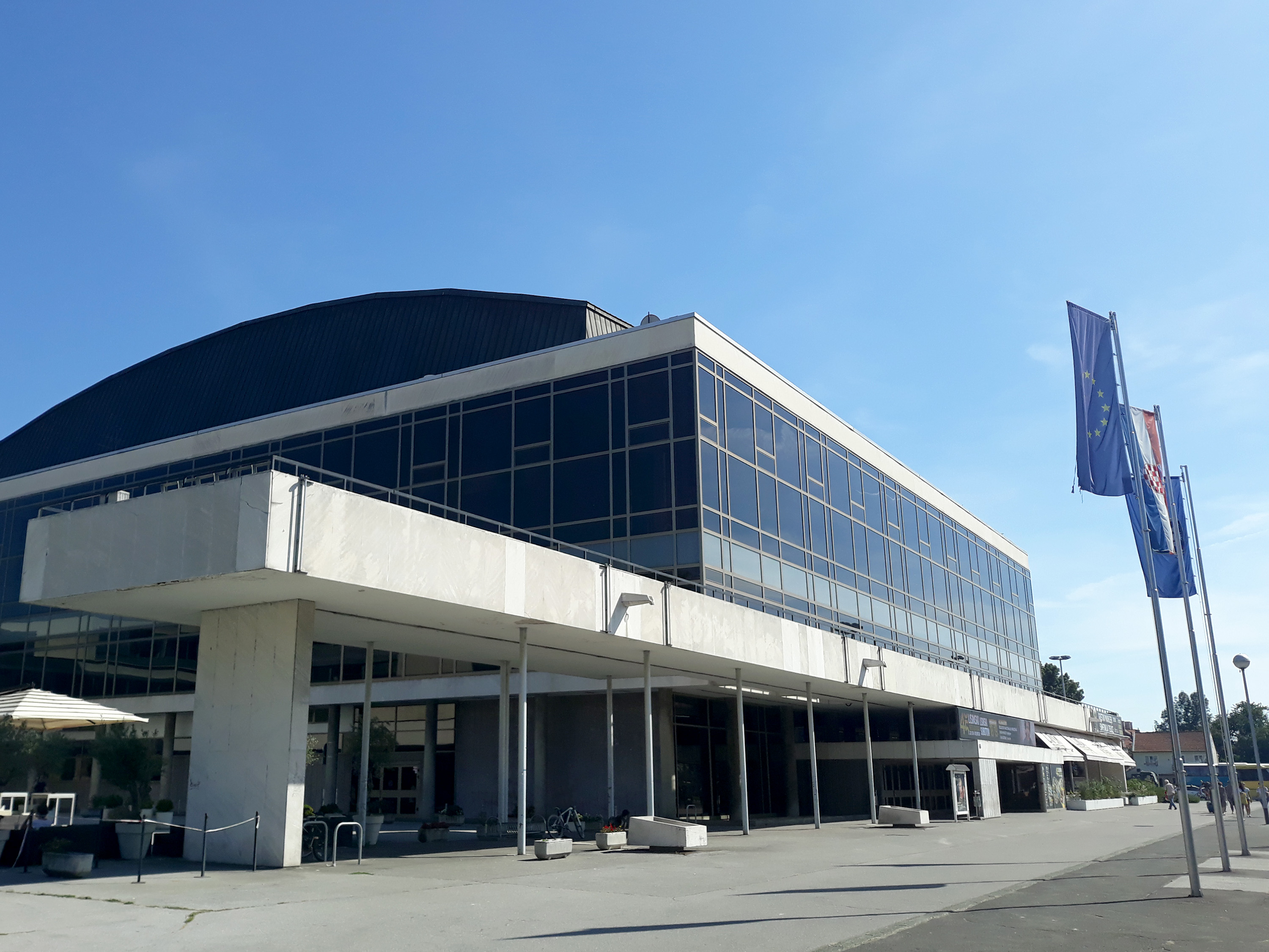
- Vatroslav Lisinski Hall facade
- Interactive map of Vatroslav Lisinski Concert Hall
- Address: 4 Stjepan Radić Square; Zagreb, Croatia
- Operator: Zagreb Philharmonic Orchestra; Croatian Radio and Television Symphony Orchestra
- Capacity: 305–1,841
- Type: Concert hall

Construction
- Opened: December 29, 1973; 52 years ago
- Rebuilt: 1990, 1999, 2009
- Architect: Marijan Haberle

Website
- www.lisinski.hr

Cultural Good of Croatia
- Type: Protected cultural good
- Reference no.: Z-677

Vatroslav Lisinski Concert Hall (Croatian: Koncertna dvorana Vatroslava Lisinskog) is a large concert hall and convention center in Zagreb, Croatia. It is named after Vatroslav Lisinski, a 19th-century Croatian composer. The building has a big hall with 1,841 seats and a small hall with 305 seats. A large lobby doubles as an exhibition area.

== History ==
The decision to build a new multifunctional hall in Zagreb was made in 1957. A team of architects led by Marijan Haberle won the design contest. The construction began in 1961, but flooding and financial difficulties pushed the completion date into the next decade. The hall was finally opened on 29 December 1973.

The Vatroslav Lisinski Concert Hall is named after the composer of the first Croatian opera Ljubav i zloba (Love and Malice) - Vatroslav Lisinski. The opening ceremony took place over two days, on December 29 and 30, 1973. On 29 December, the celebration began with a concert by the Zagreb Philharmonic Orchestra, the Mixed Choir of the Opera of the Croatian National Theatre in Zagreb and the Mixed Choir of the Vatroslav Lisinski Music School in Zagreb, who performed excerpts from the opera Porin and the song Prosto zrakom ptica lati (Simply by Air, the Bird Is Flying) and Now You Should Sing from the first Croatian opera Love and Malice by Vatroslav Lisinski. The central concert was marked by Bersa's Sunny Fields, P. I. Tchaikovsky's Piano Concerto in B minor, Orpheus' aria from Gluck's opera Orpheus and Eurydice, and Dvořák's Ninth Symphony, From the New World with the Zagreb Philharmonic Orchestra and mezzo-soprano Ruža Pospiš-Baldani, conducted by maestro Milan Horvat. Since then, for 50 years, December 29 has been celebrated as the Day of the Lisinski Hall. The concert hall has organized a number of concerts by musicians of all genres; it serves as the stage for classical music, opera, ballet and theater performances, as well as many international congresses and conventions. The hall saw 10 million visitors in the first thirty years of operation. In 2007, a total of 450 different shows were put together, recording over 760,000 visitors.

Vatroslav Lisinski Concert Hall was the venue of the 1990 Eurovision Song Contest, after its first major renovation in 1989. In 1992, the hall's copper roof cover was completely replaced. Further reconstruction and redecoration work was done in 1999 and 2009.

== Notable guests and musicians ==
=== Philharmonic ===
Some of the most notable musicians that have been performing in the Hall are the Berlin Philharmonic, the Vienna Philharmonic, the London Royal Philharmonic Orchestra, the La Scala Philharmonic Orchestra, the Munich Radio Orchestra, the Shanghai Philharmonic Orchestra, the Budapest Festival Orchestra, the BBC Philharmonic, the Israel Philharmonic. The ensembles conducted at the Lisinski have been led by Leonard Bernstein, Lovro von Matačić, Zubin Mehta, Lorin Maazel, Valery Gergiev, András Schiff, Gidon Kremer, Riccardo Muti, Karl Richter, Mariss Jansons, Philippe Herreweghe, Sergiu Celibidache, Dmitri Kitayenko, Vasily Petrenko, Vjekoslav Šutej, Nikša Bareza, Valery Polyansky, Hugh Wolff, Plácido Domingo, Ivan Repušić and many others.

=== Opera ===
Opera soloists such as Teresa Berganza, Montserrat Caballé, Elīna Garanča, Inva Mula, Krassimira Stoyanova, Sumi Jo, Ruža Pospiš-Baldani, Dunja Vejzović, Luciano Pavarotti, José Carreras, Dmitri Hvorostovsky, Leo Nucci, Vittorio Grigolo, Vladimir Ruždjak

=== Virtuosos ===
Instrumental virtuosos Ivo Pogorelić, Marta Argerich, Maria João Pires, Claudio Arrau, Vladimir Ashkenazi, Svjatoslav Richter, Lang Lang, Daniil Trifonov, Evgeny Kissin, Michel Legrand, Vadim Repin, Maxim Vengerov, Joshua Bell, Sergej Krylov, Olivier Latry, Cameron Carpenter, Mischa Maisky, Mstislav Rostropovich, Emmanuel Pahud, Richard Galliano, Radovan Vlatković, Petrit Çeku...

=== Mainstream artists ===
Along with world-renowned names in pop, jazz, and classical music, the Hall has also hosted major figures, including Tina Turner, Ray Charles, Sting, Nick Cave, Chris Cornell, Arturo Sandoval, Cesária Évora, Omara Portuondo, The Platters, Dizzy Gillespie, Ella Fitzgerald, Sarah Vaughan, Dianne Reeves, Juliette Gréco, Natalie Cole, Chick Corea, Charles Aznavour, Misia, Paco de Lucía, Diana Krall, Pat Metheny, Gheorghe Zamfir, Vice Vukov, Tereza Kesovija, Josipa Lisac, Oliver Dragojević, and Arsen Dedić.

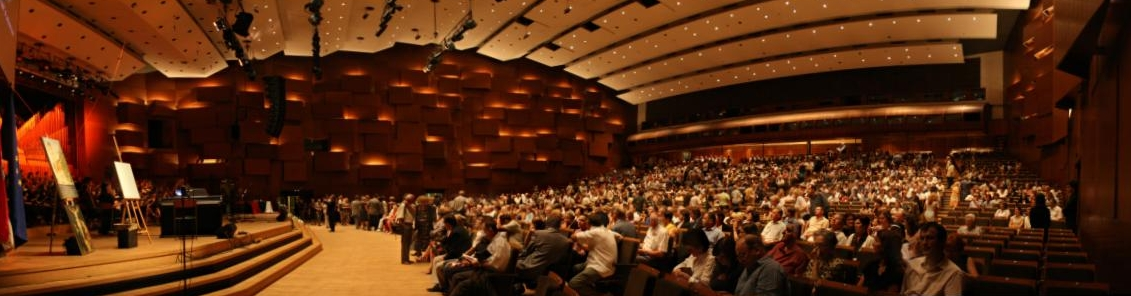
The Big Hall during a charity concert in 2008

== Events ==
On May 5, 1990, the hall hosted the Eurovision Song Contest.

The "Papandopulo" Croatian Competition of young musicians is hosted in the small hall annually in January. The competition was founded in 2012 and 2026 saw the 14th edition of the competition, which is named for the celebrated Croatian composer and musician Boris Papandopulo.

== Gallery ==
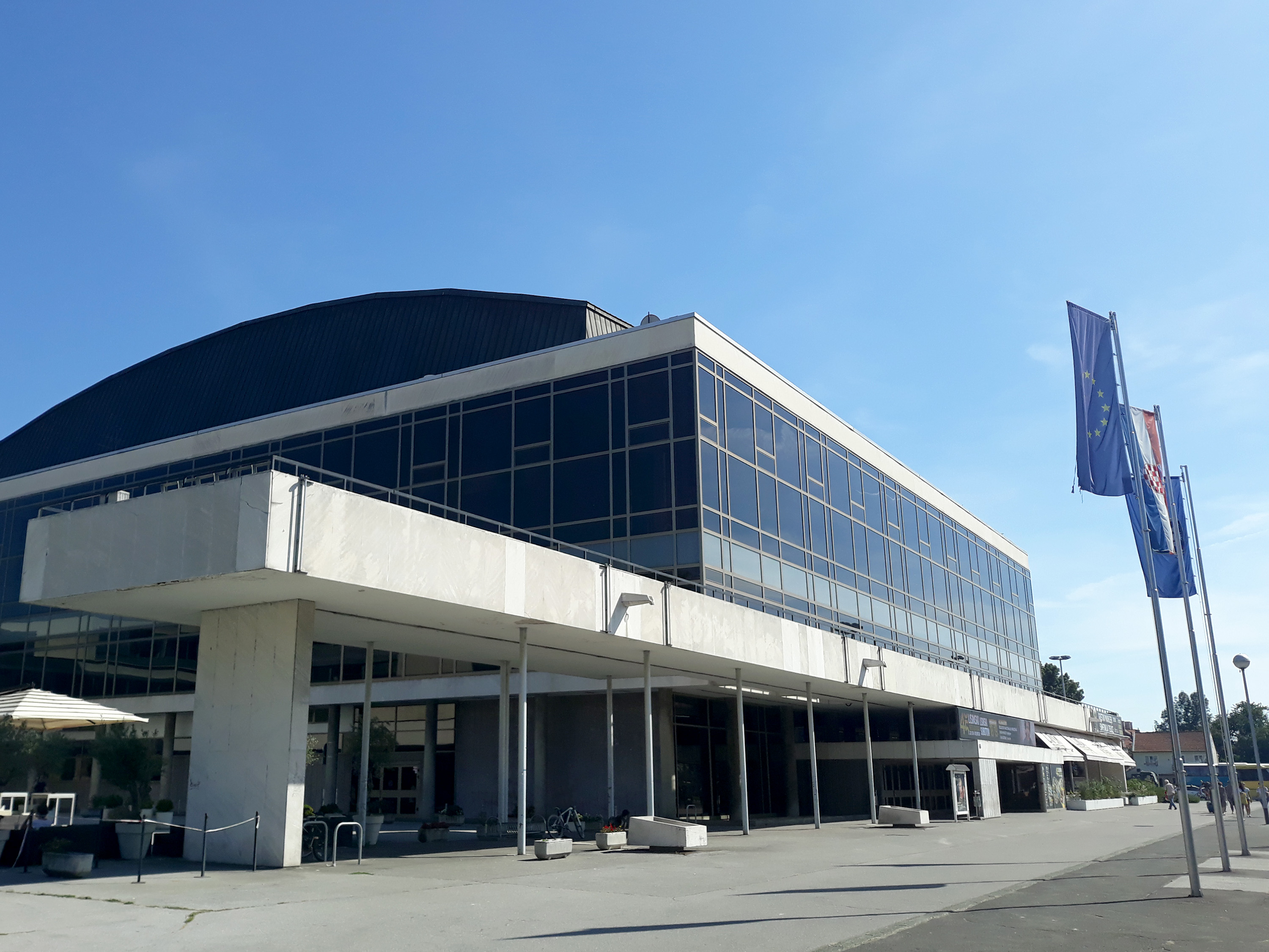
Building from up close.

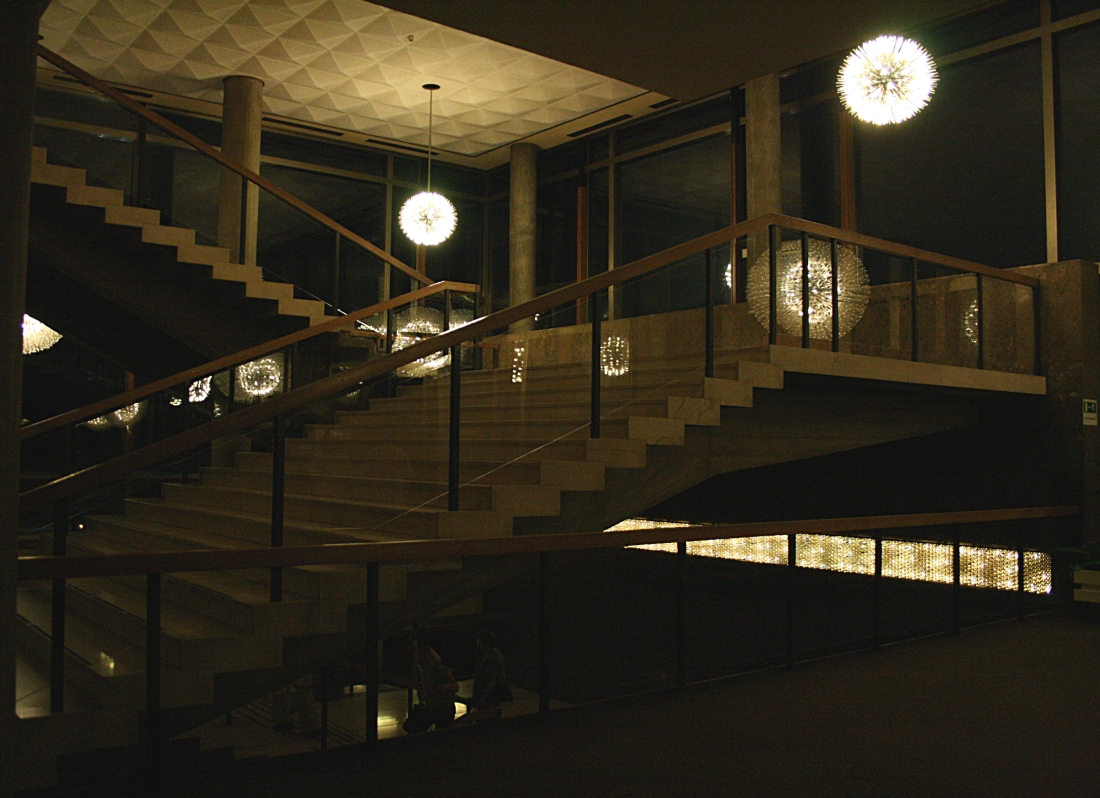
Lobby.

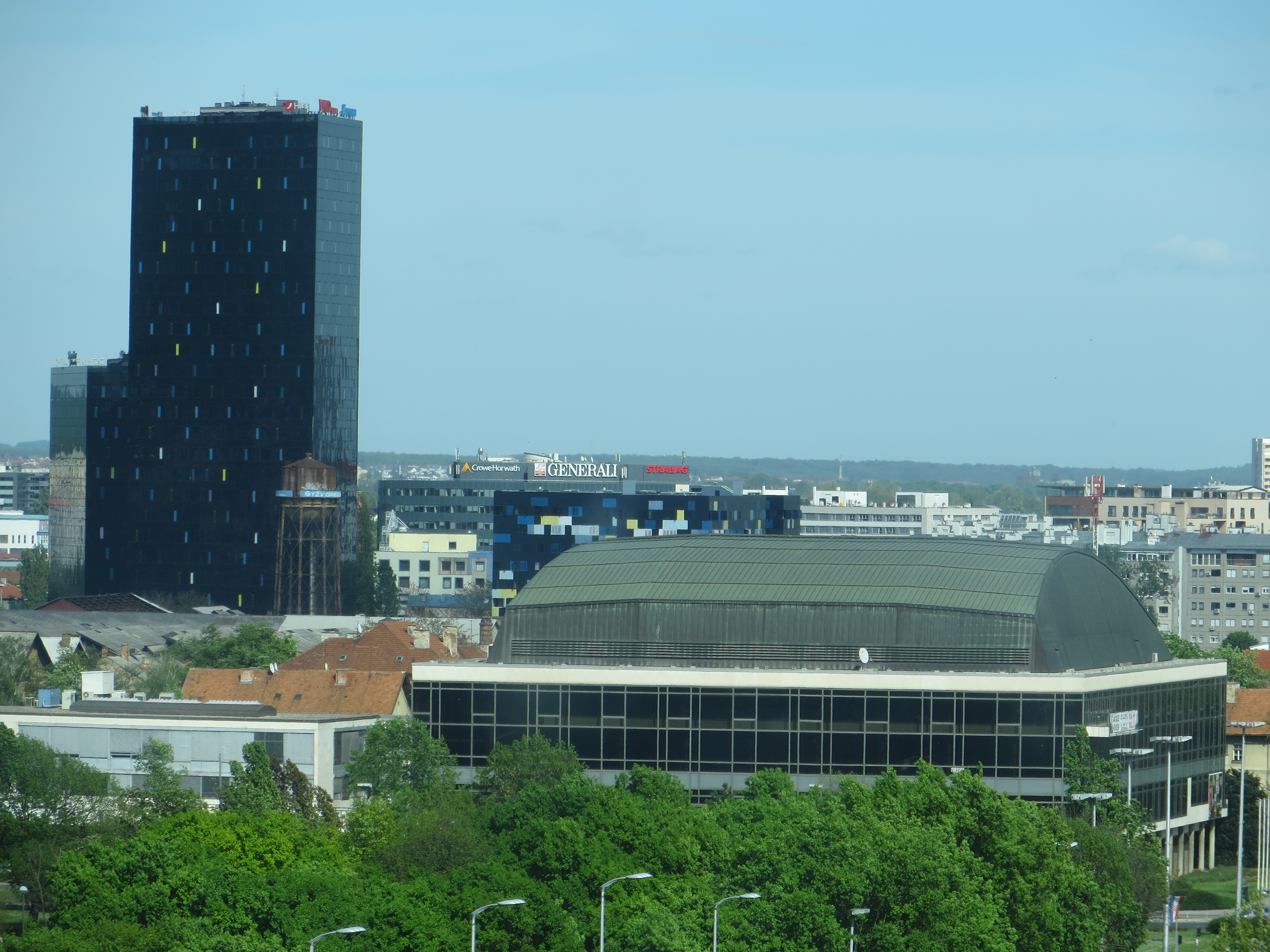
View from the west.

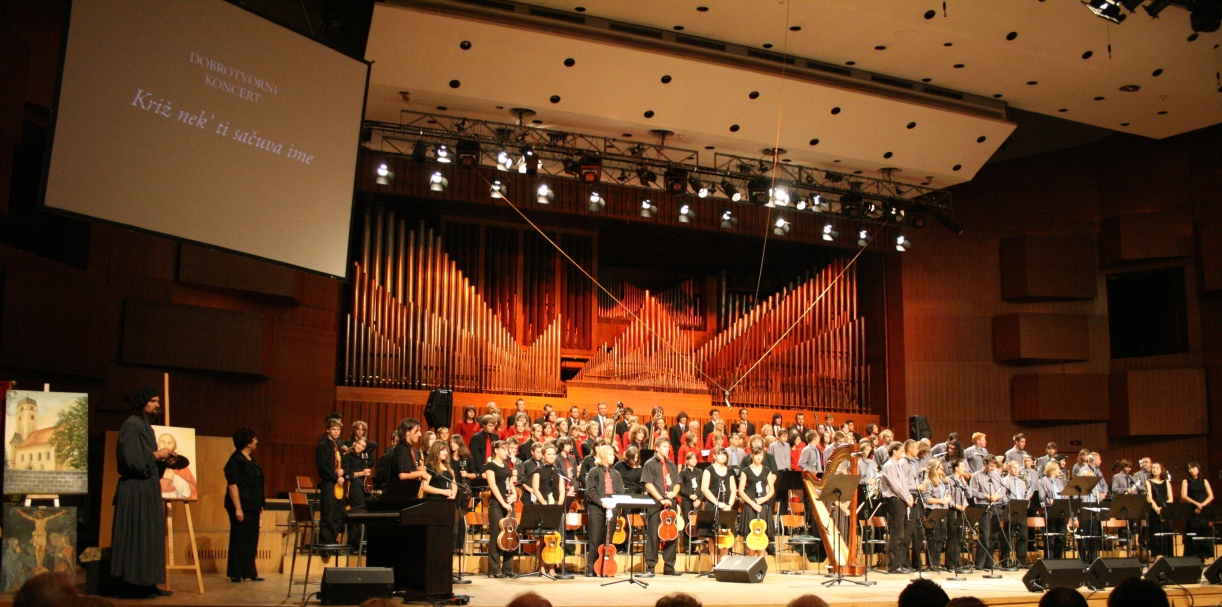
Grand hall's main stage.

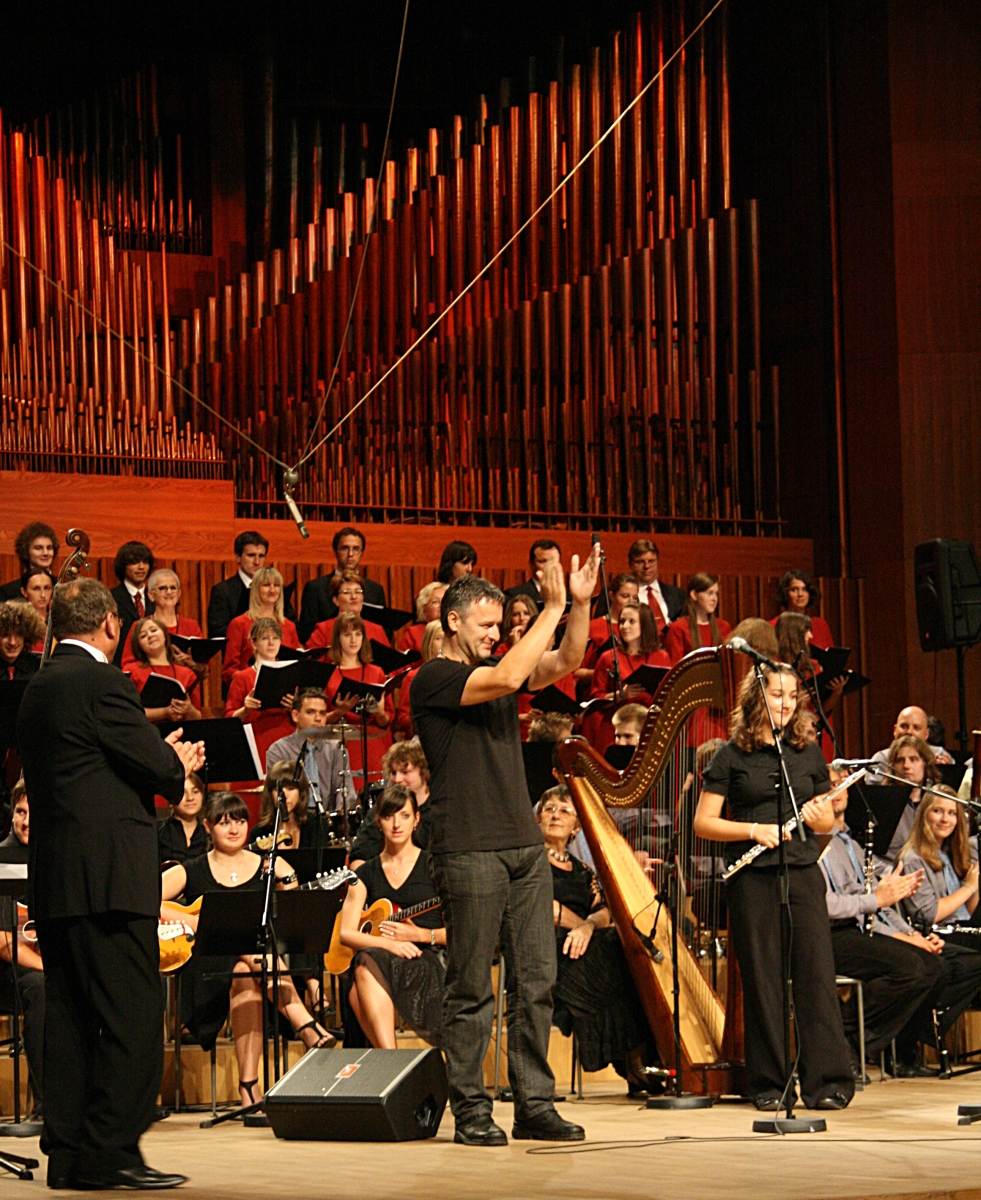
Marko Perković Thompson, 2008

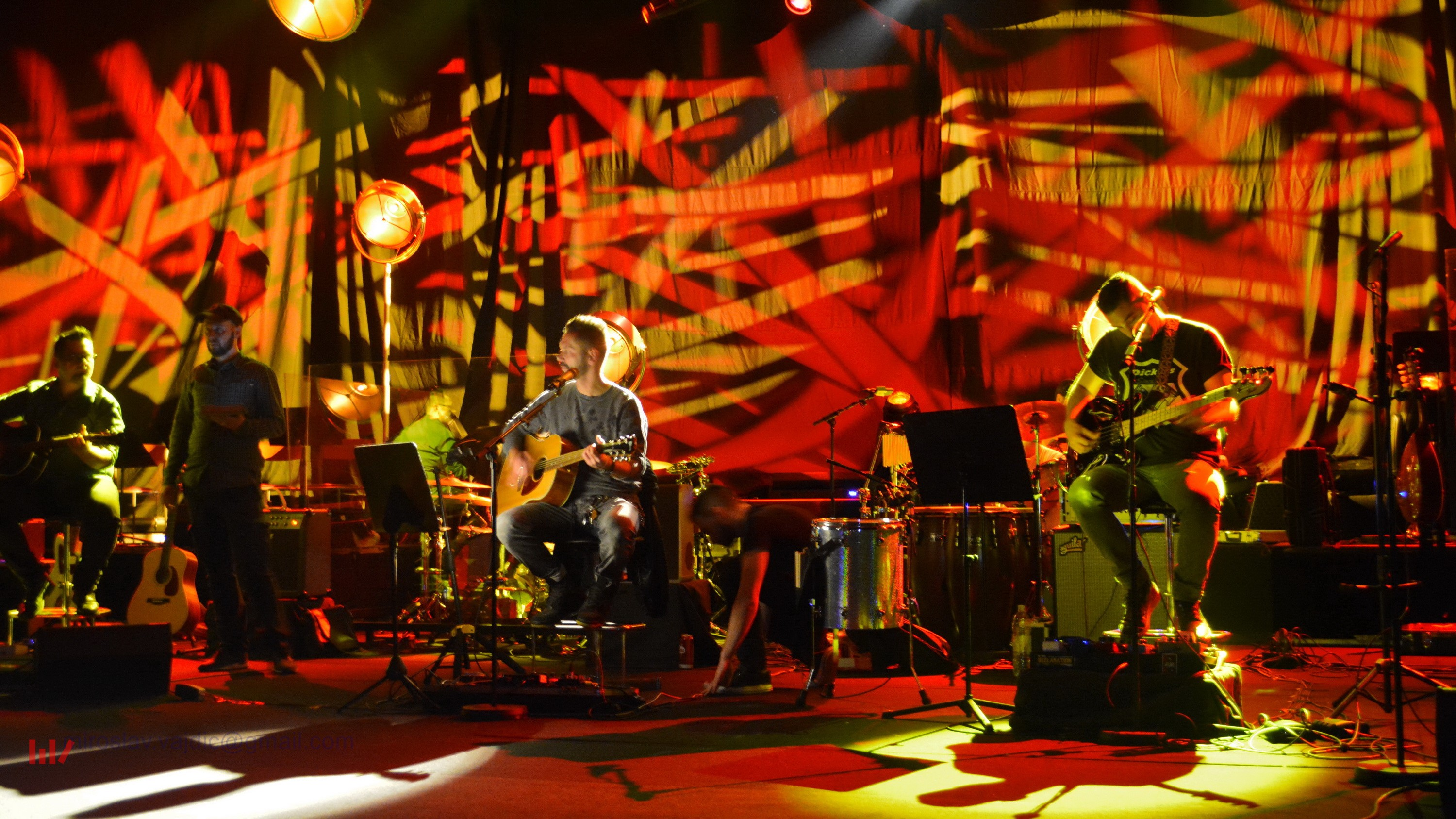
Vatra, 2016

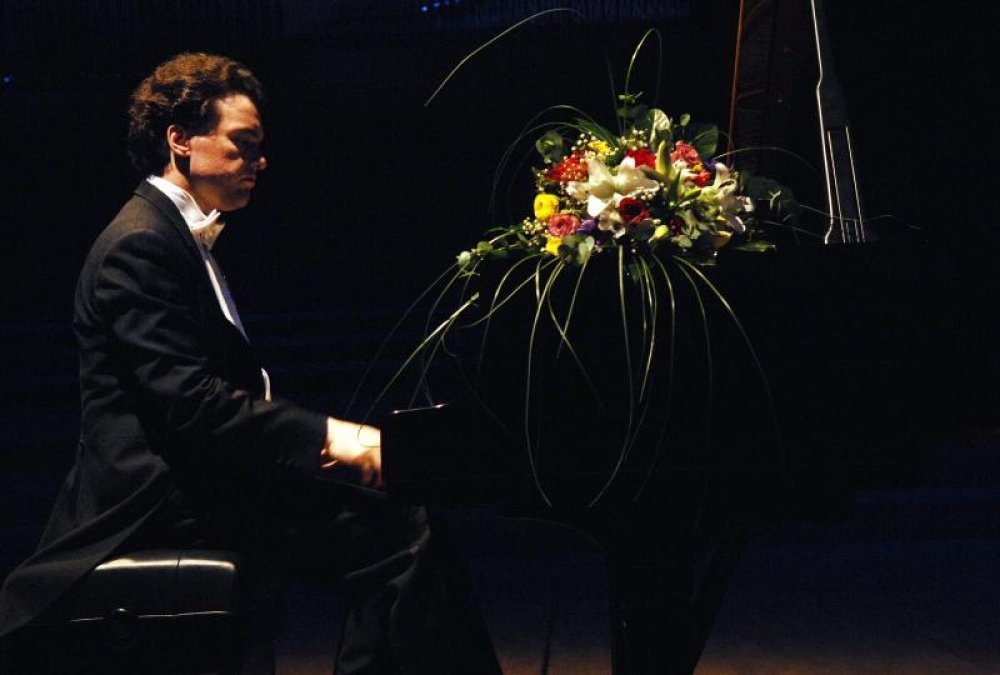
Pianist Evgeny Kissin, 2010

== See also ==
- List of concert halls

Preceded by Palais de Beaulieu; Lausanne	Eurovision Song Contest; Venue; 1990	Succeeded by Cinecittà; Rome
