= William Bauer =

William Bauer may refer to:

- Bill Bauer (American football), American football coach
- Bill Bauer (poet) (1932–2010), Canadian poet
- Billy Bauer (1915–2005), American musician
- William Edward Bauer (1926–2023), Canadian diplomat
- William J. Bauer (1926–2025), American judge
- William W. Bauer (1892–1967), American physician and health writer

== Fictional characters ==
- Billy Bauer, in the UK science fiction anthology TV series Black Mirror, played by Topher Grace

== See also ==
- Willy Bauer, German motocross racer
