= Daniel Bauer =

Daniel Bauer may refer to:

- Daniel Bauer (footballer) (born 1982), German professional footballer
- Daniel Bauer (make-up artist) (born 1976), Australian make-up artist
- Daniel J. Bauer (born 1973), American statistician

== See also ==
- Bauer (surname)
- Daniel Baur (born 1999), Scottish footballer
