= Robert Bauer (disambiguation) =

Robert Bauer (born 1952) is an American attorney who served as White House Counsel in the administration of President Barack Obama.

Robert Bauer may also refer to:

- Bob Bauer (baseball) (1930–2020), American minor league baseball player and manager
- Bobby Bauer (1915–1964), Canadian hockey player
- Robert Albert Bauer (1910–2003), US Foreign Service Officer, anti-Nazi radio broadcaster, VOA announcer and author
- Robert Bauer (mycologist) (1950–2014), German mycologist
- Robert Bauer (soldier) (1907–1996), German World War II soldier
- Robert Bauer (footballer) (born 1995), German football player
- Robert Bauer (linguist) (born 1946), American honorary linguistics professor at the University of Hong Kong
- Robert Bauer (actor), American actor and producer
- Robert Bauer (artist) (born 1942), American artist
- Bobby Bauer (1915–1964), Canadian ice hockey player

== See also ==
- Rob Bauer (born 1962), admiral in the Royal Netherlands Navy
- Bauer (surname)
