= Église Sainte-Marie de Calvi =

Church in Haute-Corse, France

Coordinates: 42°34′0″N 8°45′27″E

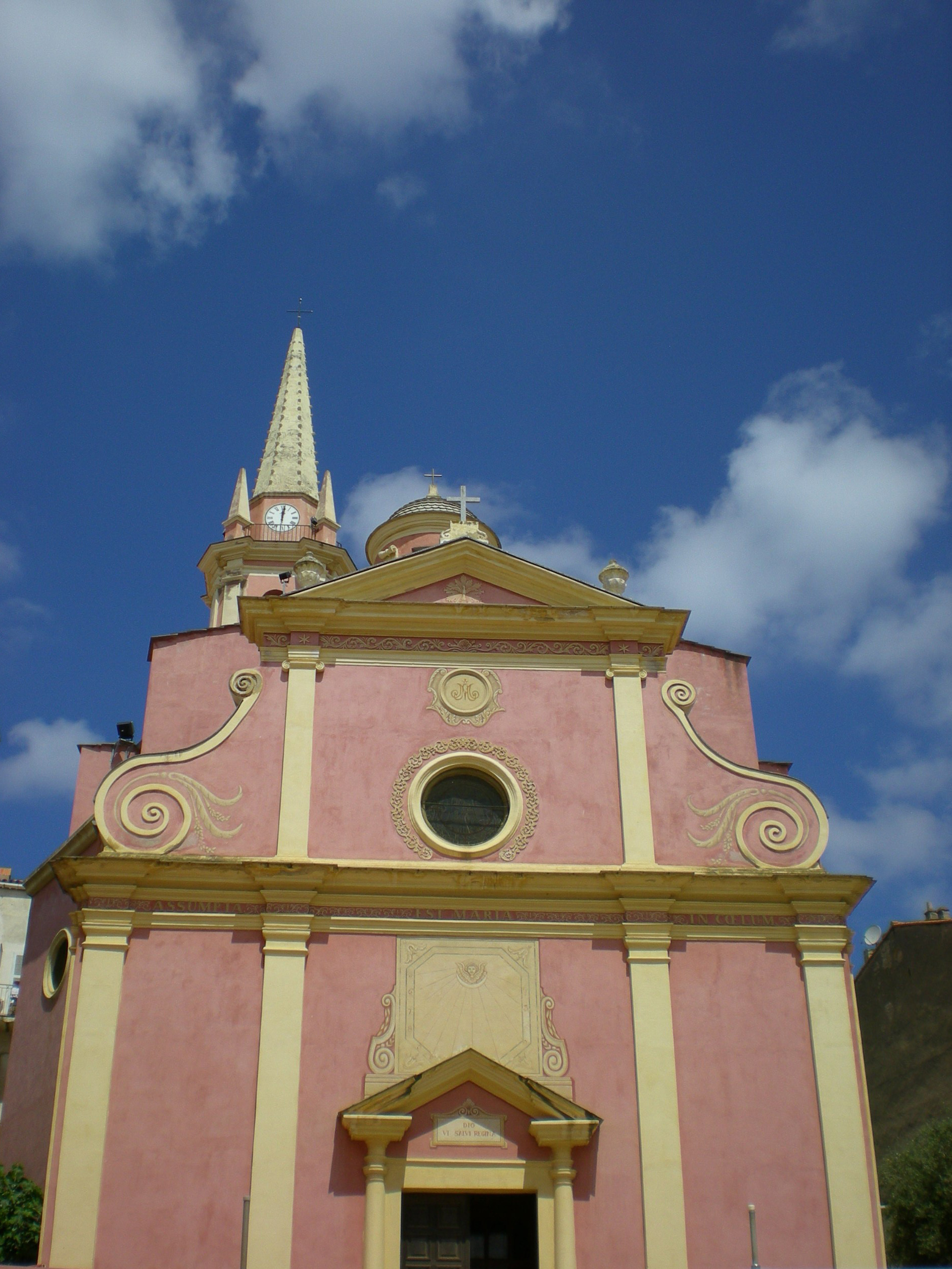

Église Sainte-Marie de Calvi is a church in Calvi, Haute-Corse, Corsica. The building was classified as a Historic Monument in 1988.
