= Peter Bauer =

Peter Bauer may refer to:

- Peter Matthew Bauer, American multi-instrumentalist, singer and songwriter
- Peter Michael Bauer (born 1982), American environmentalist and educator
- Peter Thomas Bauer (1915–2002), Hungarian-born British development economist
