= Ina Bauer =

Ina Bauer may refer to:

- Ina Bauer (figure skater) (1941–2014), German figure skater
- Ina Bauer (element), the skating move she invented
