= Rudolf Bauer =

Rudolf Bauer may refer to:

- Rudolf Bauer (artist) (1889–1953), German-born painter
- Rudolf Bauer (athlete) (1879–1932), Hungarian athlete
- Rudolf Bauer (politician) (born 1957), first President of the Košice Self-governing Region

== See also ==
- Rudolph Felix Bauer (1667–1717), Baltic German in Russian Empire military service
