= Thomas Bauer =

Thomas Bauer may refer to:

- Thomas Bauer (handballer) (born 1986), Austrian handball goalkeeper
- Thomas Bauer (speed skater) (born 1984), German short track speed skater
- Thomas Bauer (Arabist), German Arabist

== See also ==
- Tom Bauer (born 1946), American lawyer and politician from Missouri
- Tomáš Bauer (born 1932), Czech diver
