= Patrick Bauer =

Patrick Bauer may refer to:

- B. Patrick Bauer (born 1944), American politician
- Patrick Bauer (footballer) (born 1992), German football player
