= Catalina Bauer =

Chilean artist

Catalina Bauer Novoa, born in Buenos Aires on September 15, 1976, is a visual artist from Chile.

== Background and education ==
She received a degree in arts from the Universidad Finis Terrae, and later specialized at the Universidad de Chile, where she was a student of Eugenio Dittborn.

In 2007, Bauer won a scholarship that allowed her to do a three-month residency in Xalapa, Mexico, at the Xalapa Museum of Anthropology, where she further developed her skills in the fine arts. Bauer has also participated in an Artist Residency at Gasworks, London, in 2011

In 2012, she was invited to develop a project with the participation programme of the same institution. She participated in a six-month residency at the International Art Programme in Leipzig, Germany, in October 2014.

In 2018 she was the recipient of the Beca Arte, CCU - Corporación Cultural La Araucana (Art Grant, CCU - La Araucana Cultural Corporation).

== Artwork style ==
Bauer's makes use of mixed media from her everyday life and certain techniques in elementary crafts, such as braiding, weaving, and knitting. A majority of her media relied on the donation of supplies from members of the community, who were encouraged to participate in her programs Her art fuses ancient textile traditions with the Bauhaus principles of color, form and scale Her work displayed at Gasworks Gallery consisted of independent projects and exhibitions, as well as collaborative projects with members of the local community.

== Artwork and collaborations ==
She has worked with four other Chilean artists, Taller Bloc, is an artist-run space that has a very successful Tutorial Program. Bauer has been part of many national and international projects and exhibitions, such as; "Material Ligero", an itinerant project of exchange with the BLOC group: Margarette Lawrence Gallery, Melbourne, Australia in 2009 and AMA Museum, Washington DC, USA in 2011. “Techtonic Shift, Contemporary Art from Chile, from The Juan Yarur Collection”; Phillips de Pury & Company, Howick Place, London, UK. “Rewriting world”, IV Biennale of Contemporary Art in Moscow, Russia, “While is possible”, House of the Americas, Madrid, Spain in 2010.

Another one of Bauer's most famous pieces is at the Art Museum of the Americas. It is entitled Frivolité and is designed with the site's layout in mind. It has themes of femininity, which are demonstrated through the use of use of doilies and crochet handcrafts, which are often handmade by women in South American countries.
