= Peggy Bauer =

American wildlife photographer

Peggy Bauer (born Grace Margaret Reid, Chicago, Illinois; March 2, 1932 – March 23, 2004) was an American wildlife photographer whose work appeared in more than twenty-five books with her husband Erwin A. Bauer. They are the most published wildlife photographers in history.

Bauer attended college at Mount Holyoke in Massachusetts.
