= Antun Bauer =

Antun Bauer can refer to:

- Antun Bauer (archbishop) (1856–1937), Croatian theologian, philosopher and Archbishop
- Antun Bauer (museologist) (1911–2000), Croatian museologist and collector
- Anton-Martin Bauer (born 1963), Austrian Olympic equestrian
- Anton/Bauer, brand of video camera hardware from Videndum
