= Friedrich Bauer =

Friedrich Bauer may refer to:

- Friedrich Bauer (1903–1970), German type designer
- Friedrich L. Bauer (1924–2015), German computer scientist
- Friedrich Franz Bauer (1903–1972), German photographer
