= Herbert Bauer =

Herbert Bauer may refer to:

- Herbert Bauer (pilot) (1919–1997), German World War II pilot
- Béla Balázs (Herbert Bauer, 1884–1949), Hungarian-Jewish film critic
