= David Bauer =

David Bauer may refer to:

- David Bauer (actor) (1917–1973), American actor who made numerous appearances in ITC Entertainment productions
- David Bauer (ice hockey) (1924–1988), Canadian ice hockey player, coach and priest
- David Bauer (editor), managing editor of Sports Illustrated, former editor of Sport
