= Sven H. Bauer =

International Commissioner of the Svenska Scoutrådet

Sven H. Bauer served as the International Commissioner of the Svenska Scoutrådet, the Swedish national Scouting federation.

In 1978, Bauer was awarded the 125th Bronze Wolf, the only distinction of the World Organization of the Scout Movement, awarded by the World Scout Committee for exceptional services to world Scouting.
