= Talya Bauer =

American academic

Talya N. Bauer is the Endowed Cameron Professor of Management at Portland State University. She was president of the Society for Industrial and Organizational Psychology, former editor of the Journal of Management, and currently an associate editor for the Journal of Applied Psychology.

== Early life and education ==
Bauer completed her PhD in Business from the Krannert Graduate School at Purdue University, following a BA in Psychology at Cal Poly Humboldt.

== Career and research ==
Her work on "leader-member exchange", "overqualification", and "new employee socialization" has been covered in Harvard Business Review.

== Selected publications ==
- Wu, Chia-Huei; Weisman, Hannah; Sung, Li-Kuo; Erdogan, Berrin; Bauer, Talya N. (July 2022). "Perceived overqualification, felt organizational obligation, and extra-role behavior during the COVID-19 crisis: The moderating role of self-sacrificial leadership". Applied Psychology. 71 (3): 983–1013. doi:10.1111/apps.12371. hdl:10871/128692. ISSN 0269-994X.
- Ellis, Allison M.; Nifadkar, Sushil S.; Bauer, Talya N.; Erdogan, Berrin (2017-06-20). "Your New Hires Won't Succeed Unless You Onboard Them Properly". Harvard Business Review. ISSN 0017-8012.
- Bauer, Talya (2017). Principles of management 3.0. Jeremy Short, Berrin Erdogan, Mason Carpenter (Version 3.0 ed.). Boston, MA. ISBN 978-1-4533-7502-0. OCLC 1005842991.
- Bauer, Talya (2021). Fundamentals of human resource management : people, data, and analytics. Berrin Erdogan, David Ellis Caughlin, Donald M. Truxillo. Thousand Oaks, California. ISBN 978-1-5443-7772-8. OCLC 1110660370.
- Bauer, Talya N. (2010). Onboarding New Employees: Maximizing Success (PDF). SHRM Foundation. Archived from the original (PDF) on 2023-12-03.
