= William W. Bauer =

American physician and health writer (1892-1967)

- Born: William Waldo Bauer; 1892
- Died: 1967 (aged 74–75)
- Occupation: physician

William Waldo Bauer (July 23, 1892 - December 25, 1967) was an American physician and health writer.

== Career ==
Bauer was born in Milwaukee. He obtained his B.S. from the University of Wisconsin (1915) and M.D. from the University of Pennsylvania (1917). He married Florence Ann Marvyne on February 8, 1920. He was a lieutenant in the U.S. Army Medical Corps during World War I and remained as a Major until 1921.

He conducted private medical practice in Boise, Idaho and Milwaukee. From 1923 to 1931, Bauer was health commissioner of Racine, Wisconsin. He was later appointed assistant director of the American Medical Association's Bureau of Health Education in Chicago. He advanced to the director where he remained until his retirement in 1961 as director emeritus. From 1928 to 1930 he was a staff member of the Wisconsin Anti-Tuberculosis Association and secretary of the Racine Tuberculosis Society from 1923 to 1931.

Bauer was an advocate of good nutrition, healthy eating and a balanced diet. He was critical of food fads and debunked them in his books. His books received positive reviews in medical journals.

== Publications ==
- Contagious Diseases: What They Are and How to Deal With Them (1934)
- Health Education of the Public (1937) [with Thomas G. Hull]
- Health Questions Answered (1937)
- Health, Hygiene and Hooey (1938)
- Americans, Live Longer (1940)
- Contagious Diseases: A Guide for Parents (1944)
- Eat What You Want!: A Sensible Guide to Good Health Through Good Eating (1945)
- Stop Annoying Your Children (1948)
- Santa Claus, M.D. (1950)
- Guidebook for Just Like Me: Picture Primer in Health and Safety (1957)
- The Basic Health and Safety Program (1957)
- Moving into Manhood (1963) [foreword by Morris Fishbein]
- Your Health Today (1965) [with Warren E. Schaller]
- All You Need to Know About Insomnia, Sleep, and Dreams (1967)
- The Human Story: Facts on Birth, Growth, and Reproduction (1967)
- Potions, Remedies, and Old Wives' Tales (1969)
