= Marijan Haberle =

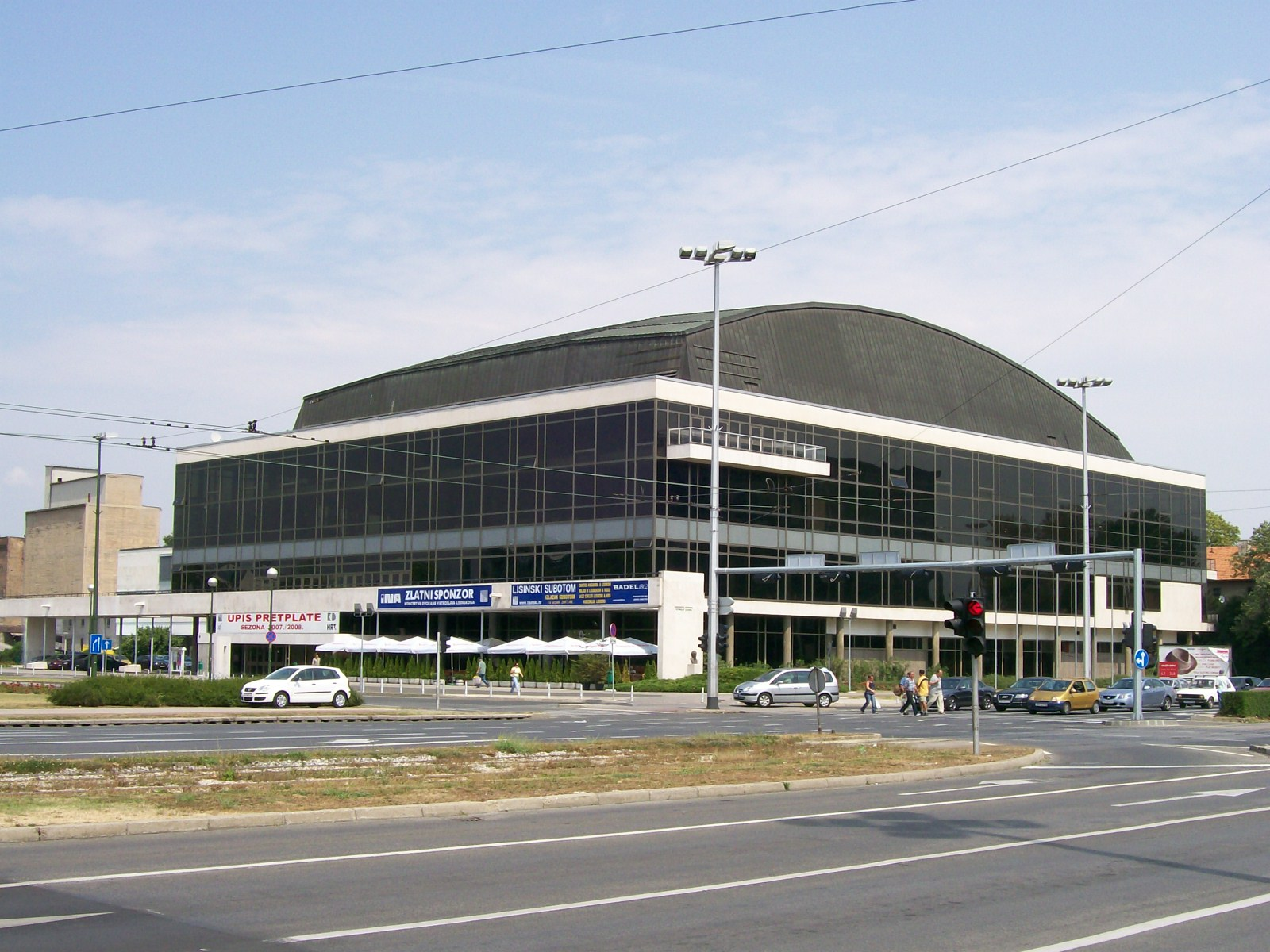
Concert hall

Marijan Haberle (May 16, 1908 in Zagreb – March 20, 1979 in Rijeka) was a Croatian architect. His best known work is the Concert Hall Vatroslav Lisinski in Zagreb.

== Literature ==
- Horvat, Tea. Arhitektura od 1945.-1960., Socrealizam te nova pravila poslijeratne hrvatske arhitekture, u Nekretnine 3, listopad 2007.
- Radović-Mahečić, Darja. Moderna arhitektura u Hrvatskoj 30'ih, Sajamski kompleks Zagrebački zbor, Zagreb, Školska knjiga, IPU, 2007.
- Ivančević, Radovan. Arhitektura i urbanizam, u Stilovi razdoblja život III, Umjetnost 20.st. Zagreb, 2001., Profil
- Premerl, T. u 20 godina Koncertne dvorane 'Vatroslav Lisinski, Lovro Lisičić (ur.), Zagreb, 1993.
- Martinčević, J. u 20 godina koncertne dvorane 'Vatroslav Lisinski, Lovro Lisičić (ur.), Zagreb,1993., pp. 33.-36.
- Premerl, Tomislav. Graditelj kontinuiteta moderne Marijan Haberle, Arhitektura 172–173, Zagreb, 1980.
