= John Bauer =

John Bauer may refer to:

- John Bauer (illustrator) (1882–1918), Swedish painter and illustrator
- John Bauer (potter) (born 1978), South African ceramicist and artist
- John Bauer (American painter) (born 1971), American artist
- John Bauer (skier) (born 1969), American cross country skier
- John Bauer (American football) (1932–2010), American football guard and tackle

== See also ==
- Jack Bauer (disambiguation)
- John Bower (disambiguation)
