= Andreas Bauer =

Andreas Bauer may refer to:

- Andreas Friedrich Bauer (1783–1860), German engineer
- Andreas Bauer (ski jumper) (born 1964), German former ski jumper
- Andreas Bauer Kanabas, German operatic bass, until December 2018 Andreas Bauer
- Andreas Bauer (boxer) (born 1960), German Olympic boxer
- Andreas Bauer (rugby league) (born 1982), rugby league player
- Andreas Bauer (footballer) (born 1985), Austrian footballer
