= Joy Bauer =

American nutritionist

Joy Bauer, MS, RD, CDN
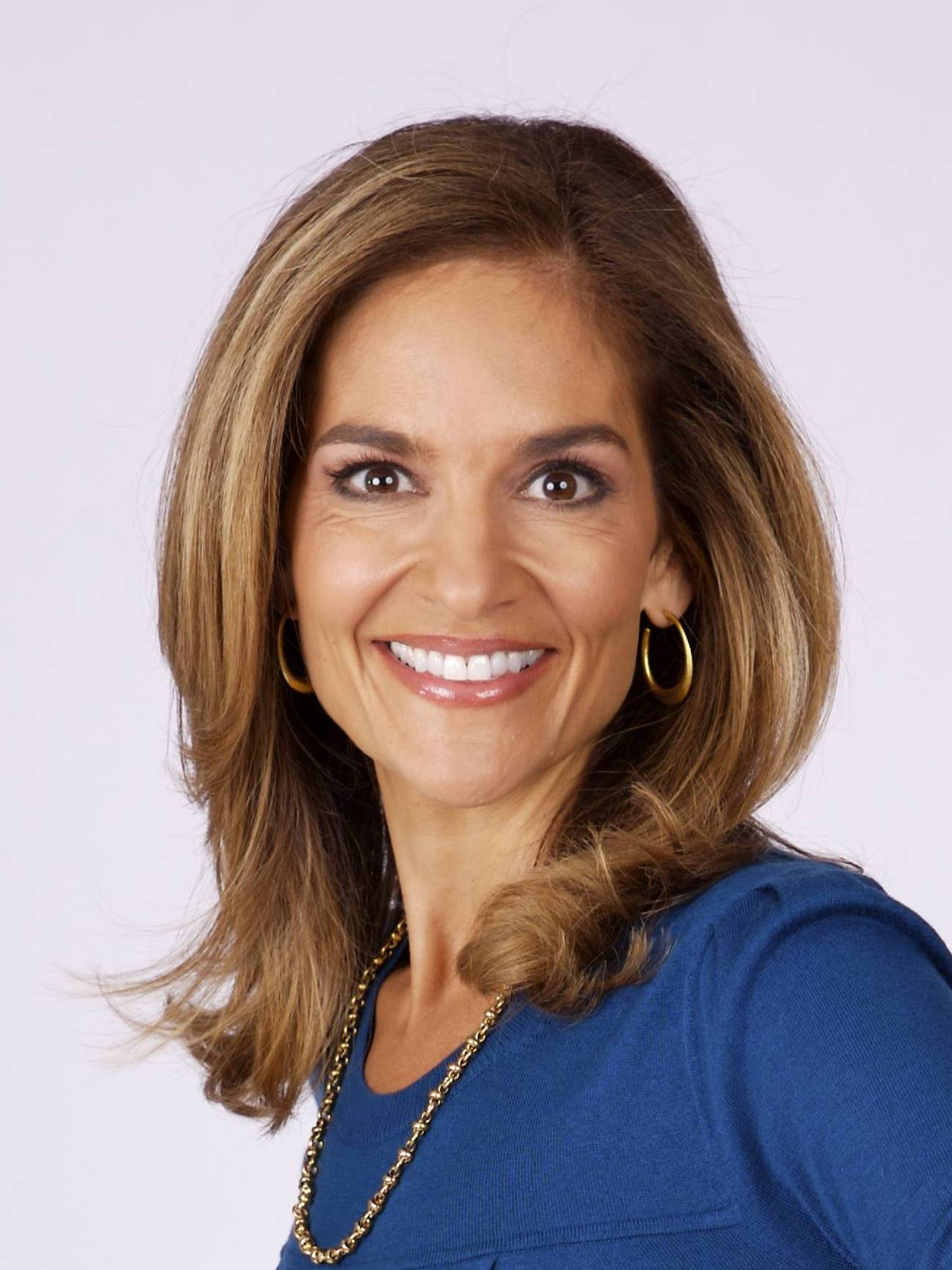
- Joy Bauer, RD
- Born: November 6, 1963 (age 63)
- Occupation: Nutritionist
- Television: The Today Show
- Website: http://joybauer.com/

Joy Bauer is a nutritionist for NBC, seen on the TODAY show and on NBC News Daily. She is also the author of numerous books and articles on nutrition and lifestyle topics.

== Biography ==
Bauer received her bachelor's degree in Kinesiological Sciences from the University of Maryland, College Park and a master of science in nutrition from New York University.

Bauer began her career at Mount Sinai Medical Center in New York City as the clinical nutritionist with their neurosurgical team. She taught Anatomy & Physiology and Sports Nutrition at New York University School of Professional Studies. She served as the Director for Nutrition for the Pediatric Cardiology Department at Mount Sinai Medical Center. While at Mount Sinai, Bauer created and implemented "Heart-Smart Kids," a health program for underprivileged children living in Harlem.

Bauer served as nutrition consultant for the Columbia Presbyterian Medical Center. She was a nutritionist at New York University, and was the founder and CEO of Joy Bauer Nutrition.

Bauer has received several awards, including the National Media Excellence Award from the Academy of Nutrition and Dietetics in 2010 and the American Society of Nutrition Science in 2012.

== Family life ==
Bauer lives in New York with her husband, Ian, and their three children. Bauer is Jewish.

== Books and publications ==
Bauer is the author of a number of health books, cookbooks and diet books, including:

- Joy Bauer's Superfood! (Abrams, April 2020)
- Yummy Yoga (Abrams Books for Young Readers, October 2019)
- Joy's Simple Food Remedies (Hay House, October 2018)
- From Junk Food to Joy Food (Hay House, February 2016)
- The Joy Fit Club Cookbook, Diet Plan & Inspiration (Houghton Mifflin Harcourt; 2012)
- Joy Bauer's Food Cures (ISBN 978-1-60-961312-9) was reviewed by the American Dietetic Association and called "a common-sense, fad-free approach to using food to improve your health and feel your best." Originally published in 2007, it was revised and reissued in 2011.
- Slim & Scrumptious (William Morrow Cookbooks; 2010)
- Your Inner Skinny: Four Steps to Thin Forever (William Morrow; 2009) was reviewed in the Chicago Tribune
- Joy's LIFE Diet (ISBN 978-0-06-166574-5), a book reviewed in Publishers Weekly, January 2009, and placed No. 1 on the April 29, 2007, New York Times Bestseller Paperback How To List.
- Prevention 3-2-1 Weight Loss Plan (Rodale Books; 2007)
- The 90/10 Weight Loss Cookbook (St. Martin's Griffin; 2004)
- Cooking with Joy: The 90/10 Cookbook (St. Martin's Press; 2004)
- The 90/10 Weight Loss Plan (St. Martin's Griffin; 2001)
- The Complete Idiot's Guide to Total Nutrition (Alpha; 1999)
- The Complete Idiot's Guide to Eating Smart (Alpha; 1996)

== Professional affiliations ==
- Commission on Dietetic Registration: Registered Dietitian
- New York State Certified Dietitian–Nutritionist
- Academy of Nutrition and Dietetics, Sports & Cardiovascular Nutritionist Group
- Academy of Nutrition and Dietetics, Pediatric Practice Group
- NBC’s TODAY Show, Nutrition and Health Expert
- Nourish Snacks, Founder
- Contributing Editor/Columnist, Woman’s Day Magazine
- New York City Ballet, Nutritionist
- Alzheimer's Foundation of America
- Alliance for a Healthier Generation
- Founder, beJOYLY Supplements
