= Heinrich Bauer =

Heinrich Bauer may refer to:

- Heinrich Bauer (revolutionary) (1813–?), German revolutionary, shoemaker
- Heinrich Bauer (politician) (1874–1927), Estonian politician
