= Lisa Bauer =

Canadian field hockey player

Lisa Bauer (born 13 May 1960 in Waterloo, Ontario) is a Canadian former field hockey player who competed in the 1984 Summer Olympics.
