= Hans F. Bauer =

American research chemist (1932–2009)

- Born: 1932; Hollywood, Los Angeles, California, U.S.
- Died: 6 February 2009, 2009 (aged 76–77); Costa Mesa, California, U.S.
- Education: University of California, Los Angeles
- Scientific career
- Fields: Chemistry

Hans F. Bauer (1932 in Hollywood, California – 6 February 2009 in Costa Mesa, California) was an American research chemist. He was married and had 4 children.

== Career ==
Bauer received a B.S. degree in Chemistry in 1954 from the University of California, Los Angeles. He served in the United States Navy for 2 years after receiving his undergraduate degree (1954–1956). He was discharged with the rank of Lieutenant (j.g.), and then returned to UCLA to work on a Ph.D. degree in chemistry, which he received in 1960.

Bauer worked for several large chemical and research companies in the US, including Occidental Petroleum, and the United States Department of Energy.

== Honors and awards ==
Bauer held several US patents, including:

- 4087514 ( 2 May 1978) - Process for desulfurizing char
- 4155715 (22 May 1979) - Process for reducing organic content of char
- 4301137 (17 Nov 1981) - Removal of chlorine from pyrolysis vapors
- 5164054 (17 Nov 1992) - Low-cost process for hydrogen production
- 5198084 (30 Mar 1993) - Low-cost process for hydrogen production

The latter 2 patents described methods for producing molecular hydrogen from a mixture of hydrocarbon vapor and a source of carbon, in which the mixture is agitated by electromagnetic radiation.
