= Jack Bauer (disambiguation) =

Jack Bauer is a character from the TV series 24.

Jack Bauer may also refer to:

- Jack Bauer (cyclist) (born 1985), New Zealand road racing cyclist
- K. Jack Bauer (1926–1987), American naval historian
- Jack Bauer, the antagonist from the 2001 film Zebra Lounge.

== See also ==
- John Bauer (disambiguation)
