= Belinda Bauer =

Belinda Bauer may refer to:

- Belinda Bauer (actress) (born 1950), Australian actress
- Belinda Bauer (author) (born 1962), British writer
