= Cirque Plume =

French contemporary circus company

Origin
- Country: France
- Founder(s): Bernard Kudlak
- Year founded: 1984

Information
- Director: Bernard Kudlak
- Traveling show?: Yes
- Circus tent?: Yes
- Winter quarters: Besançon, France
- Website: www.cirqueplume.com dead link

Cirque Plume is a contemporary circus company founded in 1984 by Bernard Kudlak in the Franche-Comté region of France.

French newspaper Le Parisien has described Cirque Plume as "the oldest of the New Circuses... It is one of the rare troupes who seem to be able to reconcile both the children, numerous in the audience... and adults, uncomfortable with the traditional circus, but who are rather in search of a certain atmosphere." According to Le Figaro, "The word circus here is what you see and what you get. The techniques of juggling, acrobatics or flying trapeze are totally respected. Their chief originality is the way in which they are all brought into the gigantic mixer."

In 2018, Cirque Plume performed one last time in Paris, showing La dernière saison at the Grande Halle de La Villette from September 26 to December 30, marking its final Paris performances. The troupe planned to retire in late 2020 after farewell shows in its hometown of Besançon.

On September 18, 2020, impacted by the COVID-19 pandemic, the circus announced the cancellation of its final season, initially scheduled for October to December 2020.

== History ==
- 1984: Cirque Plume is founded
- 1986: Avignon "Off" Theatre Festival
- 1988: Spectacle de Cirque et de Merveilles
- 1990: Grand Prix national du cirque
- 1991: No Animo Mas Anima
- 1993: Toiles
- 1996: L'harmonie est elle municipale?
- 1999: Mélanges (opéra plume)
- 2001: First performance in New York City, USA
- 2002: Récréation
- 2004: Plic Ploc
- 2009: L'Atelier du Peintre
- 2013: Tempus fugit? Une ballade sur le chemin perdu

== See also ==
- Nouveau cirque

== Bibliography ==
- Kudlak, Bernard (2014). Abécédaire du Cirque Plume. Besançon: SOACD-Cirque Plume. ISBN 978-2-9515498-5-2.
- Bauer, Sébastien (2014). Au fil de la Plume: Tempus fugit ? la 10e création du Cirque Plume vue par un dessinateur. S.l.: Editions SO.A.C.D. ISBN 978-2-9515498-4-5.
- Kudlak, Bernard; David-Gibert, Gwénola (2010). Cirque Plume: entretien avec Bernard Kudlak. Quel cirque?. Centre national des arts du cirque (France). Arles : [Châlons-en-Champagne]: Actes sud; CNAC. ISBN 978-2-7427-8744-9.
- Kudlak, Bernard; Voisin, Anthony (2006). Cirque Plume: carnets de création de Plic Ploc. Paris: éd. du Layeur. ISBN 978-2-915118-53-7.
