= Harald Bauer =

German politician (born 1949)

Member of the Bundestag
- In office 3 October 1990 – 20 December 1990

Personal details
- Born: 24 April 1949 (age 77) Langendorf, Saxony-Anhalt
- Party: CDU

Harald Bauer (born 24 April 1949) is a German politician of the Christian Democratic Union (CDU) and former member of the German Bundestag.

== Life ==
Bauer had been a member of the GDR CDU since 1968 and was a member of the Langendorf Municipal Council from 1969 to 1973. From 1974 to 1979, he was a member of the CDU district executive in Wernigerode and the city council in Ilsenburg. From 1979 to 1988, he was a member of the CDU Magdeburg-Mitte district executive and the Magdeburg-Mitte district assembly. From 1988 to 1990, he was a member of the CDU Burg district executive. From 1994, he was a member of the CDU Magdeburg district executive.

In March 1990, Bauer was elected to the People's Chamber for the CDU in the Magdeburg constituency. In October 1990, he was one of the 144 members of parliament sent to the Bundestag by the Volkskammer. He was a member of the Bundestag until December 1990.

== Literature ==
Herbst, Ludolf; Jahn, Bruno (2002). Vierhaus, Rudolf (ed.). Biographisches Handbuch der Mitglieder des Deutschen Bundestages. 1949–2002 [Biographical Handbook of the Members of the German Bundestag. 1949–2002] (in German). München: De Gruyter - De Gruyter Saur. p. 1715. ISBN 978-3-11-184511-1.
