= Lorna Bauer =

Canadian artist

Lorna Bauer (born 1980 in Toronto) is a Canadian artist currently residing and working in Montreal, Quebec.

Bauer received a BFA degree from Concordia University, Montreal in 2005. She has incorporated glass blowing, photography and installation practices in her work. Her work is included in the collections of the Musée national des beaux-arts du Québec and the Musée d'art contemporain de Montréal.

Bauer was a finalist for the Sobey Art Award in 2021.
