= Siegfried Bauer =

German physicist and professor (1961–2018)

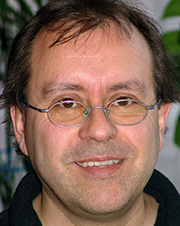
Siegfried Bauer in 2010

Siegfried Bauer (15 May 1961 – 30 December 2018) was a German physicist and professor for soft-matter physics at Johannes Kepler University Linz, Austria. In 2016, he was elected Fellow of the Institute of Electrical and Electronics Engineers (IEEE) for contributions to the understanding and application of electroactive polymer dielectrics. In 2018, he was named Fellow of the Society of Photo-Instrumentation Engineers (SPIE) "for achievements in plastic electronic devices and soft-matter physics".
