= Gustav Bauer (disambiguation) =

Gustav Bauer (1870–1944) was a German politician.

Gustav Bauer or Gustave Bauer may also refer to:

- Gustav Conrad Bauer (1820–1906), German mathematician
- Gustave Bauer (1884–1947), American wrestler
