= Michael Bauer (officer) =

WW2 German Army officer (1895-1943)

- Born: 24 November 1895; Herzogenaurach
- Died: 15 February 1943 (aged 47); Sclobodka, Russia
- Military career
- Allegiance: German Empire (to 1918); Weimar Republic (to 1919); Nazi Germany
- Branch: Heer
- Service years: 1914–1919; 1935–1943
- Rank: Oberst
- Commands: Infanterie-Regiment 499; Grenadier-Regiment 488
- Conflicts: World War I World War II: Battle of France; Operation Barbarossa; Battle of Białystok–Minsk; Battle of Smolensk (1941); Battle of Moscow
- Awards: Knight's Cross of the Iron Cross

Johann Michael Bauer (24 November 1895 – 15 February 1943) was a highly decorated Oberst in the Wehrmacht during World War II. He was also a recipient of the Knight's Cross of the Iron Cross. Michael Bauer suffered a stroke on 3 February 1943 and died on 15 February 1943 in Sclobodka, Russia.

== Awards and decorations ==
- Iron Cross (1914)
  - 2nd Class (22 October 1914)
  - 1st Class (23 September 1918)
- Wound Badge (1914)
  - in Black
- Honour Cross of the World War 1914/1918
- Clasp to the Iron Cross (1939)
  - 2nd Class (29 June 1940)
  - 1st Class (2 July 1940)
- German Cross in Gold on 26 December 1941 as Major in the III./Infanterie-Regiment 499
- Knight's Cross of the Iron Cross on 2 February 1942 as Major and commander of the I./Infanterie-Regiment 499
