= Michael W. Bauer =

German political scientist

Michael W. Bauer (born August 16, 1969, in Mannheim) is a German political scientist specializing in the area public administration and public policy. He is a professor at the German University of Administrative Sciences Speyer.

== Academic career ==
Michael Bauer studied social sciences, German philology, and modern German history at the Universities of Mannheim, Frankfurt am Main, Vienna, and Berlin from 1990 to 1996. In 1996 he graduated from the Humboldt-University Berlin with a Diploma in social sciences. From 1996 to 1997 he completed the masters programme for European political science and public administration at the renowned College of Europe in Bruges. From 1997 to 2000 he did his doctorate on the implementation of EU structural policy at the European University Institute in Florence under the supervision of Adrienne Héritier.

After working as a research fellow at the Max Planck Institute for Research on Collective Goods and as an expert in EU affairs in the Hessian Government, Bauer became assistant professor for comparative policy analysis and public administration at the University Konstanz. There, he habilitated in 2008 and obtained the venia legendi – the permission to teach at universities in Germany - for political science and public administration.

In 2009 Bauer succeeded Hellmut Wollmann to become Professor for politics and public administration at the Department of Social Sciences at the Humboldt-University Berlin. Then, in 2012, after declining offers for professorships at the Christian-Albrechts-University Kiel, the University Konstanz, and the University Potsdam, Bauer accepted the professorship for comparative public administration and policy-analysis at the German University of Administrative Sciences Speyer. For his efforts in teaching and research concerning European unification, Bauer was awarded the honor of a Jean Monnet Professorship by the European Union in 2013. Michael Bauer is also visiting professor at the Universidade A Coruña, the Instituto Superior De Ciências do Trabalho e da Empresa (ISCTE) of the Instituto Universitário de Lisboa, and the Turkish-German University Istanbul.

Bauer's research focuses on comparative public administration and EU policy analysis. In particular, he investigates questions regarding the EU administration, international bureaucracies, and government in multi-level systems.

Bauer also serves on the editorial board of numerous national and international professional journals, such as the International Journal of Public Administration, Public Policy and Administration, West European Politics, and der moderne staat.

== Selected Publication ==
- Bauer, Michael W., Christoph Knill, and Steffen Eckhard, eds. 2017. International Bureaucracy: Challenges and Lessons for Public Administration Research. London/ New York: Palgrave Macmillan.
- Knill, Christoph, and Michael W. Bauer, guest editors. 2016. Governance by International Public Administrations? Tools of Bureaucratic Influence and Effects on Global Public Policies. Journal of European Public Policy, Special Issue, Vol. 23, No. 7.
- Tatham, Michaël, and Michael W. Bauer. 2016. “The State, the Economy, and the Regions: Theories of Preference Formation in Times of Crisis.” Journal of Public Administration Research and Theory 26 (4): 631–46.
- Bauer, Michael W., and Jarle Trondal, eds. 2015. The Palgrave Handbook of the European Administrative System. London/ New York: Palgrave Macmillan.
- Bauer, Michael W., and Stefan Becker. 2014. “The Unexpected Winner of the Crisis: The European Commission’s Strengthened Role in Economic Governance.” Journal of European Integration 36 (3): 213–29.
- Bauer, Michael W., and Christoph Knill. 2014. “A Conceptual Framework for the Comparative Analysis of Policy Change: Measurement, Explanation and Strategies of Policy Dismantling.” Journal of Comparative Policy Analysis: Research and Practice 16 (1): 28–44.
- Bauer, Michael W., Andrew Jordan, Christoffer Green-Pedersen, and Adrienne Héritier, eds. 2012. Dismantling Public Policy: Preferences, Strategies, and Effects. Oxford: Oxford University Press.
- Bauer, Michael W., guest editor. 2008. Reforming the European Commission. Special Issue, Journal of European Public Policy, Vol. 15, No. 5. [also published as Bauer, Michael W., ed. 2009. Reforming the European Commission, London: Routledge].
- Bauer, Michael W., and Christoph Knill, eds. 2007. Management Reforms in International Organizations. Baden-Baden: Nomos.
- Bauer, Michael W. 2002. “Limitations to Agency Control in EU Policy-Making. The Commission and the Poverty Programmes.” Journal of Common Market Studies 40 (3): 381–400.
- Schmitter, Philippe C., and Michael W. Bauer. 2001. “A (Modest) Proposal for Expanding Social Citizenship in the European Union.” Journal of European Social Policy 11 (1): 55–65.
