= Maximilian Bauer =

Maximilian Bauer may refer to:

- Maximilian Bauer (footballer, born 1995), German footballer
- Maximilian Bauer (footballer, born 2000), German footballer

== See also ==
- Max Bauer (1869–1929), German World War I officer
- Maximilian Bayer (1872–1917), founder of Scouting in Germany
