= Festival du Vent =

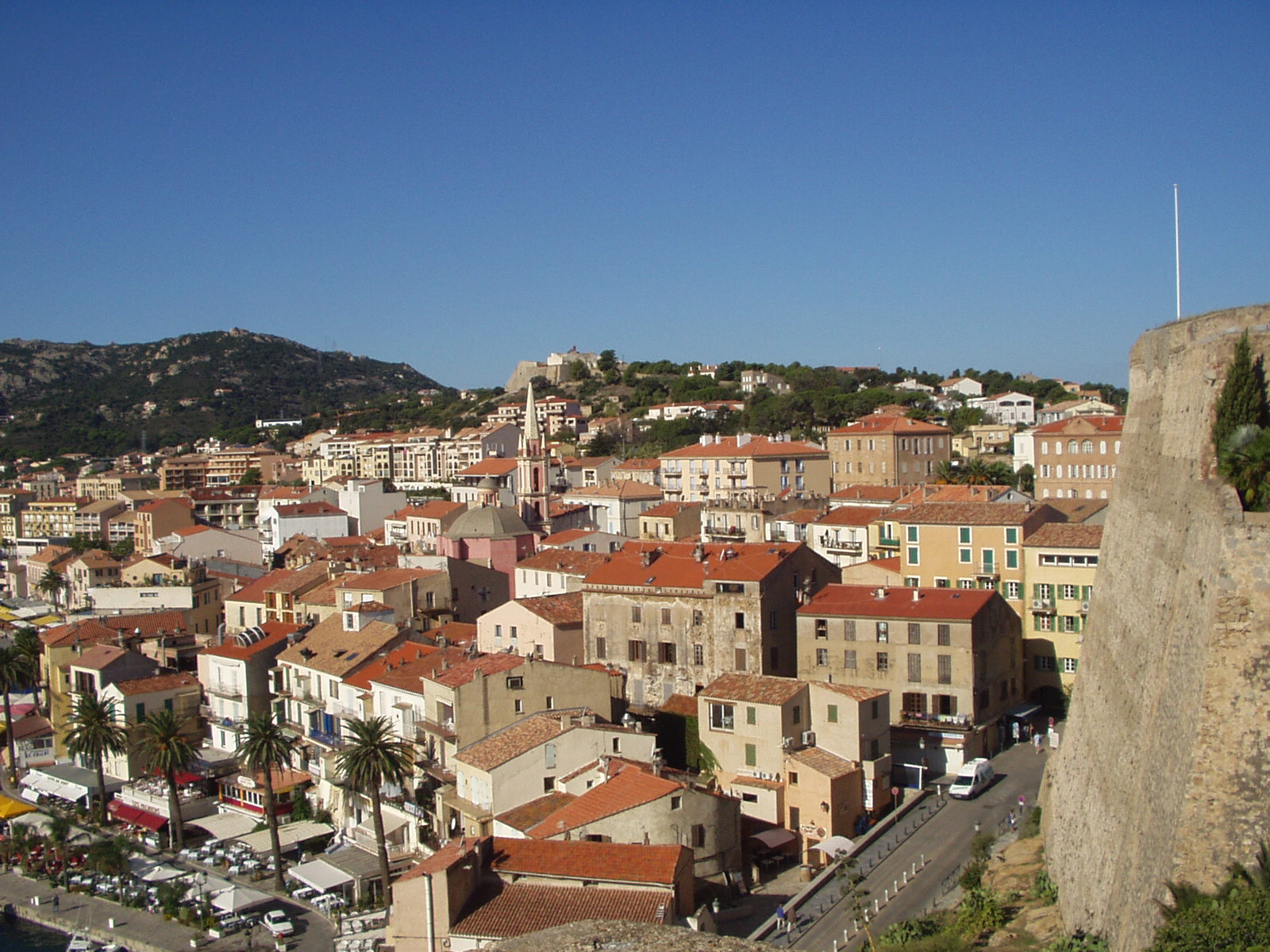
Calvi, the town where the festival takes place.

The Festival du Vent (English: Festival of the Wind) was an annual arts festival taking place since 1992 in Calvi, Haute-Corse, a town of Corsica, in France.

The Festival du Vent took place since 1992 between October and November. It was regarded as one of the main festivals of Calvi. Every year more than six hundred people worked to prepare the features of festival. The festival included music concerts of all genres, theatre and art exhibitions, paragliding, windsurfing and sailing.

The 22nd and final edition was held in 2013 from 23rd to 27th of October.
