= Torra di Calvi =

Genoese coastal defence tower in Corsica

Tower of Calvi
- Torra di Calvi (Corsican)
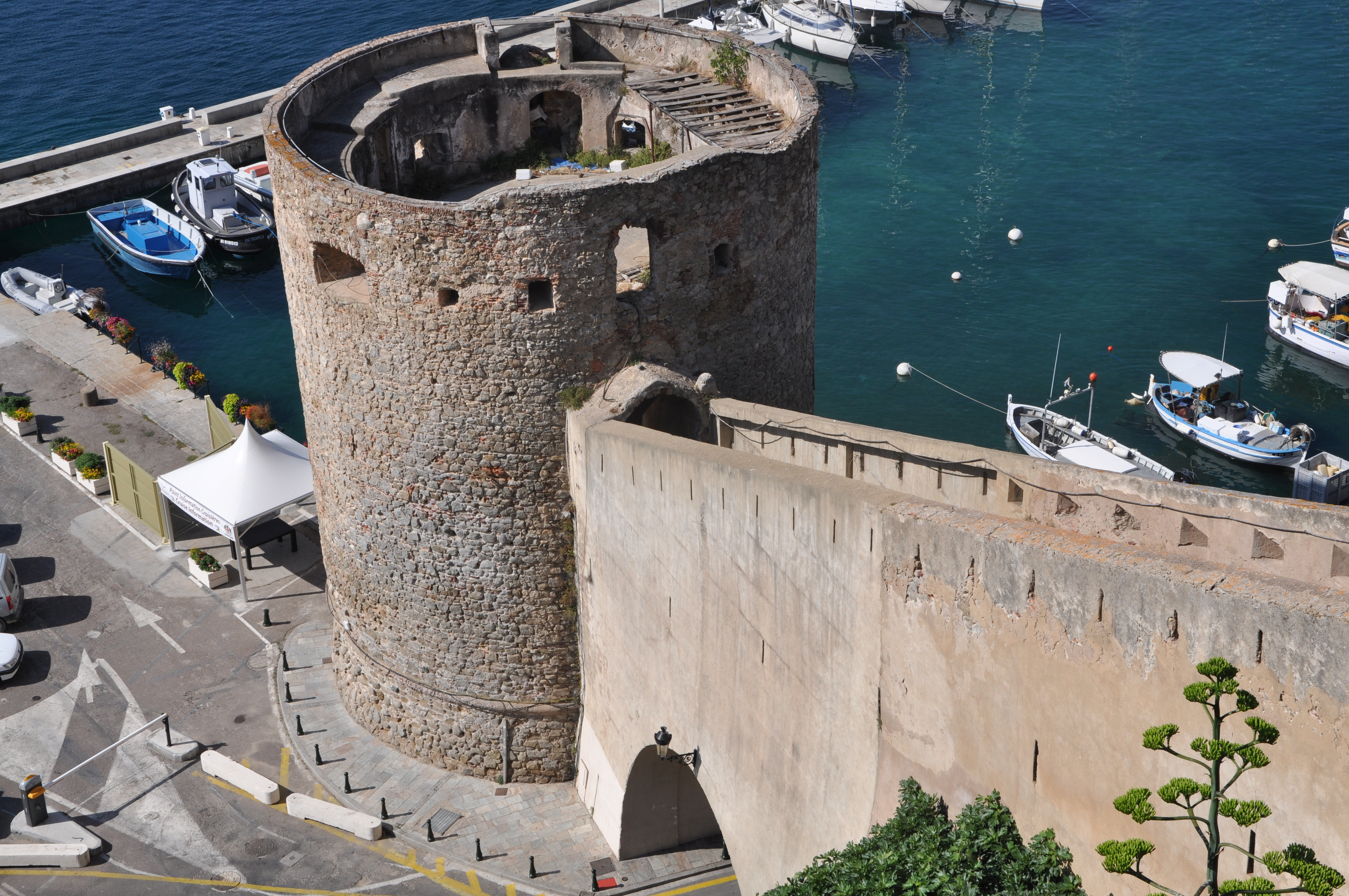

- Location within Corsica
- 42°34′02″N 8°45′35″E

History
- Built: End of 16th century

Monument historique
- Type: Classé
- Designated: 23 August 1990
- Reference no.: PA00099175

The Tower of Calvi (Corsican: Torra di Calvi) is a Genoese tower in the commune of Calvi (Haute-Corse) on the Corsica.

The tower was one of a series of coastal defences built by the Republic of Genoa between 1530 and 1620 to stem the attacks by Barbary pirates.

In 1990 the tower together with the ramparts of the citadel were listed as one of the official historical monuments of France.

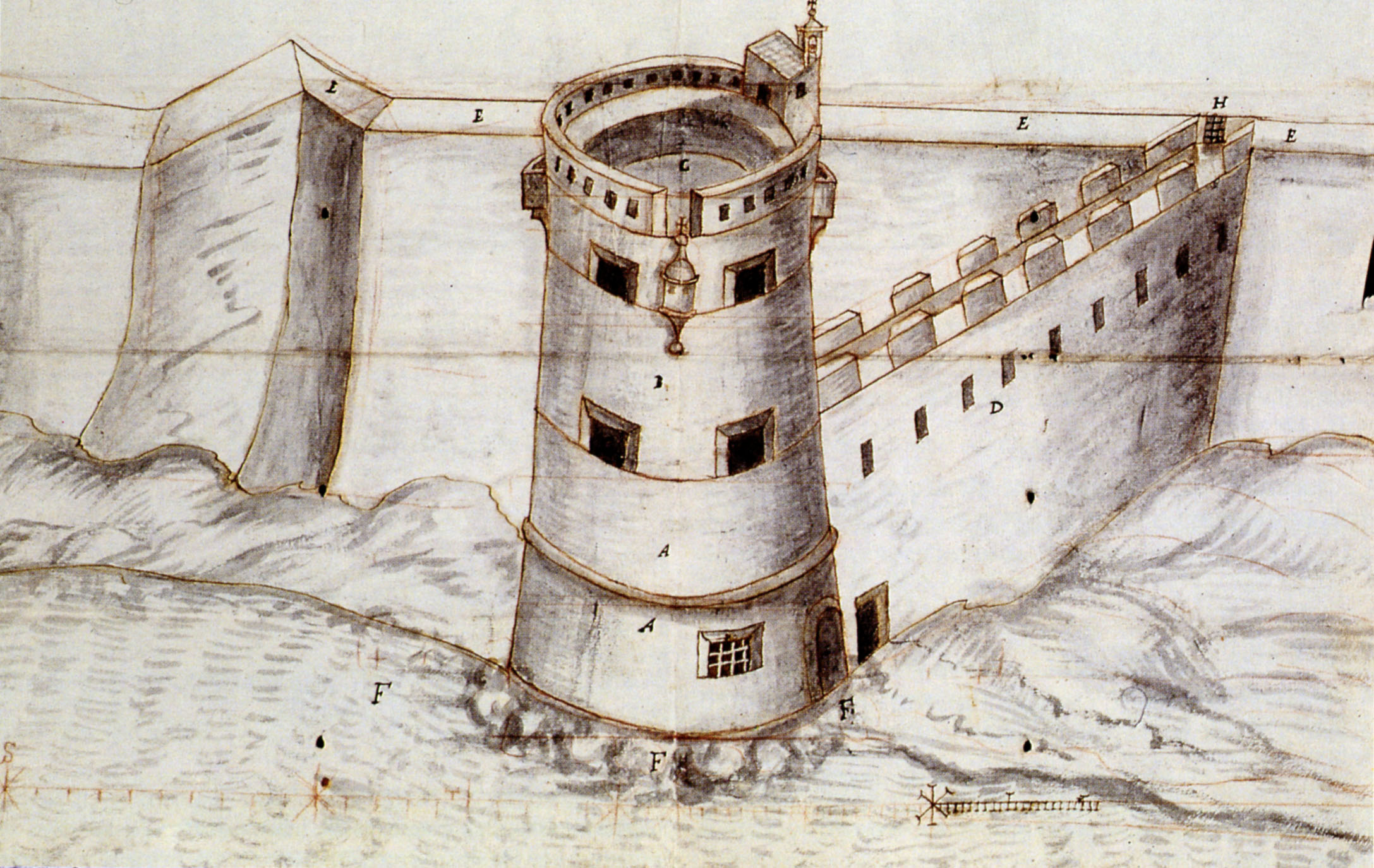
Drawing of the tower from the Genoese archives, 1700.

== See also ==
- List of Genoese towers in Corsica
