= Ernst Bauer =

Ernst Bauer may refer to:

- Ernst Bauer (Kapitän zur See) (1914–1988), German U-boat commander during World War II
- Ernst G. Bauer (born 1928), German-American physicist
