= Ann Bauer =

American novelist and essayist

- Occupation: Novelist
- Writing career
- Genres: Fiction, Novel, Essay
- Notable works: A Wild Ride Up the Cupboards (novel, 2005), The Forever Marriage (novel, 2012)
- Website: www.annbauer.com

Ann Bauer is an American essayist and novelist.

== Life and career ==
Ann Bauer has worked as a writing professor, a food critic, a novelist, a journalist and an advertising copywriter. She has taught at the University of Iowa, Brown University, Roger Williams University, Johns Hopkins University and Macalester College.

While in the Iowa MFA program, Bauer wrote most of her first novel, A Wild Ride Up The Cupboards, which came out with Scribner in 2005. Wild Ride was named a Best Book of 2005 by the Minneapolis Star Tribune and The Providence Journal. Bauer began writing for Salon that same year, eventually becoming a regular contributor. She co-authored her second book, a work of nonfiction billed as a "culinary memoir," with Mitch Omer, the founder of Hell's Kitchen. Damn Good Food was published by Borealis Books in 2009. Her second novel, The Forever Marriage, was published by The Overlook Press in June 2012. Her third novel, Forgiveness 4 You was also published by Overlook in March 2015.

== Works ==
Bauer's essays have appeared in Elle, The Washington Post, The New York Times, Redbook, and The Sun. She has published three novels and a cookbook and culinary memoir (with co-author Mitch Omer).

- A Wild Ride Up The Cupboards (2005)
- Damn Good Food (2009) With Mitch Omer
- The Forever Marriage (June 2012)
- Forgiveness 4 You (March 2015)
