= Benjamin Bauer (politician) =

German politician (born 1989)

Member of the Landtag of Baden-Württemberg
- Incumbent
- Assumed office 11 May 2026
- Constituency: Karlsruhe II

Personal details
- Born: 1989 (age 36–37)
- Party: Alliance 90/The Greens

Benjamin Bauer (born 1989) is a German politician who was elected member of the Landtag of Baden-Württemberg in 2026. From 2019 to 2026, he was a municipal councillor of Karlsruhe.
