= Wolfgang Bauer =

Wolfgang Bauer may refer to:

- Wolfgang Bauer (journalist) (born 1970), reporter for the German magazine FOCUS/Die Zeit, who observed war crimes in Afghanistan
- Wolfgang Bauer (physicist) (born 1959), German-born physicist at Michigan State University
- Wolfgang Bauer (Austrian writer) (1941–2005), Austrian writer and playwright
- Wolfgang Maria Bauer (born 1963), German television actor
