= Calvi, Haute-Corse =

Calvi
- Subprefecture and commune
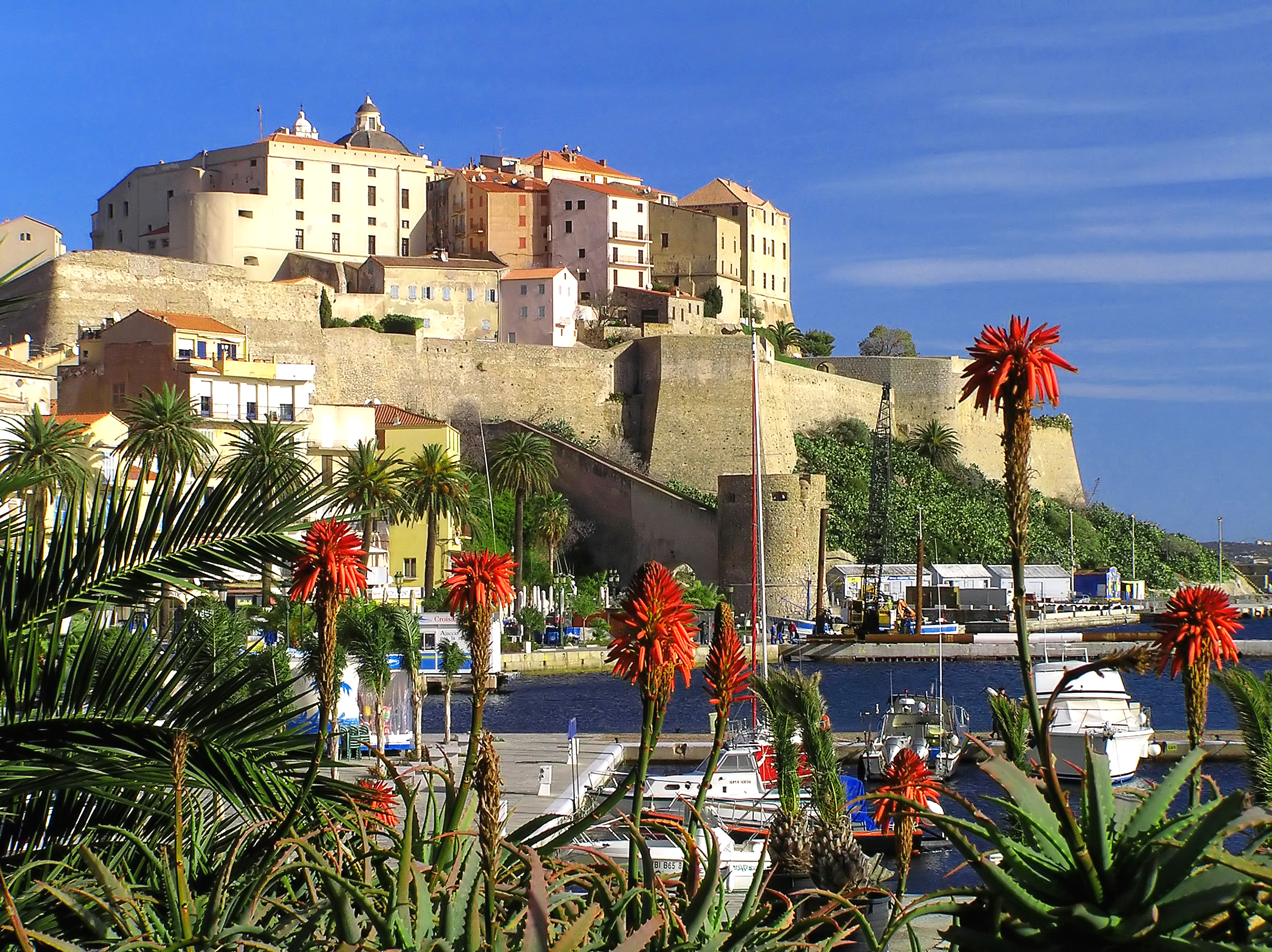
- View of the citadel

- Flag Coat of arms
- Location of Calvi
- Location within France Location within Corsica
- Coordinates: 42°34′07″N 8°45′25″E
- Country: France
- Region: Corsica
- Department: Haute-Corse
- Arrondissement: Calvi
- Canton: Calvi
- Intercommunality: Calvi Balagne

Government
  - Mayor (2020–2026): Ange Santini
- Area^{1}: 31.20 km^{2} (12.05 sq mi)
- Elevation: 81 m (266 ft)
- Highest elevation: 700 m (2,300 ft)
- Lowest elevation: 0 m (0 ft)
- Population (2023): 5,788
  - Density: 185.5/km^{2} (480.5/sq mi)
- Time zone: UTC+01:00 (CET)
  - Summer (DST): UTC+02:00 (CEST)
- INSEE/Postal code: 2B050 /20260
- ^{1} French Land Register data, which excludes lakes, ponds, glaciers > 1 km^{2} (0.386 sq mi or 247 acres) and river estuaries.

Calvi (/ˈkælvi/ KAL-vee, French: [kalvi], Italian: [ˈkalvi], Corsican: [ˈkalvi]) is a commune in the Haute-Corse department of France on the island of Corsica. It is the seat of the Canton of Calvi and of the Arrondissement of Calvi.

According to legend, Christopher Columbus supposedly came from Calvi, which at the time was part of the Genoese Empire. Because the often subversive elements of the island gave its inhabitants a bad reputation, he would have been expected to mask his exact birthplace.

== Geography ==
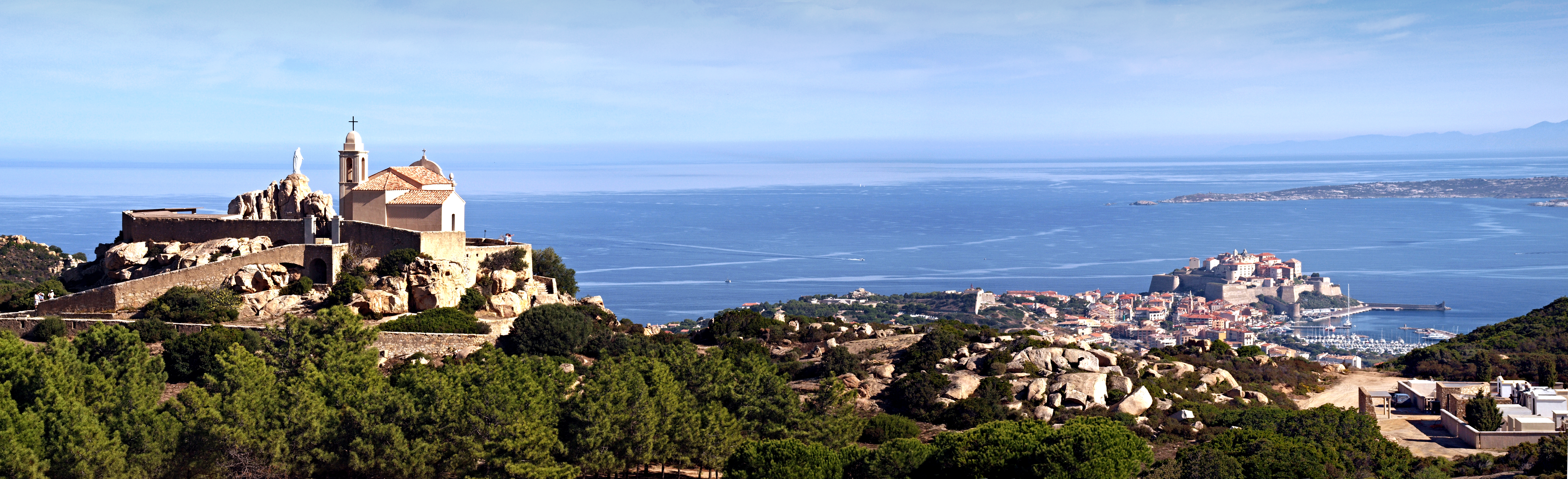
Panorama of Calvi and its Gulf seen from Notre-Dame de La Serra

Calvi is located on the northwest coast of the island of Corsica, 95 km (59 mi) from Bastia and 24 km (15 mi) from L'Île-Rousse. It is the fifth-largest commune in Corsica; however, the arrondissement is the smallest.

=== Climate ===
Calvi has a hot-summer mediterranean climate (Köppen climate classification Csa). The average annual temperature in Calvi is 16.4 °C (61.5 °F). The average annual rainfall is 652.8 mm (25.70 in) with November as the wettest month. The temperatures are highest on average in August, at around 24.7 °C (76.5 °F), and lowest in February, at around 9.4 °C (48.9 °F). The highest temperature ever recorded in Calvi was 42.1 °C (107.8 °F) on 29 July 1983; the coldest temperature ever recorded was −5.6 °C (21.9 °F) on 30 January 1963.

Comparison of local Meteorological data with other cities in France
Town	Sunshine (hours/yr)	Rain (mm/yr)	Snow (days/yr)	Storm (days/yr)	Fog (days/yr)
National average	1,973	770	14	22	40
Calvi	2,713.4	668.3	1.6	25.3	0.5
Paris	1,661	637	12	18	10
Nice	2,724	767	1	29	1
Strasbourg	1,693	665	29	29	56
Brest	1,605	1,211	7	12	75

Climate data for Calvi, Haute-Corse (1991–2020 averages, extremes 1960–present)
Month	Jan	Feb	Mar	Apr	May	Jun	Jul	Aug	Sep	Oct	Nov	Dec	Year
Record high °C (°F)	23.3 (73.9)	23.6 (74.5)	28.8 (83.8)	32.1 (89.8)	36.0 (96.8)	40.0 (104.0)	42.1 (107.8)	40.6 (105.1)	37.4 (99.3)	32.9 (91.2)	29.8 (85.6)	25.4 (77.7)	42.1 (107.8)
Mean daily maximum °C (°F)	14.0 (57.2)	14.2 (57.6)	16.4 (61.5)	19.1 (66.4)	23.1 (73.6)	27.2 (81.0)	30.2 (86.4)	30.2 (86.4)	26.4 (79.5)	22.4 (72.3)	17.8 (64.0)	14.9 (58.8)	21.3 (70.3)
Daily mean °C (°F)	9.5 (49.1)	9.4 (48.9)	11.5 (52.7)	14.0 (57.2)	17.8 (64.0)	21.8 (71.2)	24.6 (76.3)	24.7 (76.5)	21.3 (70.3)	17.7 (63.9)	13.6 (56.5)	10.6 (51.1)	16.4 (61.5)
Mean daily minimum °C (°F)	5.0 (41.0)	4.7 (40.5)	6.6 (43.9)	8.9 (48.0)	12.5 (54.5)	16.4 (61.5)	19.0 (66.2)	19.2 (66.6)	16.2 (61.2)	13.0 (55.4)	9.3 (48.7)	6.2 (43.2)	11.4 (52.5)
Record low °C (°F)	−5.6 (21.9)	−3.9 (25.0)	−4.6 (23.7)	−0.4 (31.3)	3.7 (38.7)	7.5 (45.5)	10.6 (51.1)	12.3 (54.1)	7.9 (46.2)	2.6 (36.7)	−2.3 (27.9)	−4.2 (24.4)	−5.6 (21.9)
Average precipitation mm (inches)	50.3 (1.98)	53.5 (2.11)	58.9 (2.32)	55.8 (2.20)	40.8 (1.61)	32.2 (1.27)	7.6 (0.30)	23.3 (0.92)	59.1 (2.33)	79.2 (3.12)	115.4 (4.54)	76.7 (3.02)	652.8 (25.70)
Average precipitation days (≥ 1.0 mm)	6.1	6.0	6.4	6.7	5.0	2.9	1.0	1.7	5.5	7.1	9.2	7.7	65.4
Average snowy days	0.5	0.6	0.1	0.0	0.0	0.0	0.0	0.0	0.0	0.0	0.1	0.2	1.6
Mean monthly sunshine hours	132.7	150.0	204.6	237.9	296.1	330.9	370.6	331.3	247.0	189.6	131.8	123.3	2,745.6
Source: Meteo France

== History ==
Calvi was founded in the 13th century. Its motto, "Calvi semper fidelis" ("Calvi Always Faithful"), referred originally to its loyalty to the Republic of Genoa, which instated there a closed city centre (préside) in 1278, and built a new castle in 1491 to face new artillery technologies. The motto originates from 1553 when Calvi repulsed two attacks by the French and Turks, aided by Corsican exiles.

In 1555 it was sacked by Dragut Reis and his Barbary pirates.

During the war with Revolutionary France, British forces under Admiral Nelson and Lieutenant-General Charles Stuart captured the city in the Siege of Calvi in 1794. It was during the bombardment of Calvi that Nelson sustained the injury that cost him his eye. The town was retaken by Corsicans the following year.

== Population ==
Historical population

Year	Pop.	±% p.a.
1800	1,162	—
1806	1,083	−1.17%
1821	1,175	+0.55%
1831	1,382	+1.64%
1836	1,457	+1.06%
1841	1,746	+3.69%
1846	1,502	−2.97%
1851	1,837	+4.11%
1856	1,412	−5.13%
1861	2,069	+7.94%
1866	1,884	−1.86%
1872	2,175	+2.42%
1876	1,998	−2.10%
1881	2,023	+0.25%
1886	1,987	−0.36%
1891	2,162	+1.70%
1896	2,132	−0.28%
1901	1,998	−1.29%

Year	Pop.	±% p.a.
1906	2,077	+0.78%
1911	2,269	+1.78%
1921	2,387	+0.51%
1926	2,586	+1.61%
1931	2,827	+1.80%
1936	2,824	−0.02%
1946	2,053	−3.14%
1954	2,035	−0.11%
1962	2,258	+1.31%
1968	2,767	+3.45%
1975	3,530	+3.54%
1982	3,579	+0.20%
1990	4,815	+3.78%
1999	5,177	+0.81%
2007	5,441	+0.62%
2012	5,514	+0.27%
2017	5,559	+0.16%
2023	5,788	+0.68%

Source: EHESS and INSEE (1968-2023)

== Economy ==
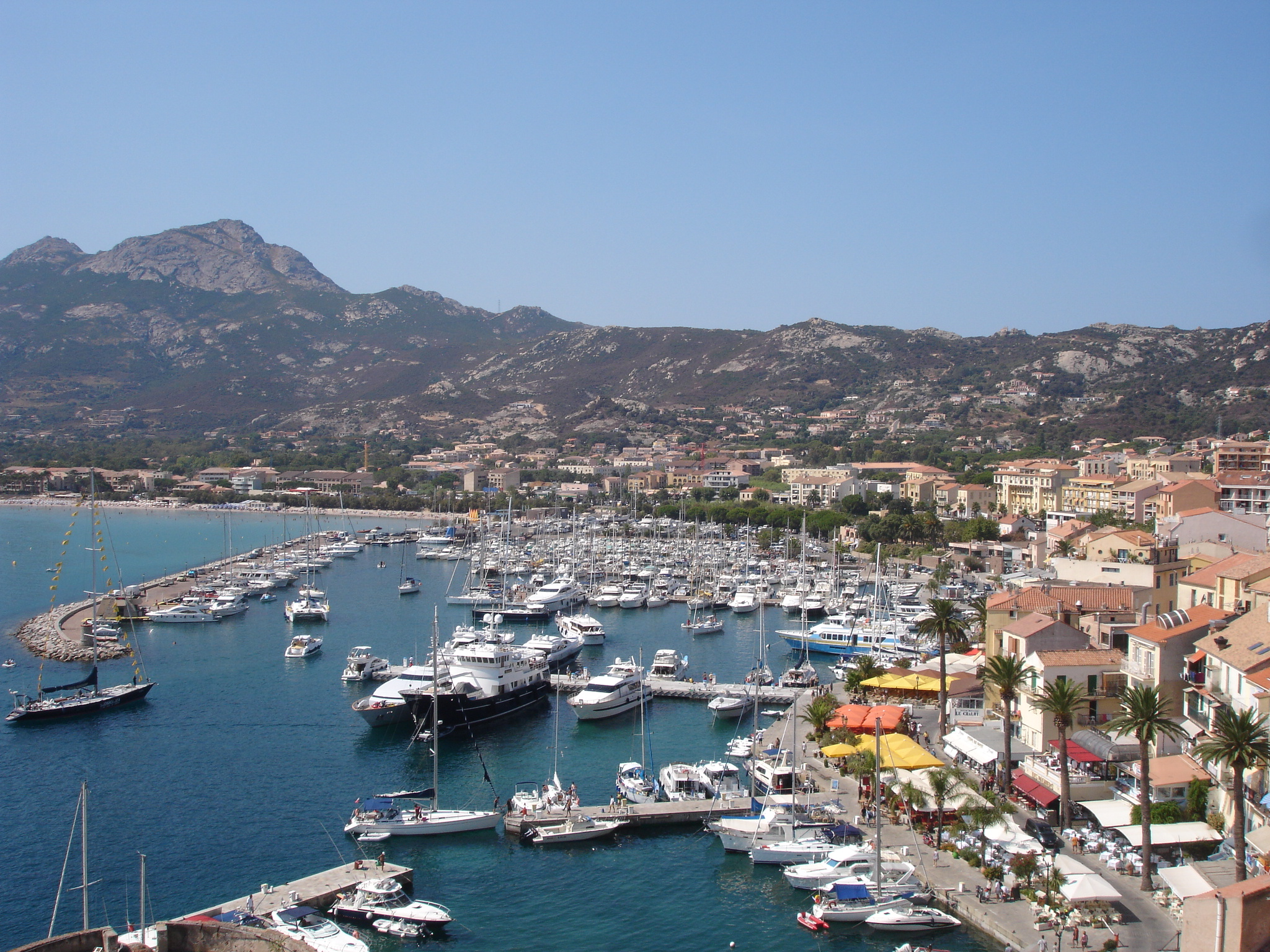
Port of Calvi

The economy of Calvi is essentially based on summer tourism, which started in 1950 due to the pioneering efforts of Vladimir Raitz. Calvi is also home to the French Foreign Legions Second Foreign Parachute Regiment (2 REP), and relies heavily on the sustained business with their base, Camp Raffalli and its inhabitants.

== Transport ==
Calvi is served by the international Calvi - Sainte-Catherine Airport, the Xavier Colonna Port, and a metre-gauge railway line to L'Île-Rousse and Ponte-Leccia, connecting with the main line Ajaccio - Bastia.

== Monuments ==
- Tour du Sel and the citadel
- Église Sainte-Marie de Calvi

== See also ==
- Communes of the Haute-Corse department
- Festival du Vent
- FCA Calvi
