= John Bower (MP for Penryn) =

16th-century English politician

John Bower or Bowyer (fl. 1563) was an English politician.

He was a member (MP) of the parliament of England for Penryn in 1563.
