= Wolfgang =

- Pronunciation: /ˈwʊlfɡæŋ/ French: [vɔlfɡɑ̃ɡ] German: [ˈvɔlfɡaŋ] Polish: [ˈvɔlvɡaŋk]
- Gender: Male
- Language: German

Origin
- Origin: wulf (wolf) + gang (path)
- Meaning: Path of the Wolf
- Region of origin: Central Europe

Wolfgang is a German male given name traditionally popular in Germany, Austria and Switzerland. The name is a combination of the Old High German words wolf, meaning "wolf", and gang, meaning "path", "journey", "travel". Besides the regular "wolf", the first element also occurs in Old High German as the combining form "-olf". The earliest reference of the name being used was in the 8th century. The name was also attested as "Vulfgang" in the Reichenauer Verbrüderungsbuch in the 9th century. The earliest recorded famous bearer of the name was a tenth-century Saint Wolfgang of Regensburg. Due to the lack of conflict with the pagan reference in the name with Catholicism, it is likely a much more ancient name whose meaning had already been lost by the tenth century. Grimm (Teutonic Mythology p. 1093) interpreted the name as that of a hero in front of whom walks the "wolf of victory". A Latin gloss by Arnold of St Emmeram interprets the name as Lupambulus.

== Royalty and nobility ==
- Wolfgang of Regensburg (934–994 AD), Bavarian bishop and Catholic and Orthodox saint
- Wolfgang, Prince of Anhalt-Köthen (1492–1566), German prince of the House of Ascania
- Wolfgang of the Palatinate (1494–1558), German nobleman from the House of Wittelsbach
- Wolfgang, Count Palatine of Zweibrücken (1526–1569), Duke of Zweibrücken
- Wolfgang, Duke of Brunswick-Grubenhagen (1531–1595), Prince of Grubenhagen from 1567 to 1595
- Wolfgang, Count of Hohenlohe-Weikersheim (1546–1610)
- Wolfgang Wilhelm, Count Palatine of Neuburg (1578–1653), Duke of Neuburg, Jülich and Berg
- Prince Wolfgang of Hesse (1896–1989), designated Hereditary Prince of the monarchy of Finland
- Wolfgang von Trips (1928–1961), son of a noble Rhineland family
- Prince Wolfgang of Liechtenstein (b. 1934), Prince from House of Liechtenstein and Count of Reitburg.

== Given name ==
- Wolfgang Amadeus Mozart (1756–1791), Austro-German composer
- Wolfgang Albers (disambiguation), several people
- Wolfgang Ambros (born 1952), Austrian singer-songwriter
- Wolfgang Baldus, German philatelist and writer
- Wolfgang Barthels (born 1940), German footballer
- Wolfgang Bauer (disambiguation), several people
- Wolfgang Becker (director, born 1910) (1910–2005), German film director and film editor
- Wolfgang Becker (director, born 1954) (1954–2024), German film director and screenwriter
- Wolfgang Bernhard (born 1960), former President of Chrysler
- Wolfgang Blankenau (born 1955), Canadian handball player
- Wolfgang Blochwitz (1941–2005), East German footballer
- Wolfgang Bodison (born 1966), American actor
- Wolfgang Böhmer (1936–2025), German politician
- Wolfgang Boettcher (1935–2021), German classical cellist
- Wolfgang Bolyai (1775–1856), Hungarian mathematician
- Wolfgang Borchert (1921–1947), German author and playwright
- Wolfgang Bosbach (born 1952), German politician
- Wolfgang Bosch, mayor of Ljubljana 1520–1524
- Wolfgang Buttress (born 1965), English artist
- Wolfgang Heichel (born 1950), German singer and husband of Henriette Strobel
- Wolfgang Clement (1940–2020), German politician
- Wolfgang Danne (born 1941), West German pair skater
- Wolfgang Dauner (1935–2020), German jazz fusion pianist, composer and keyboardist
- Wolfgang Dietrich (disambiguation), several people
- Wolfgang Dremmler (born 1954), German footballer
- Wolfgang Figulus (c. 1525 – c. 1591), German composer
- Wolfgang Flür (born 1947), German musician, Kraftwerk
- Wolfgang Franz (mathematician) (1905–1996), German mathematician
- Wolfgang Gaede (1878–1945), German physicist and pioneer of vacuum engineering
- Wolfgang Gartner (born 1982), stage name of the American electro house DJ Joseph Youngman
- Wolfgang Hattmannsdorfer (born 1979), Austrian politician
- Wolfgang Helfrich (1932–2025), German physicist
- Wolfgang Herold (born 1961), producer
- Wolfgang Herrndorf (1965–2013), German author, painter, and illustrator
- Wolfgang Jerat (1955–2020), German footballer
- Wolfgang Joop (born 1944), German fashion designer
- Wolfgang Kapp (1858–1922), Prussian civil servant and right-wing nationalist
- Wolfgang Kautek, Austrian physical chemist
- Wolfgang Ketterle (born 1957), German physicist
- Wolfgang Kleff (born 1946), German footballer
- Wolfgang Klytta (2006-2024) Beloved Ragdoll Cat
- Wolfgang Kocevar (born 1969), Austrian politician
- Wolfgang Kuck (born 1967), German volleyball player
- Wolfgang Langewiesche (1907–2002), German aviation expert and author
- Wolfgang Leonhard (1921–2014), German professor and expert on communism
- Wolfgang Lück (born 1957), German mathematician
- Wolfgang Michel-Zaitsu (born 1946), German Japanologist
- Wolfgang Mieder (born 1944), German-American proverb scholar
- Wolfgang Niersbach (born 1950), president of the German Football Association
- Wolfgang Overath (born 1943), German footballer
- Wolfgang Pagenstecher (1880–1953), German heraldist
- Wolfgang Paul (1913–1993), German physicist, recipient of the 1989 Nobel Prize in Physics
- Wolfgang Paul (footballer) (born 1940), German footballer
- Wolfgang Pauli (1900–1958), Austrian-born Swiss-American physicist, recipient of the 1945 Nobel Prize in Physics
- Wolfgang Petersen (1941–2022), German film director
- Wolfgang Petrick (1939–2025), German painter, graphic artist and sculptor
- Wolfgang Petry (born 1951), German singer and songwriter
- Wolfgang Pisa, O.F.M cap (born 1965), Tanzanian Catholic Bishop and President of Tanzania Episcopal Conference
- Wolfgang Preiss (1910–2002), German actor
- Wolfgang Priklopil (1962–2006), Austrian criminal, captor of Natascha Kampusch
- Wolfgang Puck (born 1949), American chef
- Wolfgang Reinhardt (producer) (1908–1979), German film producer and screenwriter
- Wolfgang Reinhardt (athlete) (1943–2011), West German pole vaulter
- Wolfgang Reitherman (1909–1985), German-American Disney animator
- Wolfgang Rihm (1952–2024), German composer
- Wolfgang W.E. Samuel (born 1935), German-born American author and a veteran of the United States Air Force
- Wolfgang Schäuble (1942–2023), German politician (CDU)
- Wolfgang Schmeltzl (c. 1505 – 1564), German writer, composer and priest
- Wolfgang Schmidt (born 1954), German discus thrower
- Wolfgang Schneiderhan (violinist) (1915–2002), Austrian violinist
- Wolfgang Schneiderhan (general) (born 1946), German general
- Wolfgang Steinbichler (born 1989), Austrian para-cyclist
- Wolfgang Stumph (born 1946), German actor
- Wolfgang Thierse (born 1943), German politician
- Wolfgang Tillmans (born 1968), German fine-art photographer and artist
- Wolfgang Uhlmann, chess player
- Wolfgang Van Halen (born 1991), American musician, Van Halen
- Wolfgang von Kempelen (1734–1804), Hungarian author and inventor
- Wolfgang von Leyden (1911–2004), German philosopher
- Wolfgang von Schweinitz (born 1953), German composer and teacher
- Wolfgang von Trips (1928–1961), German racing driver
- Wolfgang Wagner (1919–2010), German opera director
- Wolfgang Wee (born 1982), Norwegian podcast host
- Wolfgang Werlé, German murderer
- Wolfgang Weyrauch (1904–1980), German writer and playwright

== Middle name ==
- Erich Wolfgang Korngold (1897–1957)
- Doyle Wolfgang von Frankenstein (born 1964), formerly of the band Misfits
- Johann Wolfgang von Goethe (1749–1832)

== Art, entertainment, and media ==
- Wolfgang, a short film directed by Anders Thomas Jensen
- Wolfgang Amadeus Phoenix, fourth studio album by French indie pop band Phoenix
- Wolfgang, a character appearing in the American comedy television series The Thundermans
- Wolfgang Bogdanow, a character appearing in the American science fiction drama web television series Sense8
- Wolfgang Krauser von Stroheim, a character from the Fatal Fury series introduced as the final boss of Fatal Fury 2
- Wolfgang (band), Filipino rock band formed in January 1992 in Manila.
