= Filimon =

Filimon can be a masculine given name or a surname. Notable people with the name include:

== Given name ==
- Filimon Abraham (born 1992), German long-distance runner
- Filimon Bodiu, Moldovan activist
- Filimon Gerezgiher (born 2000), German-born football winger
- Filimon Sârbu, Romanian activist
- Filimon Săteanu, Moldovan poet

== Surname ==
- Collins Valentine Filimon (born 1998), Romanian-born badminton player
- Ioannis Filimon, Greek historian, journalist, and publisher
- Mihail Filimon, bishop of the Romanian Orthodox Church
- Nicolae Filimon, Romanian novelist
- Timoleon Filimon, Greek journalist, politician, intellectual, and tutor
