= Cisla (disambiguation) =

Cisla may refer to:

- Cisla, a municipality in the province of Ávila, Spain
- Cisla (Vișeu), a river in Maramureș County, northern Romania
- Cîșla, Cantemir, a commune in Cantemir district, Moldova
- Cîșla, Telenești, a commune in Telenești district, Moldova
