= Bodiu =

Bodiu is a Romanian surname. Notable people with the surname include:

- Andrei Bodiu (1965–2014), Romanian poet, literary commentator, Professor of Literature and publicist
- Filimon Bodiu (died 1950), Moldovan activist and anti-communist
- Olimpiada Bodiu (1912–1971), Moldovan activist and anti-communist
- Victor Bodiu (born 1971), Moldovan politician
