= Catharine van Tussenbroek =

Dutch physician and writer, editor

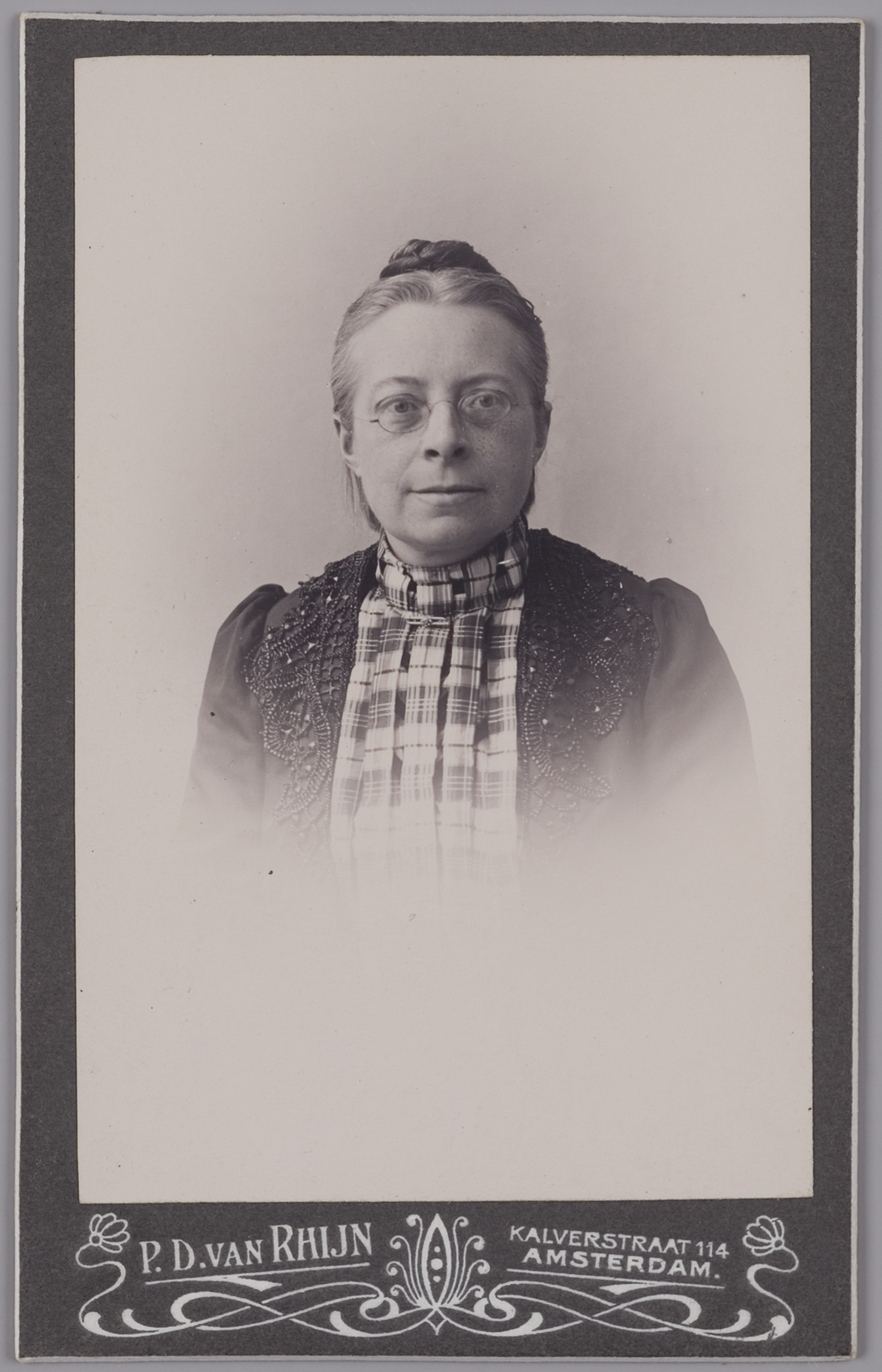
- Van Tussenbroek c. 1890
- Born: Albertina Philippina Catharina van Tussenbroek; 4 August 1852; Utrecht, Kingdom of the Netherlands
- Died: 5 May 1925 (aged 72); Amsterdam, Netherlands
- Occupations: physician, feminist
- Known for: first physician to confirm ovarian pregnancy clinically

Catharine van Tussenbroek (4 August 1852 – 5 May 1925) was a Dutch physician and feminist. She was the second woman to qualify as a physician in the Netherlands and the first physician to confirm evidence of the ovarian type of ectopic pregnancy. A foundation that administers research grants was set up in her name to continue her legacy of empowering women.

== Biography ==
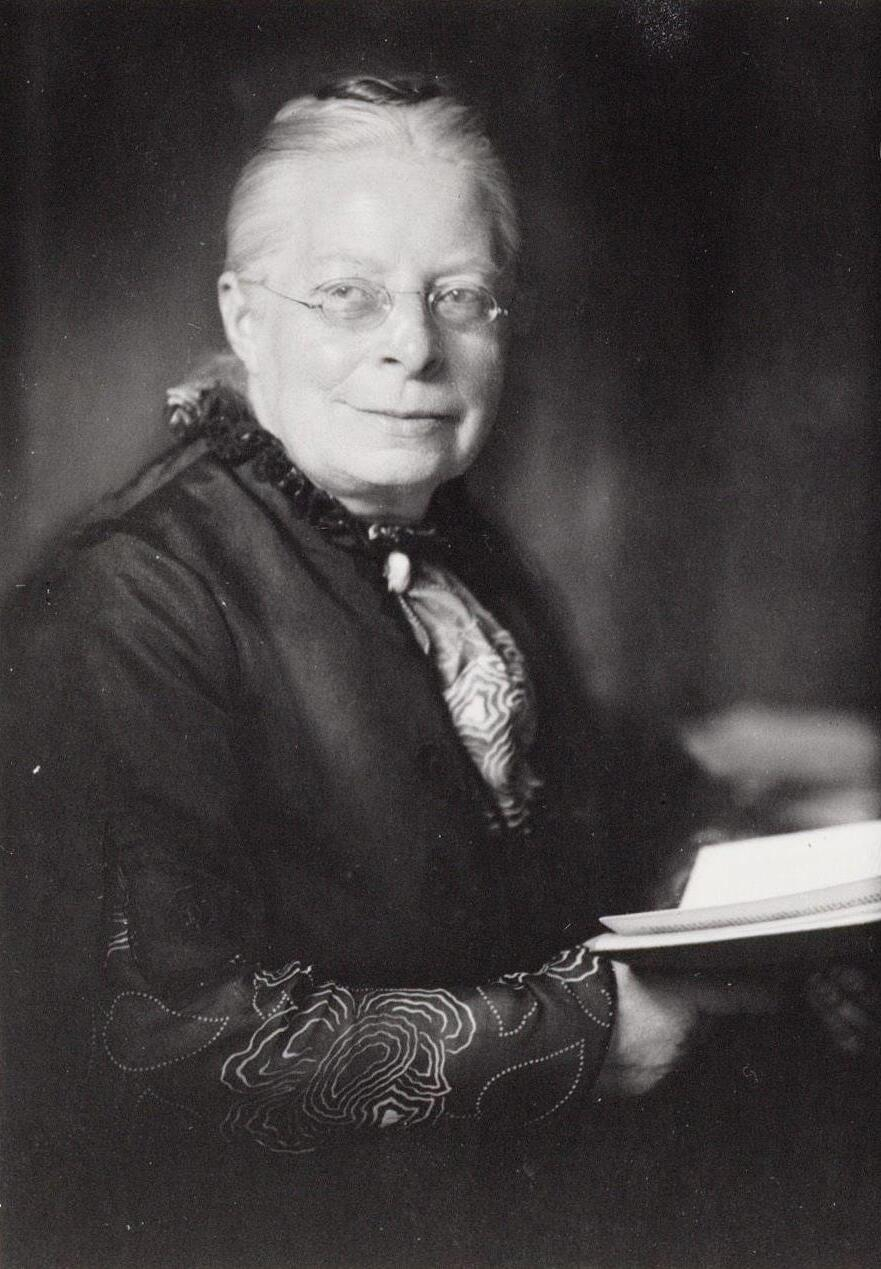
Van Tussenbroek (1922)

Albertina Philippina Catharina van Tussenbroek was born on 4 August 1852 in Utrecht to Cornelia van der Voort and Gerardus van Tussenbroek, a carpenter. Trained as a teacher, van Tussenbroek earned her certificate as an assistant teacher in 1870 and as a head teacher in 1875. She became the first woman to be admitted to Utrecht University when she embarked on her medical studies in 1880, earning her Ph.D. in Medicine in 1887. She moved to Amsterdam upon graduation and began working as a general practitioner focusing on women and children. In February 1898, she became a member of the Dutch Medical Examination Board and shortly afterward was appointed professor of gynecology at Utrecht University. In 1890, she was appointed assistant gynecologist at the Boerhaave Kliniek operated by Dr. Mendes de Leon in Amsterdam. At the time, few women physicians became specialists.

She spent eight years studying and working with de Leon. She became widely recognized and was frequently called for consultations outside the city of Amsterdam. By 1891, she had become secretary of the Dutch Society of Gynecology.

Advocating for women's health and hygiene, van Tussenbroek spoke out against constricting corsets and advocated wearing loose clothing. She pressed for reform of abortion laws and campaigned against needless surgical sterilization of women, claiming that the only beneficiaries were husbands. She presented a paper "The Lack of Life Spirit in Our Young Women and Girls" in 1898 at the opening of the Exhibition of Women's Work held in The Hague, which argued for women's economic independence. She believed that the lack of opportunity available to women and a life with the sole goal of marriage was detrimental to health, calling instead for physical activity and vocational training.

"First and foremost, I believe we women need to have trust and respect in ourselves. I believe that through diligent labour we will achieve economic independence. The conventional image of the woman will then evolve into a new concept. How it will look, I dare not predict. But of one thing I am certain: we women embody the ideal whether we bear the broom, wield the scalpel or stand at the helm of the state."

— Catharine van Tussenbroek speaking on "The Lack of Life Spirit in Our Young Women and Girls" in 1898.

Van Tussenbroek enjoyed research; had the needs of women been less urgent, she would have preferred to continue undertaking microscopic studies rather than gynecology. In 1899, she "demonstrated beyond question" the first accurate clinical and histological description of the existence of the rare condition of ovarian pregnancy. To be a true case of ovarian pregnancy, Otto Spiegelberg had set forth criteria that were required to be present. Van Tussenbroek settled the question of the existence of ovarian pregnancy with her report finding that the ovary and tube on the right side were normal, that sac upon the ovary contained an embryo, that the gestation-sac was connected via a cord, and that the sac had folds of lutein tissue. The medical establishment was skeptical, but three years after her report, her results were confirmed, though skepticism prevailed into the 1920s.

In 1902, she co-authored a study on cervical cancer in the Netherlands. She served as an editor for the Netherlands Journal of Medicine, as well as the Netherlands Journal of Obstetrics and Gynecology. Van Tussenbroek was a board member of the Dutch Society for the Advancement of Medicine. She also was active as a writer, frequently contributing to medical journals. Together with Dr. J. Blok and C. H. de Jong, in 1898 she published "Inleiding tot de studie der schoolhygiëne" (Introduction to the Study of School Hygiene) and in 1911 "De ontwikkeling der aseptische verloskunde in Nederland" (The Development of Aseptic Obstetrics in the Netherlands).

Politically active, van Tussenbroek was a member of the Society for Women's Suffrage and wore a velvet strap pin of the portrait of the American suffragette Carrie Chapman Catt. Between 1910 and 1916, she served as vice-president and later president of the National Association for Female Labor. In 1919, the year that Dutch women were enfranchised, she ran as a candidate for the General Netherlands Women's Organization (Dutch: Algemeene Nederlandsche Vrouwenorganisatie) (ANVO) in the parliamentary elections, although she was defeated.

Van Tussenbroek died on 5 May 1925 in Amsterdam.

== Legacy ==
After van Tussenbroek's death, Dr. Marianne Herwerden, a member of the Dutch Association of Women in Academic Education (Dutch: Vereniging van Vrouwen met een Academische Opleiding) (VVAO), set up a trust fund managed by the association in 1926. The fund, which bears van Tussenbroek's name provides funds for Dutch women scholars to study at home or abroad and complete graduate research.
