= Ovarian pregnancy =

- Specialty: Obstetrics

Ovarian pregnancy refers to an ectopic pregnancy that is located in the ovary. Typically the egg cell is not released or picked up at ovulation, but fertilized within the ovary where the pregnancy implants. Such a pregnancy usually does not proceed past the first four weeks of pregnancy. An untreated ovarian pregnancy causes potentially fatal intra-abdominal bleeding and thus may become a medical emergency.

== Cause and pathology ==
The cause of ovarian pregnancy is unknown, specifically as the usual causative factors – pelvic inflammatory disease and pelvic surgery – implicated in tubal ectopic pregnancy seem to be uninvolved. There appears to be a link to the intrauterine device (IUD), however, it cannot be concluded that this is causative as it could be that IUDs prevent other but not ovarian pregnancies. Some have suggested that patients who undergo IVF therapy are at higher risk for ovarian pregnancy.

An ovarian pregnancy is usually understood to begin when a mature egg cell is not expelled or picked up from its follicle and a sperm enters the follicle and fertilizes the egg, giving rise to an intrafollicular pregnancy. It has also been debated that an egg cell fertilized outside of the ovary could implant on the ovarian surface, perhaps aided by a decidual reaction or endometriosis. Ovarian pregnancies rarely go longer than 4 weeks; nevertheless, there is the possibility that the trophoblast finds further support outside the ovary and thus may affect the tube and other organs. In very rare occasions the pregnancy may find a sufficient foothold outside the ovary to continue as an abdominal pregnancy, and an occasional delivery has been reported.

== Diagnosis ==
The diagnosis is made in asymptomatic pregnant women by obstetric ultrasonography. On pelvic examination a unilateral adnexal mass may be found. Typical symptoms are abdominal pain and, to a lesser degree, vaginal bleeding during pregnancy. Patients may present with hypovolemia or be in circulatory shock because of internal bleeding.

Ideally, ultrasound will show the location of the gestational sac in the ovary, while the uterine cavity is "empty", and if there is internal bleeding, it can be identified. Because of the proximity of the tube, the sonographic distinction between a tubal and an ovarian pregnancy may be difficult. Serial hCG levels generally show not the normal progressive rise. In a series of 12 patients the mean gestation age was 45 days.

Histologically, the diagnosis has been made by Spiegelberg criteria on the surgical specimen of the removed ovary and tube. However, the tube and ovary are not usually removed as sonography allows for earlier diagnosis and surgeons strive to preserve the ovary. Prior to the introduction of Spiegelberg's criteria in 1878, the existence of ovarian pregnancy was in doubt; his criteria helped to identify the ovarian pregnancy from other ectopics:

- The gestational sac is located in the region of the ovary.
- The gestational sac is attached to the uterus by the ovarian ligament.
- Ovarian tissue is histologically proven in the wall of the gestational sac.
- The oviduct on the affected side is intact (this criterion, however, holds not true for a longer ongoing ovarian pregnancy).

An ovarian pregnancy can be mistaken for a tubal pregnancy or a hemorrhagic ovarian cyst or corpus luteum prior to surgery. Sometimes, only the presence of trophoblastic tissue during the histologic examination of material of a bleeding ovarian cyst shows that an ovarian pregnancy was the cause of the bleeding.

== Management ==
Ovarian pregnancies are dangerous and prone to internal bleeding. Thus, when suspected, intervention is called for. Traditionally, an explorative laparotomy was performed, and once the ovarian pregnancy was identified, an oophorectomy or salpingo-oophorectomy was performed, including the removal of the pregnancy. Today, the surgery can often be performed via laparoscopy. The extent of surgery varies according to the amount of tissue destruction that has occurred. Patients with an ovarian pregnancy have a good prognosis for future fertility and therefore conservative surgical management is advocated. Further, in attempts to preserve ovarian tissue, surgery may involve just the removal of the pregnancy with only a part of the ovary. This can be accomplished by an ovarian wedge resection.

Ovarian pregnancies have been successfully treated with methotrexate since it was introduced in the management of ectopic pregnancy in 1988.

An ovarian pregnancy can develop together with a normal intrauterine pregnancy; such a heterotopic pregnancy will call for expert management as not to endanger the intrauterine pregnancy.

== Epidemiology ==
Ovarian pregnancies are rare: the vast majority of ectopic pregnancies occur in the fallopian tube; only about 0.15-3% of ectopics occur in the ovary. The incidence has been reported to be about 1:3,000 to 1:7,000 deliveries.

== History ==
In 1614 Mercier (also shown as Mercerus) described ovarian pregnancy for the first time, as a condition separate from a tubal pregnancy. Once the study of physiology emerged, Boehmer classified extra-uterine pregnancy into three classes: abdominal, ovarian, and tubal. There were many doubters that such a condition existed, particularly Mayer, who wrote an essay not only denying the existence of ovarian pregnancy, but demonstrating that recorded cases to that time were other conditions. Then Cohnstein proposed four criteria that would need to be present for ovarian pregnancy exist. His requirements were: 1) absence of the ovary on the side in which the alleged pregnancy was located; 2) connection of the uterus and sac via an ovarian ligament; 3) cylindrical tissue must line the layers of the sac with direct connection between the tunica albuginea and sac wall; and 4) evidence of the amniotic cavity connection to the ovarian follicle or corpus luteum. These were replaced by Otto Spiegelberg's criteria in 1878, which have been used into the 20th century with additions and modifications.

Up to 1845, about 80 cases of ovarian pregnancy were proposed. With Mayer's 1845 denial that ovarian pregnancy could exist, physicians began taking more care in their descriptions and analysis of cases. Though numerous cases were evaluated, some failed to provide microscopic evidence and others failed to show the necessary histological changes of pregnancy, or failed on one or more of the criteria. In 1899, Catharine van Tussenbroek finally settled the question of the existence of ovarian pregnancy, by providing the first accurate clinical and histological description of a case. Though doubted, her results were confirmed three years later in a case by Thompson.
