= Spiegelberg (disambiguation) =

Spiegelberg is a place in Rems-Murr-Kreis, Baden-Württemberg.

Spiegelberg may also refer to:

- Spiegelberg Stadium, Medford, Oregon, U.S.
- Spiegelberg Brothers, a 19th-century mercantile company in Santa Fe, U.S.
- Spiegelberg criteria, used to identify ovarian ectopic pregnancies
- Spiegelberg, a character in Die Räuber by Friedrich Schiller
- Spiegelberg (Namibia) Mountain in Namibia

== People with the surname ==
- Frederic Spiegelberg (1897–1994), Stanford professor of religion
- Herbert Spiegelberg (1904–1990), American philosopher
- Otto Spiegelberg (1830–1881), German gynecologist
- Patrick Spiegelberg (born 1984), Danish singer
- Wilhelm Spiegelberg (1870–1930), German Egyptologist
