= Lello Voce =

Italian writer

- Born: 1957 (age 68–69); Naples
- Occupations: Novelist, poet, journalist
- Writing career
- Language: Italian
- Genres: Poetry, novel
- Movement: Neoavanguardia

Lello Voce (born in Naples, Italy, in 1957) is an Italian poet, writer, and journalist. He was among the founders of Gruppo 93 and of the six-monthly literary magazine Baldus. He lives and works in Treviso, Veneto.

== Career ==
=== Written work and poetry ===
Voce published Singin’ Napoli cantare in 1982, Musa! in 1995, and I segni i suoni le cose in 1996.

His first novel, Eroina was published in 1999. He wrote all of his second novel, Cucarachas, live online at www.raisatzoom.it, and it was published in 2002 by DeriveApprodi.

His poetry collection, Farfalle da combattimento, was published in 1999 by Bompiani, part of the InVersi series edited by Aldo Nove. The release includes an audio CD with his readings and music by Paolo Fresu and Frank Nemola, and is illustrated with six drawings by Silvio Merlino.

Lai was published in 2007 by edizioni d'if, and his novels were republished by No Reply in the same year, collected under the title Il Cristo elettrico.

L'esercizio della lingua, a selected anthology of his poetry from 1991 to 2008, was published in September 2008 by Le Lettere of Florence, accompanied by an audio/DVD dual disc.

Voce's poems, short stories and essays have been published in newspapers, magazines, and poetry collections in Italy and abroad, and he has taken part in readings and performances at festivals around the world. His work has been translated into French, English, Spanish, Catalan, Japanese, German, Brazilian Portuguese (by Haroldo De Campos) and Arabic (by Joumana Haddad).

=== Other activities ===
In 2000, with Nanni Balestrini, Paolo Fabbri, and Sergio Spina, Voce co-wrote the TV programme The Navel of the World, which broadcast from October of that year. In 2003 he wrote the script for Places/NonPlaces (Sky TV / TV Cult) with Adriana Polveroni.

As a literary critic he has written for a number of publications on post-modernism in literature, the relationship between poetry and vocalization, cooperating with magazines such as Baldus, Allegoria, Testuale, La Taverna di Auerbach, and DeriveApprodi. His essay "Avant-Garde and Tradition" is included in the international collectanea Experimental-Visual-Concrete. Avant-Garde Poetry since the 1960s.

In 2005 he edited and introduced the first Italian anthology of Haroldo de Campos' work, L'educazione dei cinque sensi, with notes by Augusto de Campos and Umberto Eco.

Voce was the artistic coordinator of the International Venezia Poesia Festival in 1996, directed by Nanni Balestrini. In the same year he cooperated with the Italian Culture Institute of Sao Paulo, Brazil to organize the Italian space at the 14th Book Biennial, the most important book fair in South America. He worked for UNESCO as Project Leader and Artistic Director of the international rap and hip-hop culture festival Verona Rap (1998). He was Artistic Director of the 2001, 2002, 2003 and 2004 editions of the Romapoesia International Festival, as well as the first Italian Poetry Festival in Japan in Tokyo in 2001, along with Nanni Balestrini and Luigi Cinque. Since 2005 he has been artistic director of the International Poetry Festival of Monfalcone.

He has been a columnist for the cultural pages of L'Unità, the Giornale di Sardegna, the newspapers of the E-Polis Group, and the monthly magazine Kult.

Along with Giacomo Verde, Voce edited the book Solo Limoni, on the events of the G8 summit in Genoa in 2001, and produced, together with the Radio Sherwood team, Il buio su Piazza Alimonda, a counter-inquiry into Carlo Giuliani's murder. He collaborated with Verde again to produce the net art work QWERTYU for the website of the international architecture magazine Domus.

== Awards and recognition ==
In 2003, Voce was awarded the Delfini Poetry Award for L'esercizio della lingua (with original drawings by Sandro Chia, Mazzoli editore).

The verses of the latter sylloge were set to music by Frank Nemola and published in his first CD, Fast Blood, (MRF5 musical editions, distributed by SELF – in cooperation with musicians Paolo Fresu, Michael Gross, Luigi Cinque and Luca Sanzò.

He was the first to introduce Poetry Slams in Italy and he was the first EmCee to organize and lead an international Poetry Slam with poets of no less than seven different languages (Romapoesia, 2002, Big Torino 2002)

In 2002 the German satellite station DWelle dedicated a special programme to his work.
