= Ernst von Leyden =

German internist (1832–1910)

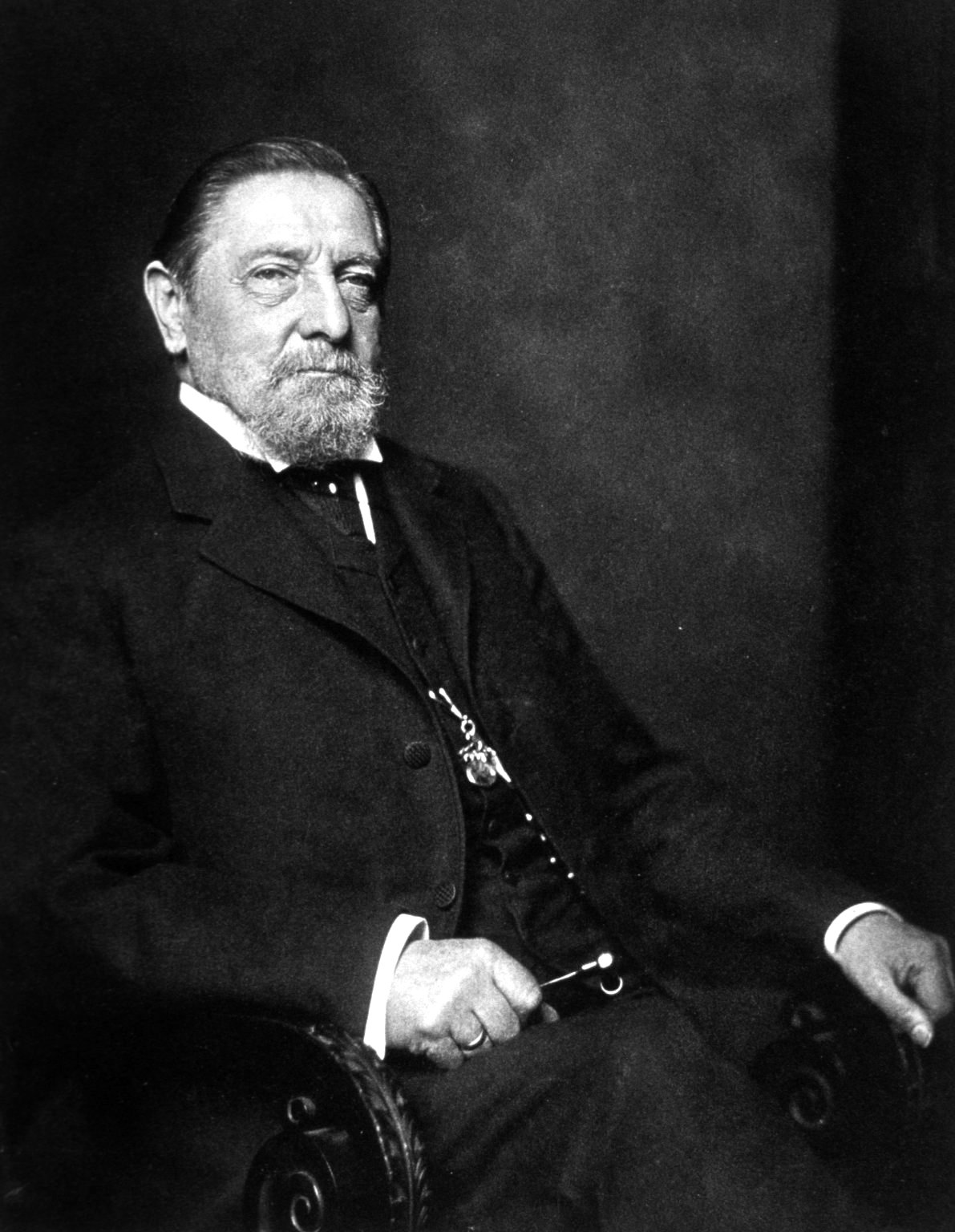
Ernst Viktor von Leyden

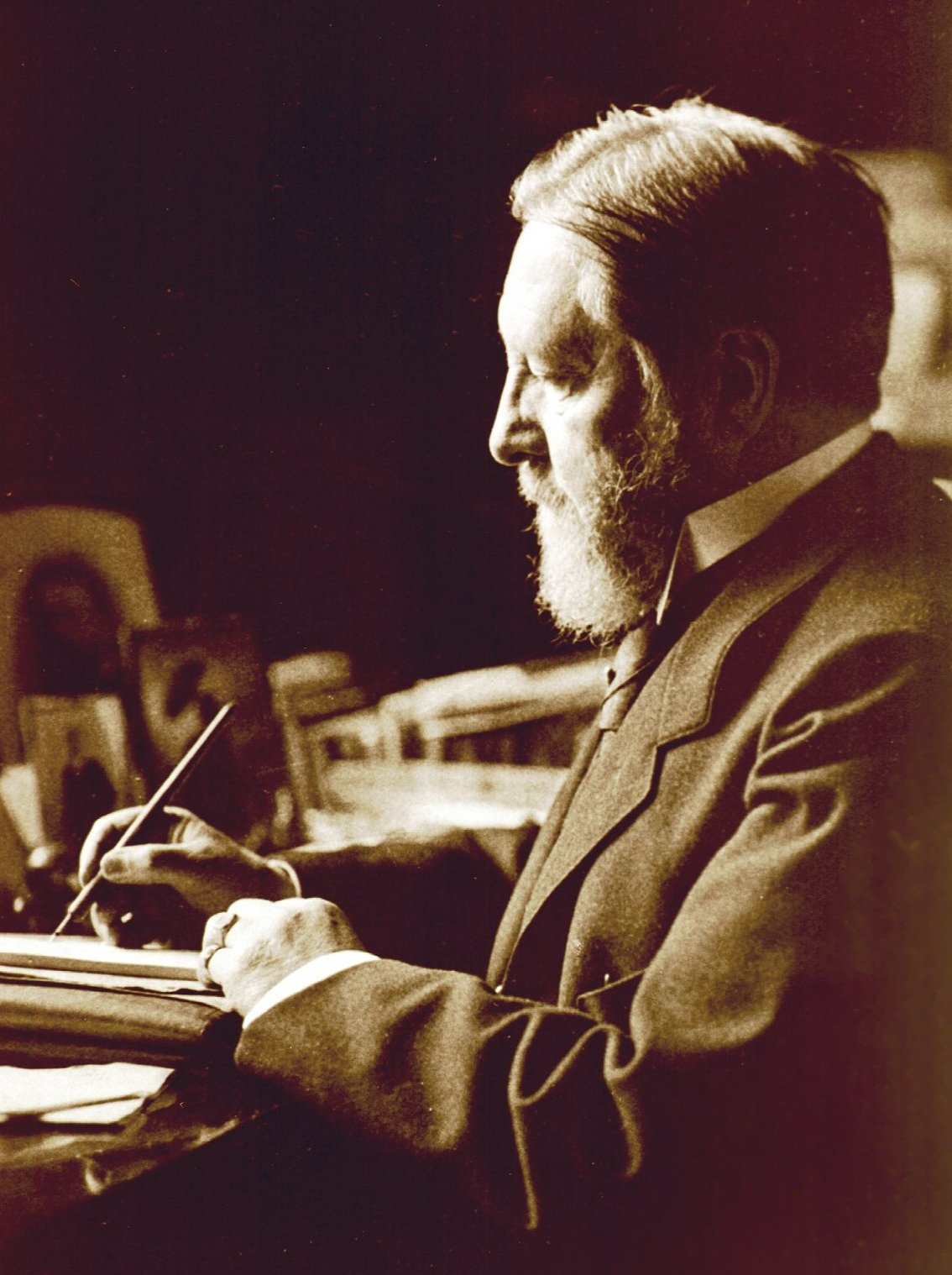
Ernst Viktor von Leyden

Ernst Viktor von Leyden (20 April 1832 – 5 October 1910) was a German internist from Danzig.

== Biography ==
He studied medicine at the Friedrich-Wilhelms-Institut in Berlin, and was a pupil of Johann Lukas Schönlein (1793–1864) and Ludwig Traube (1818–1876). He was later a medical professor at the universities of Königsberg, Strassburg and Berlin. Leyden was an important influence to the career of Ludwig Edinger (1855–1918), and during his tenure at the University of Königsberg worked closely with Otto Spiegelberg (1830–1881) and Friedrich Daniel von Recklinghausen (1833–1910). Among his better known students and assistants were Hermann Nothnagel (1841–1905) at Königsberg and Hermann Ludwig Eichhorst (1849–1921) in Berlin.

In 1880, with Friedrich Theodor von Frerichs, he founded the Zeitschrift für klinische Medizin; in 1881 he founded the Gesellschaft für innere Medizin. He treated Frederick III, German Emperor for his cancer of the larynx, though unsuccessfully, and in the 1890s (from 1894) he was a physician to Tsar Alexander III of Russia. Upon Alexander's death in 1894, Von Leyden was awarded the Order of St. Anna, First Class, with Distinction, by his successor, Tsar Nicholas II.

Von Leyden died in Berlin. The political philosopher Wolfgang von Leyden (1911–2004) was his grandson.

Von Leyden specialized in neurological diseases, and was also a leader in establishing proper hospital facilities for tuberculosis patients. He wrote articles on a wide array of medical topics, including works on tabes dorsalis and poliomyelitis. In 1887–99 he published the two-volume Handbuch der Ernährungstherapie (Textbook of Dietetic Therapy); second edition 1903–04. He also initiated two important events in the early history of oncology: the first international cancer conference, which took place in Heidelberg, Germany, in 1906, and the founding of the first international association for cancer research (the forerunner of today's Union for International Cancer Control) in Berlin in 1908.

== Eponymous medical terms named for Ernst von Leyden ==
- Charcot–Leyden crystals: colorless crystals found in the sputum of asthma patients, or in the faecal matter of amoebic and ulcerative colitis; named along with neurologist Jean-Martin Charcot (1825–1893).
- Leyden's neuritis: A neuritis in which nerve fibres are replaced by fatty tissue.
- Leyden–Möbius syndrome: Pelvic muscular dystrophy; named along with neurologist Paul Julius Möbius (1853–1907).
- Westphal–Leyden ataxia: Acute ataxia that begins in childhood; named along with neurologist Karl Friedrich Otto Westphal (1833–1890).

== Ernst von Leyden medal ==
From time to time, the Ernst von Leyden commemoration medal is awarded for exceptional achievements in the field of internal medicine in Germany
