= Olimpiada =

Olimpiada may refer to:

- Olimpiada (given name)
- Olimpiada mine, a gold mine in Russia
- Olimpiada Neapolis, a volleyball club in Nicosia, Cyprus
- Olimpiada Neapolis FC, a former association football club in Nicosia, Cyprus

== See also ==
- Olympiada (disambiguation)
