= Hermann Eichhorst =

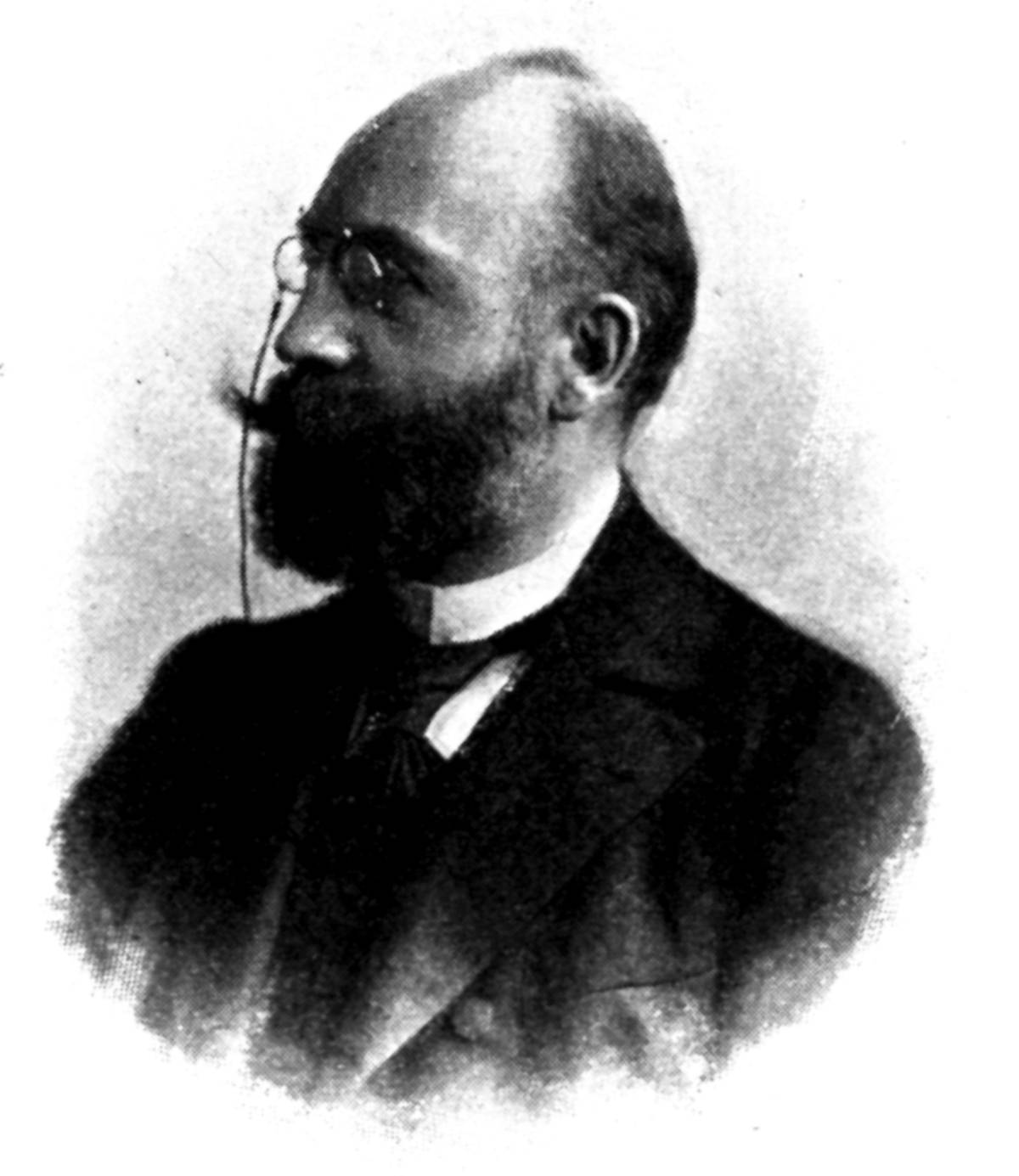
Hermann Eichhorst

Hermann Ludwig Eichhorst (3 March 1849 – 26 July 1921) was a German-Swiss internist

== Biography ==
Eichhorst was born in Königsberg. He studied medicine in Königsberg and Berlin, and was an assistant to Ernst Viktor von Leyden (1832–1910), Bernhard Naunyn (1839–1935), and Friedrich Theodor von Frerichs (1819–1885). In 1884 became director of the medical clinic in Zürich, where he remained for the rest of his career.

Eichhorst made contributions in several fields of medicine. In an 1878 monograph he documented one of the earliest descriptions of progressive pernicious anemia. He also discovered globular forms in the poikilocytosis of this disease, which were to become known as "Eichhorst's corpuscles". In 1896 and 1913 respectively, Eichhorst provided early accounts of infantile and hereditary multiple sclerosis. He also described a form of interstitial neuritis that is sometimes referred to as "Eichhorst's neuritis".

== Selected writings ==
- Die progressive perniciöse Anämie. Leipzig, Veit und Comp, (1878).
- Handbuch der speciellen Pathologie und Therapie für praktische Ärzte und Studirende (Textbook of special pathology and therapy for physicians and students); (1885).
- Pathologie und Therapie der Nervenkrankheiten (Pathology and therapy of nervous diseases).
- Lehrbuch der physikalischen Untersuchungsmethoden innerer Krankheiten. Berlin, 1889; fourth edition, 1896; translated into French and Russian.
- Lehrbuch der practischen Medizin innerer Krankheiten. Vienna, 1899; translated into English, Italian, and Spanish.
- Uber infantile und hereditäre multiple Sklerose (On childhood and hereditary multiple sclerosis)
