= Olympiada =

Olympiada may refer to:

- Olympiada, Chalkidiki, a village in the municipal unit Stagira-Akanthos, Chalkidiki, Greece
- Olympiada, Kozani, a village in the municipal unit Ptolemaida, Kozani regional unit, Greece
- Olympiada, Larissa, a village in Elassona
- Olympiada Patras, a multi-sport club in Patras, Greece
- 1022 Olympiada, an asteroid named after the Olympic Games
- Olympias, mother of Alexander the Great
- "Olympiada", a piece of concert band music composed by Samuel Hazo

== See also ==
- Olimpiada (disambiguation)
