= Olimpiada (given name) =

Olimpiada (Russian: Олимпиада, meaning Olympics) is a Slavic feminine given name. Notable people with the name include:

- Olimpiada Bodiu (1912–1971), Bessarabian anti-Soviet activist
- Olimpiada Ivanova (born 1970), Russian race walker
- Olimpiada Kozlova (1906–1986), Soviet economist
