= Baldus =

Baldus is both a surname and a given name. Notable people with the name include:

- Baldus de Ubaldis (1327–1400), Italian jurist
- Alvin Baldus (1926–2017), American politician
- Edouard Baldus (1813–1889), French photographer
- Marc Baldus, physicist
- Wolfgang Baldus, German philatelist and writer

== Other ==
- Baldus (bug), a genus of bugs in the family Coreidae
