= Olimpiada Bodiu =

- Olimpiada Bodiu and her child
- Born: 1912; Mîndrești, Orhei County, Kingdom of Romania
- Died: 1971 (aged 58–59); Cîșla, Telenești District, Moldavian SSR
- Spouse: Filimon Bodiu
- Children: Ion Bodiu, Iulia Bodiu

Olimpiada Bodiu (1912–1971) was a Bessarabian activist and member of an anti-communist resistance group in the former Moldavian Soviet Socialist Republic.

== Biography ==
Olimpiada (of Olimpia) Bodiu was born in Mîndrești village, then in Orhei County, Kingdom of Romania, now in Telenești District, Moldova. Between 1945–1950, she was a member of an anti-Soviet organization in Bessarabia, led by her husband Filimon Bodiu.

On November 16, 1950 Bodiu, together with her husband and their children, Ion and Iulia, were hiding in Mîndrești, in the house of Porfir Suruceanu, another member of the organization. They were tracked down by MGB troops, with the help of a former contact person from the group. The commander of the MGB unit demanded that they surrender. The Bodius refused, and a hopeless battle ensued. Filimon and Ion died in the shootout, but managed to cover Iulia's escape, whose father ordered her to flee. Olimpiada Bodiu, who fought armed with an automatic pistol, was seriously injured with three bullet wounds, and was arrested by the Soviet security troops.

After spending a few months to heal in an MGB facility, she was taken to Chișinău. Tried by a military tribunal together with other members of the Bodiu resistance group, she was sentenced on 8 June 1951 to 25 years hard labor. In 1954 her sentence was reduced to 15 years of detention, which she spent at the Dubravlag Gulag camp. After her release in 1965, Bodiu settled in Cîșla, Telenești, and died there in 1971.

== Bibliography ==
- Ţurcanu, Ion, Rezistenţa anticomunistă din Basarabia. Grupul Filimon Bodiu, 1946-1950, AT, nr. 2/1995.
- Elena Postică, Rezistenţa antisovietică în Basarabia, 1944-1950, Chişinău, Ed. Ştiinţa, 1997.
- I. Ţurcanu, E. Postică, V.Boldişor, Lupta antisovietică şi anticomunistă a grupării lui Filimon Bodiu, Literatura şi Arta, 1995, 6 iulie.
- Pasat, Valeriu, Trudnâe straniţî istorii Moldovî. 1940-1950 [Documente] (Pages difficiles d'histoire de la Moldavie), Moscova, Ed. Terra, 1994, p. 356
