= Wolfgang Dietrich =

Wolfgang Dietrich may refer to:

- Wolfgang Dietrich (businessman) (born 1948), German businessman
- Wolfgang Dietrich (footballer) (born 1949), Australian rules footballer
- Wolfgang Dietrich (political scientist) (born 1956), Austrian peace researcher and political scientist
