= Wolfgang von Leyden =

German political philosopher

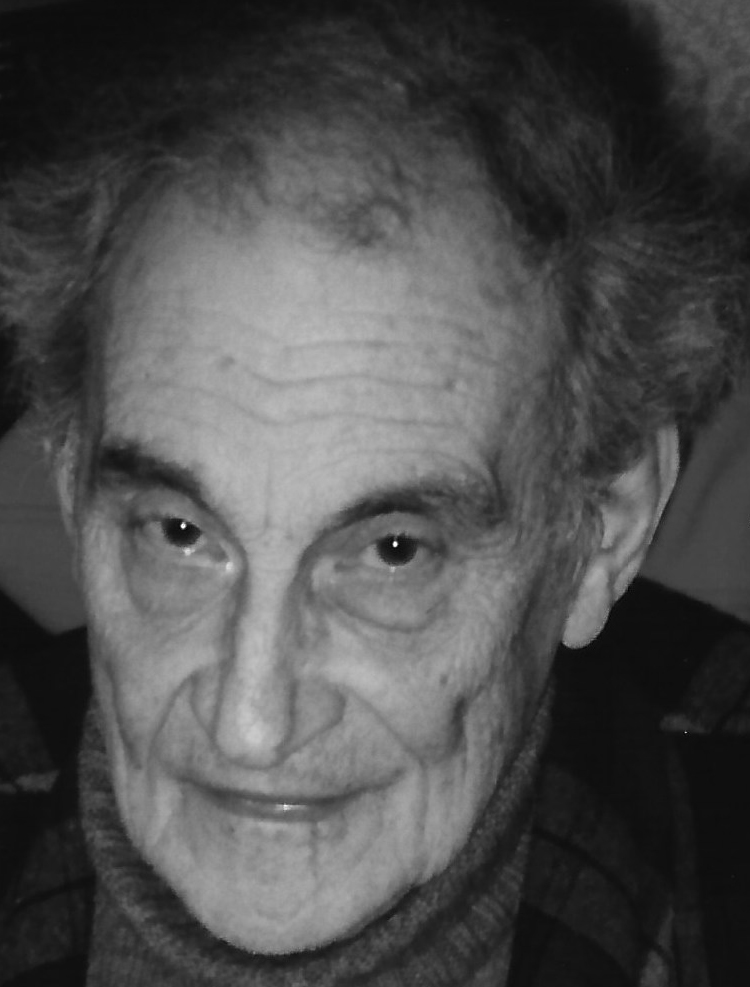
Wolfgang von Leyden

Wolfgang Marius von Leyden (1911-2004) was a German political philosopher who edited the letters of the 17th century empiricist, John Locke.

He was born in Berlin on 28 December 1911, and was a grandson of Ernst Viktor von Leyden. He received a broad humanistic education, studying at German (Berlin, Göttingen) and Italian (Florence) universities. When in Italy, in 1939, he found himself stateless, possibly because of his Jewish descent, or possibly because of being confused with his brother, who was an alleged member of the communist party in Germany. Just before the second World War broke out he managed, assisted by an Englishman he met in Florence, to come to England, where he was, as a German national and an Italian resident, interned, first in Warth Mill in Lancashire and later on the Isle of Man, like most citizens of the Axis powers that came to the UK.

Throughout his career he studied the concepts of memory (Fernández 2006) and identity (McClure, 1996). From 1946 to 1977 he lectured at Durham University. After retiring he continued part-time at the London School of Economics. At LSE Wolfgang's seminars on Ancient Greek thought were so popular that many of the attendees were not even officially taking the course, such was his standing. He died on 4 September 2004, kind and modest to the last.

== Publications ==
- Leyden, W. von. 1968. Seventeenth-century metaphysics; an examination of some main concepts and theories. New York: Barnes & Noble.
- Locke, John (1954). W. von Leyden (ed.). Essays on the law of nature: The Latin text, with a translation, introduction and notes, together with transcripts of Locke's shorthand in his journal for 1676. Oxford, England: Clarendon Press – via Internet Archive.
