= Mihail Filimon =

Romanian Orthodox bishop

His Grace Mihail of Australia and New Zealand
- Native name: Mihail Filimon
- Church: Romanian Orthodox Church
- Diocese: Romanian Orthodox Episcopate of Australia and New Zealand
- Elected: March 5, 2008
- Installed: April 20, 2008

Personal details
- Born: Mihail Maricel Filimon Matca
- Denomination: Eastern Orthodox Christianity

Mihail Filimon is a bishop of the Romanian Orthodox Church. He is the primate of the Romanian Orthodox Episcopate of Australia and New Zealand.

== Early life ==
Mihail Maricel Filimon was born on January 25, 1964, in the village of Matca, located in eastern Romania. After completing basic education, Maricel entered the Cernica monastery of the Archdiocese of Bucharest. With the approval of Patriarch Iustin of Romania, Maricel was tonsured a monk, and subsequently named Mihail.

In the summer of 1986, Mihail was transferred to another monastery in Curtea de Argeș. There, he fulfilled the duties of hall custodian and cashier. The next year, Mihail was accepted into the University Theological Institute of Sibiu, graduating in 1991 with a bachelor's degree.

At university, he was ordained by Bishop Calinic Argatu of Argeș and Muscel as a hierodeacon, on April 18, 1987. Mihail was later ordained a hieromonk by Bishop Calinic on September 11, 1988. With the blessing of Bishop Calinic, Mihail was made protosyngellos on November 8, 1991. That same year, he was admitted into doctorate Theology courses, under the guidance of his professor, Dr. Ioan Ica.

In the 1991-1992 academic year, Mihail was appointed professor of the Old and New Testaments at the theological seminary in Turnu Măgurele. In 1992, he was recommended to the Holy Synod of the Church of Greece to receive a postgraduate scholarship. The following year, Mihail attended Greek language courses at the Faculty of Philology of the Aristotle University of Thessaloniki. Through this, he requested to be enrolled among the candidates for the title of Doctor of Theology following the approval of his application in 1993. At this time, he began developing his thesis: "The Catechetical Ministry of the Orthodox Catholic Church of Romania in the 20th Century."

== Career ==
In the working session of the Holy Synod of the Romanian Orthodox Church on December 8-9, 1994, Mihail was granted the rank of archimandrite - to which he was elevated on January 22, 1995. After returning from Thessaloniki; on October 1, 1999, he was appointed lecturer of Christian Pedagogy at the University of Pitești. Later, on April 23, 2003, Archimandrite Mihail entered the Romanian Orthodox Monastery of the Ascension of the Lord in Detroit, Michigan. On July 27 of that year, the monastery community elected Archimandrite Mihail as abbot, later confirmed by Archbishop Nathaniel of Detroit, of the Romanian Orthodox Episcopate of America.

At the request of Patriarch Daniel of Romania, Archimandrite Mihail returned to Bucharest, being appointed as administrative vicar of the Archdiocese of Bucharest.

=== Episcopate of Australia and New Zealand ===
The Romanian Orthodox Episcopate of Australia and New Zealand was established at the initiative of Patriarch Daniel of Romania, for the Romanian diaspora community of Australia who built parishes after migrating in the 1970's.

On March 5, 2008, together with the official founding of the Episcopate, Archimandrite Mihail was elected by the Holy Synod of the Church of Romania to the episcopal see of the Romanian Orthodox Episcopate of Australia and New Zealand. Archimandrite Mihail Filimon was consecrated to the episcopate on the feast of Palm Sunday, April 20, 2008, in the Patriarchal Cathedral in Bucharest. On the patronal feast of the Saints Peter and Paul Romanian Orthodox Cathedral in Melbourne, Australia - June 29, 2008, Bishop Mihail Filimon was enthroned, following the Divine Liturgy service. During the enthronement ceremony, which was officiated by a delegation of high-ranking hierarchs, a Patriarchal letter was read.
