= Filimon Bodiu =

- Born: 1910; Mîndrești, Orhei County
- Died: November 16, 1950 (aged 39–40); Moldavian SSR, Soviet Union
- Cause of death: Gunshot wounds
- Other name: Dimitrie Grosu
- Spouse: Olimpiada Bodiu
- Parent(s): Eftim and Axinaia

Filimon Bodiu (1910 - November 16, 1950) was a Moldovan activist in the former Moldavian Soviet Socialist Republic.

== Biography ==
Filimon Bodiu was born in Mîndrești. Between 1945 and 1950, he was the leader of an anti-Soviet group in Bessarabia, killing several representatives of the Soviet authorities. On November 16, 1950, after refusing to surrender, Bodiu was killed during a gun fight with the authorities. His son was also killed in the shootout, while his wife, Olimpiada Bodiu, was taken as prisoner.

== The leader of the anti-Soviet resistance group ==
Although Filimon Bodiu's group was composed of only 8–10 people, the social network was quite large. According to the archives over 50 families have sheltered and supported him, and were described as "terrorist" by the Stalinist security organs. At first, this group was aimed at propaganda only, but later engaged in robbery and murder against those believed to support the Soviet authorities.

Bodiu organized "meetings with the peasants" at homes of some of the participants, where he spoke of the danger of Sovietisation and forced collectivization. The authorities considered these actions as "criminal terror". Another "terrorist" method according to the authorities were intimidation letters addressed to the officials. By these letters, in authoritarian language, Bodiu requested not to "rob" the peasants anymore and to respect their religious feelings. The group fighting methods became aggressive when the prosecution bodies had tried to arrest Filimon Bodiu. During its activity, the group committed several murders.

== Death ==
On November 16, 1950, Filimon, Olimpiada, Ion, and Iulia Bodiu were hiding in Mîndrești village in the house of Porfir Suruceanu, the member of the organization. They were tracked down by the Ministry of State Security with the help of a former contact person of the group. The commander of the MSS unit demanded to capitulate. Bodiu refused and engaged instead in a hopeless battle. Filimon and Ion died in a shootout, but managed to cover Iulia's escape, whose father ordered her to flee. Olimpiada was seriously injured and arrested.

== Bibliography ==
- Țurcanu, Ion, Rezistența anticomunistă din Basarabia. Grupul Filimon Bodiu, 1946–1950, AT, nr. 2/1995.
- Elena Postică, Rezistența antisovietică în Basarabia, 1944–1950, Chișinău, Ed. Știința, 1997.
- I. Țurcanu, E. Postică, V. Boldișor, Lupta antisovietică și anticomunistă a grupării lui Filimon Bodiu, Literatura şi Arta, 1995, 6 iulie.
- Pasat, Valeriu, Trudnâe stranițî istorii Moldovî. 1940–1950 [Documente] (Pages difficiles d'histoire de la Moldavie), Moscova, Ed. Terra, 1994, p. 356
