= Ioannis Filimon =

19th century Greek historian and publisher

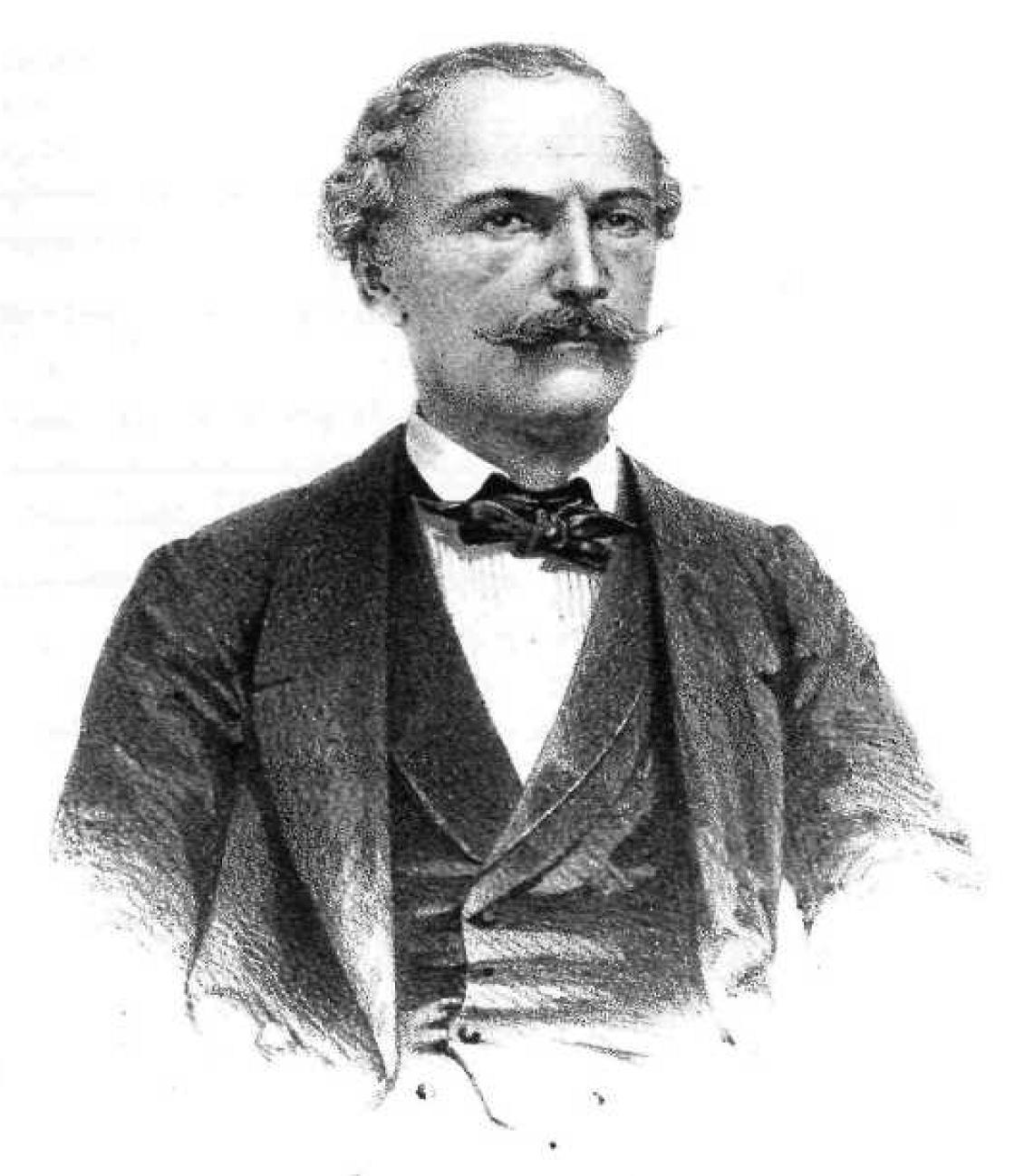
- Born: 1798; Constantinople, Ottoman Empire (now Istanbul, Turkey)
- Died: 13 January 1874 (aged 75–76); Athens, Kingdom of Greece
- Citizenship: Greece
- Education: Great School of the Nation
- Known for: historian, Member of the Hellenic Parliament (1868–1869, 1875–1881)
- Children: Timoleon Filimon

Ioannis Filimon (Greek: Ιωάννης Φιλήμων; 1798/99–1874) was a 19th-century Greek historian, militant journalist, and publisher of the newspaper Aion for more than fifteen years, from 1838 to 1854. He also participated actively in the Greek Revolution of 1821.

His work entitled "Essay on the history of Filiki Eteria" was first published in 1834, a fact that makes Filimon one of the first historians of modern Greece. Filimon, intending to write the first general history of the Greek Revolution, tried to unfold the history of the Filiki Eteria, a secret revolutionary organization, in order to emphasize its leading role in the conception and dissemination of the idea of freedom and to restore its forgotten connection with the Revolution. Although he managed to gather several sources, Filimon stated that they were not enough to write a true story of Filiki Eteria. Nonetheless, the essay has been an important source of information for subsequent memoirists and historians of the Greek Revolution.

== Biography ==
Ioannis Filimon was born in Constantinople in 1798 or 1799. His father came from Thrace or Cyprus and was a painter in Constantinople. Ioannis Filimon studied at the Great School of the Nation and learned typography while working at the Patriarchal Printing Office typesetting the first volume of the Ark of the Greek Language. At that time, he also learned the Turkish language.

According to a tradition, Filimon, being a refugee child himself, found shelter in the house of the Ypsilantis family in Constantinople. With the family's help, young Filimon acquired a high education.

== Actions in Revolutionary Greece ==
In October 1821, when he arrived in the Peloponnese from Constantinople, Filimon served as the secretary of Dimitrios Ypsilantis, with whose family he had been connected for a long time. While he was in the service of Ypsilantis, he witnessed the failed siege of Nafplio (December 4, 1821) and the surrender of Acrocorinth by the Turks on January 14, 1822. He fell ill with typhus and was unable to accompany Ypsilantis in his campaign to Eastern Greece in 1822.

After recovering, Filimon was hired as a secretary of the Executive Authority by Theodoros Negris and copied the first Constitution of Greece which had been voted by the First National Assembly. Two months later, he went to Fthiotida to meet with Ypsilantis; they then returned together to Tripoli, where Ypsilantis took over as President of the Parliament. During Dramali's invasion in Peloponnese (July 5, 1822), he provided Kolokotronis with accurate information about the forces of the enemy's vanguard and about the fortress of Argos Larissa, which was empty and so Kolokotronis could occupy it. From July 16–19, 1822, his life was in danger during the battles against Dramali.

He worked as a secretary in the government of Georgios Kountouriotis and in the spring of 1825 as a secretary of Petrobey Mavromichalis. He returned to the service of Dimitrios Ypsilantis as the secretary of his staff until 1829.

== Kapodistrian period ==
In 1831, unrest against governor of the Greek State, Ioannis Kapodistrias, affected Filimon as well. Initially, he declared that he did not wish to be involved; up until the beginning of 1831, he had maintained good relations with the Mavromichalis family, Kapodistrias' foes. Kanellos Deligiannis wrote that at first Filimon was willing to collaborate with Petrobey Mavromichalis for the best organization of the opposition against the Ottomans in Mani. According to Deligiannis, Filimon eventually backed down and betrayed Mavromichalis, by refusing to publish an anti-government newspaper. According to Filimon himself, he had joined the pro-government camp and had also submitted a report to the Governor regarding the deteriorating internal political situation, alongside suggestions on how to overcome it.

However, Filimon's real target was Kapodistria's opposition and he wished to attack them by way of publishing a pro-government newspaper. Filimon agreed with Kapodistrias that in order for the parliamentary regime to function properly, Greece's landless citizens should receive land by the government. However, there were obstacles that delayed this development; more specifically, the border demarcation of the new state had to be preceded so that these estates could be distributed to the landless, after the assessment of the demographic situation. Moreover, the accusations made against Kapodistrias' government had to be refuted immediately, which is why Filimon decided to suggest to Augustine Kapodistrias the publication of a pro-Kapodistrias newspaper entitled The Eirinikos, at the end of March and the beginning of April 1831.

== Death ==
Filimon had hemiplegia since 1870, and died in Athens on January 1, 1874. He was buried the next day and was awarded the honors of a Major of the Royal Phalanx.

== Writings ==
- Ioannis Filimon, "Essay on the history of Filiki Eteria (Society of Friends)", Nafplio, 1834.
- Ioannis Filimon, "Essay on the history of Filiki Eteria". Institution of the Greek Parliament about the parliamentary system and democracy. Athens, 2021.
- Ioannis Filimon (1859–1860), "Historical essay on the Greek Revolution", 3 volumes (information about the publishing of the volumes varies)
- Ioannis Filimon (1861), "Historical essay on the Greek Revolution", volume 4.
- Ioannis Filimon, Short biography of N. Spyliadis by Ioannis Filimon Nafplio, 1868, published by K Ioannidis

In the first volume of "Historical essay on the Greek Revolution", Filimon deals again with the subject of Filiki Eteria; since his original essay, he managed to identify an unclassified part of the central Archive of Filiki Eteria through investigations and his confidential relationship with Dimitrios Ypsilantis. In this volume, Filimon does not hesitate to admit his mistake regarding the derogatory judgments he made about Emmanuel Xanthos in his first work, where he accused him of wasting Filiki Eteria's money and being responsible for Skoufas's death. After reading the apology from Xanthos, he upheld the truth with an article in the newspaper Aion (March 19, 1839).

Ioannis Filimon was one of the first historians to collect and publish Ottoman documents, explicitly recognizing the importance of Turkish archives for writing the history of the Greek Revolution.

== Bibliography ==
- Aggelomati-Tsougkaraki, Eleni (2003). "Historical sources of the Struggle. Documents, memoirs, first stories ". History of Modern Hellenism 1770–2000. 3rd volume, The Greek Revolution, 1821–1832. Athens: Ελληνικά γράμματα. pp. 371–387.
- Despotopoulos, Alexandros (1967). Ioannis Filimon. Fighter, journalist, historian. Athens.
- Despoina Themeli-Katifori (1972), "Ενέργειες του Ιωάννου Φιλήμονος για την έκδοση φιλοκαποδιστριακής εφημερίδος" "Actions of Ioannis Filimon for the publication of a pro-Kapodistrian newspaper" Mnimon (Society for the Study of Modern Hellenism) 2: 273–296.
- Kostas Lappas,Δοκίμιον ιστορικόν περί της Φιλικής Εταιρίας, Ίδρυμα της Βουλής των Ελλήνων για τον Κοινοβουλευτισμό και τη Δημοκρατία, Athens 2021
