= Wolfgang Albers =

Wolfgang Albers may refer to:

- Wolfgang Albers (politician) (born 1950), Die Linke politician in Berlin
- Wolfgang Albers (police president) (born 1955), former police chief of Cologne
