= Cisla =

- municipality
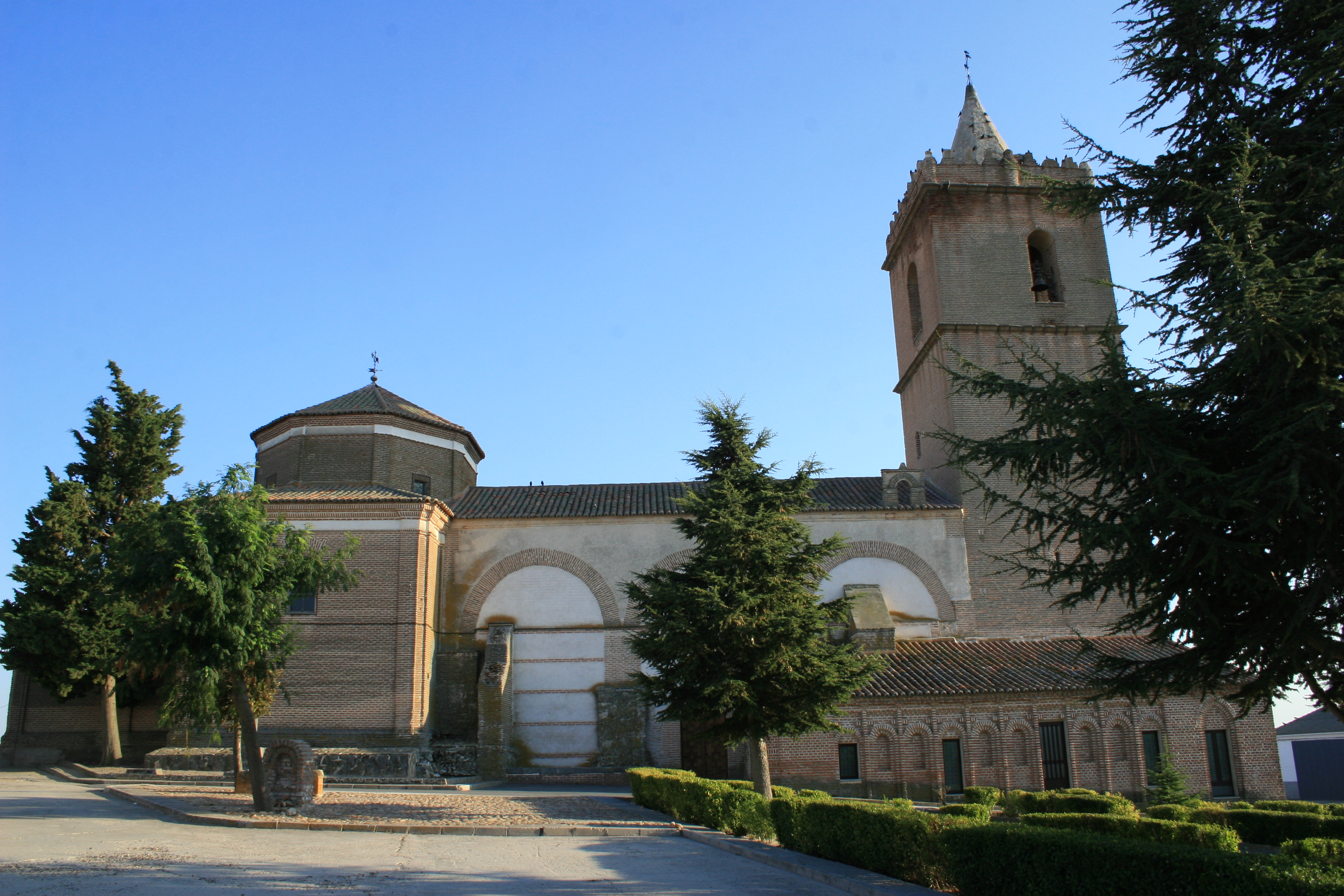
- Cisla Church

- Location in Spain. Cisla (Spain)
- Coordinates: 40°57′53″N 5°00′44″W
- Country: Spain
- Autonomous community: Castile and León
- Province: Ávila
- Municipality: Cisla

Area
  - Total: 20.31 km^{2} (7.84 sq mi)
- Elevation: 853 m (2,799 ft)

Population (2025-01-01)
  - Total: 107
  - Density: 5.27/km^{2} (13.6/sq mi)
- Time zone: UTC+1 (CET)
  - Summer (DST): UTC+2 (CEST)
- Website: Official website

Cisla is a municipality located in the province of Ávila, Castile and León, Spain.

== Population ==
Historical population
Year	Pop.	±% p.a.
2023	99	—
2024	102	+3.03%
2025	107	+4.90%
Source: INE
