= Wolfgang Kautek =

Austrian scientist and chemist

- Born: 11 April 1953 (age 73)
- Education: Vienna University of Technology; University of Technology Berlin
- Scientific career
- Fields: Chemist
- Workplaces: University of Vienna

Wolfgang Kautek is an Austrian physical chemist and the head of the Physical chemistry department at the University of Vienna.

He is the President of the Erwin Schrödinger Society for Nanosciences (ESG) and the Chairman of the Research Group "Physical Chemistry" at the Austrian Chemical Society (GÖCh).
