= Timoleon Filimon =

Greek journalist and scholar (1833–1898)

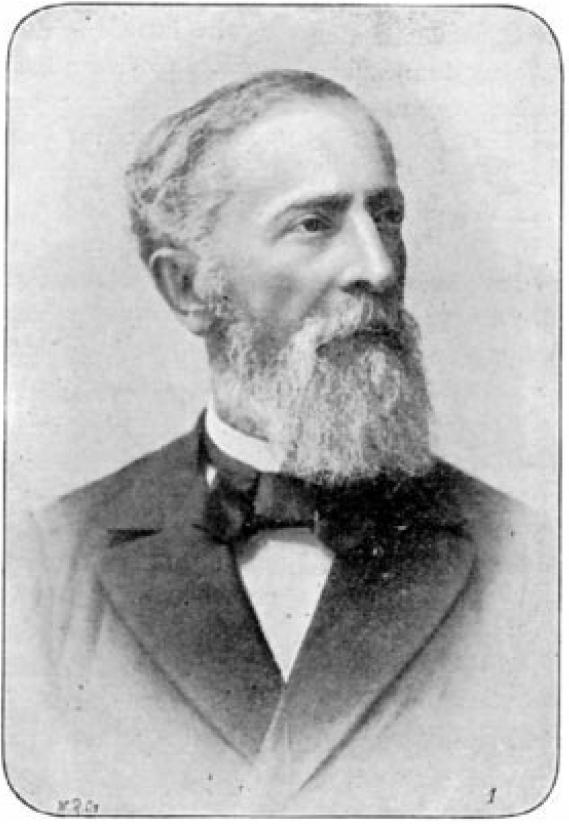
Timoleon Filimon from the Album of the 1896 Olympic Games in Athens

Timoleon Filimon (Greek: Τιμολέων Φιλήμων 1833 – 7 March 1898) was a Greek journalist, politician, intellectual and tutor of King George I. He was one of the founding members of the Historical and Ethnological Society of Greece.

== Biography ==
=== Studies and early career ===
He was born in 1833 in Nafplion, son of the publisher, writer and member of the Philiki Etaireia (Society of Friends) Ioannis Filimon. He studied law at the University of Athens. He studied law at the Athens University, from where he graduated with honours but he occupied himself since a teenager with journalism at the newspaper Aion, belonging to his father, and in 1856 he took over the newspaper's direction. In the following year he was imprisoned for three months after a condemnation for insulting King Otto I. Afterwards, he was the secretary of the three member committee (Kanaris-Zaimis-Grivas) which handed the crown to the new king George in Denmark. He consequently acted as secretary and tutor of king George till 1867.

=== Political career ===
In that same year he presented himself as parliamentary candidate for Attica, without succeeding to get elected. Success came for the first time in the election of 1868(In his first parliamentary term he also served as Vice President of Parliament). ). In the 1869 elections he failed to get elected, while in 1874, although he attracted large numbers of votes, his election was finally canceled. He was reelected in the elections of 1875 and 1879, while in the next ballots he did not manage to renew his presence in Parliament. He also occupied himself with local government, in parallel with his parliamentary career: In 1874 he was elected at the City Council of Athens for the first time, something which he repeated for another four consecutive terms. Furthermore, from 1878 till 1887 he served as president of the City Council. He was elected mayor of Athens in 1887 but he resigned in 1891, because of the acute financial problems of the municipality.

=== Culture ===
He served as the first curator of the Parliamentary Library from 1874 till 1887, during which term the library was significantly enriched (from a number of 5000 volumes contained in 1874, at the end of Philimon's term it reached about 120000 ), he was a founding member of the Historical and Ethnological Society of Greece and its first president for the period between 1882 – 1887, he served as secretary to the Musical and Dramatic Society and he contributed to the organization of the Olympic Games of 1896. Filimon also published a book titled The Mayor (Ο Δήμαρχος O Dimarhos) while his translation of the book The Ancient City by Numa Denis Fustel de Coulanges was published posthumously (edited by Spyridon Lambrou).

According to the official web page of the Greek Great Masonic Lodge, Timoleon Philimon was also a Grand Master of the lodge.

== Death ==
Filimon died of heart failure in Athens on 7 March 1898. His funeral was attended by the prime minister Alexandros Zaimis, by members of the Ministerial Council, by numerous politicians, by members of the royal family and by thousands of citizens.

== Sources ==
- Biography at the National Library Centre (in Greek)
- Konstantinos Skokos (1899) Imerologion Skokou En Athinais: Ek tou Typografeiou ton Katastimaton Anesti Konstantinidou (in Greek)
- Το Άστυ To Asty (15 November 1887) p 113 (in Greek)
- Ekaterini Dermitzaki (2013). Το Εθνικό Ιστορικό Μουσείο της Ιστορικής και Εθνολογικής Εταιρείας της Ελλάδος: ίδρυση, συλλεκτική πολιτική και άλλες δράσεις (1882–1926) (in Greek). Athens: National and Kapodistrian University of Athens.
