= Cîșla, Cantemir =

Cîșla
- Commune
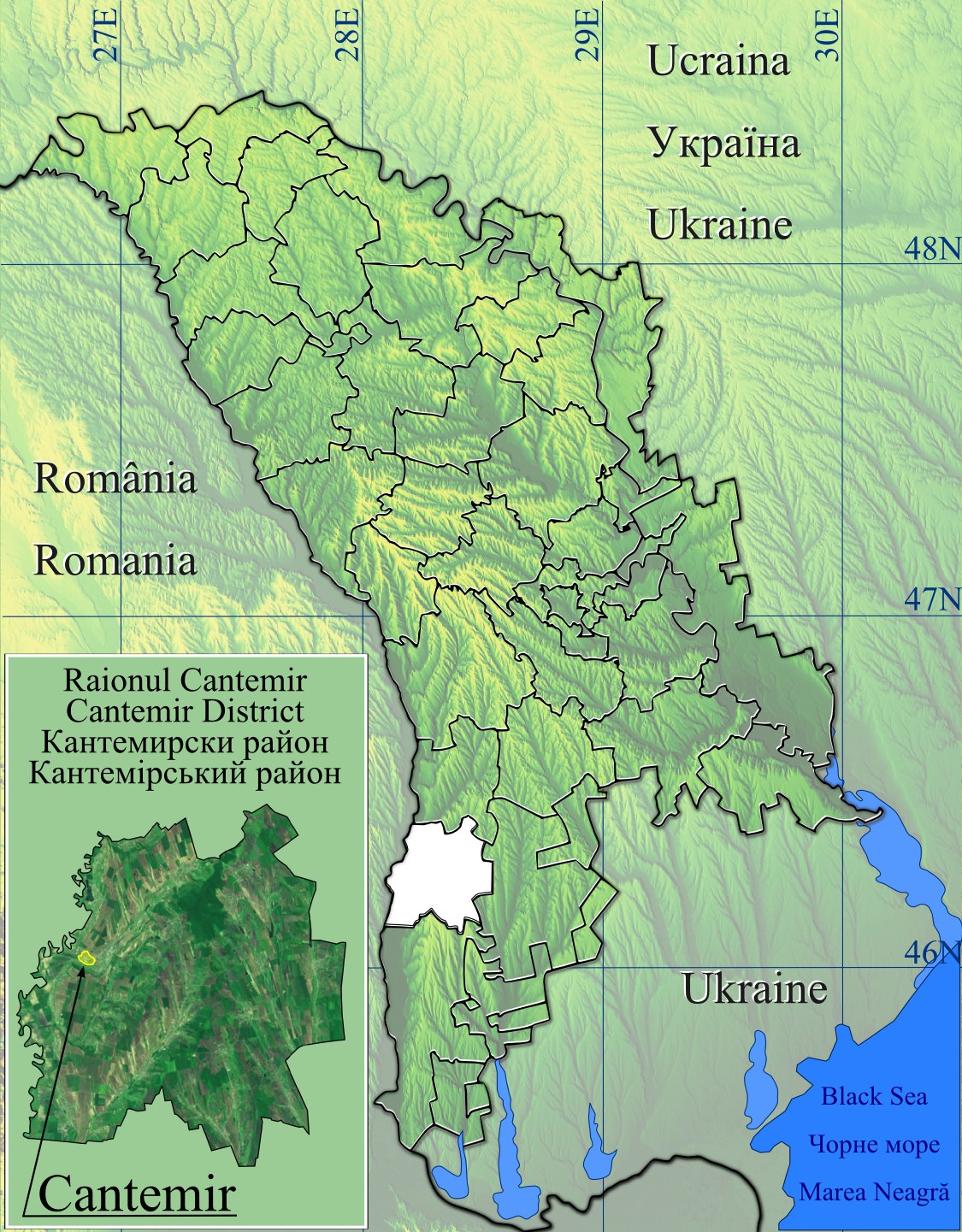
- Location within Cantemir
- Coordinates: 46°8′17″N 28°20′23″E
- Country: Moldova
- District: Cantemir District

Government
  - Mayor: Vîhodeț Natalia, PCRM
- Elevation: 164 m (538 ft)

Population (2014)
  - Total: 642
- Time zone: UTC+2 (EET)
  - Summer (DST): UTC+3 (EEST)
- Postal code: MD-7320

Cîșla is a commune in Cantemir District, Moldova. It is composed of two villages, Cîșla and Șofranovca.
