= Mîndrești =

- Commune
- Location within Moldova
- Coordinates: 47.5022222222°N 28.2780555556°E
- Country: Moldova
- District: Telenești District

Government
  - Mayor: Socolovschi Vasile

Population (2014)
  - Total: 4,217
- Time zone: UTC+2 (EET)
  - Summer (DST): UTC+3 (EEST)

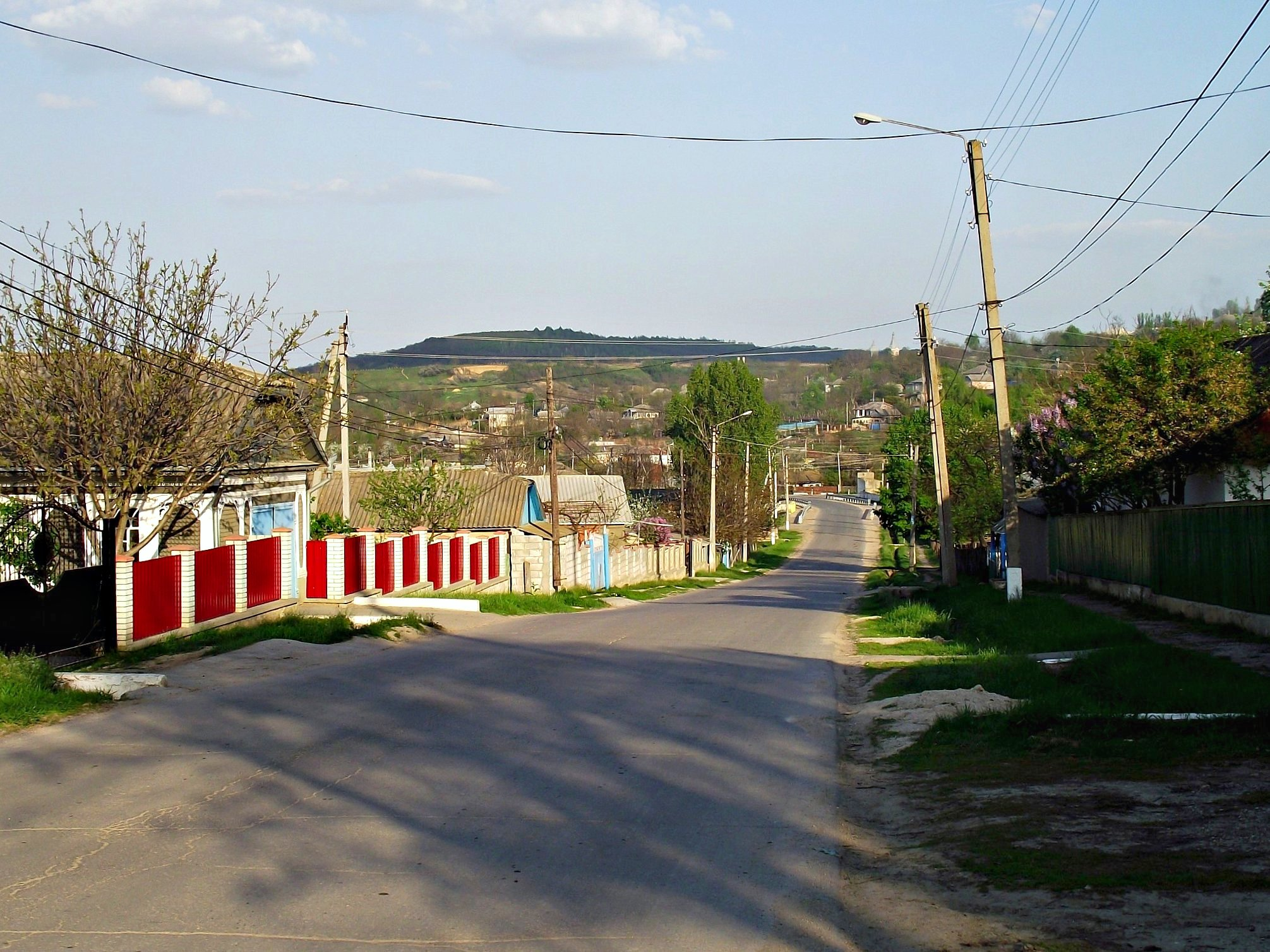

Mîndrești is a commune in Teleneşti District, Moldova. It is composed of two villages, Codru and Mîndrești.
