= Cîșla, Telenești =

Cîșla
- Village
- Location within Moldova
- Coordinates: 47.4941666667°N 28.2247222222°E
- Country: Moldova
- District: Telenești

Government
  - Mayor: Ion Borș (PDM)

Population (2014 census)
  - Total: 778
- Time zone: UTC+2 (EET)
  - Summer (DST): UTC+3 (EEST)

Cîșla is a village in Telenești District, Moldova.
