= Wolfgang Baldus =

German graphic designer and philatelist

- Born: 1954 (age 71–72)
- Occupations: Graphic designer and artist
- Known for: Philatelic writing
- Website: www.wolfgang-baldus.de

Wolfgang Baldus (born 1954) is a German graphic designer, artist, and philatelic writer. He is known for authoring and publishing books on cinderella stamps in the series History and Background Stories of Unusual Stamps and for his works on the philatelic forgeries and propaganda parodies produced by both sides during the First and Second World Wars.

== Early life and career ==
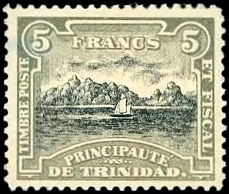
A stamp of the Principality of Trinidad, 1893, the subject of one of Baldus's books

Wolfgang Baldus was born in 1954. He works as a graphic designer and artist in Munich, Germany.

== Philatelic writing ==
Baldus's first book was the two-volume Schwarze Post (1998), which dealt with the forged and propaganda stamps produced during the wars of the twentieth century. It was later republished in an extended and revised edition as Postal Warfare: Espionage Forgeries and Propaganda Parodies of Postage Stamps, Postcards, and Letters. In 2002 he produced Philatelic Witnesses: Stamps of Revolutions, one of only two of his works that were not self-published.

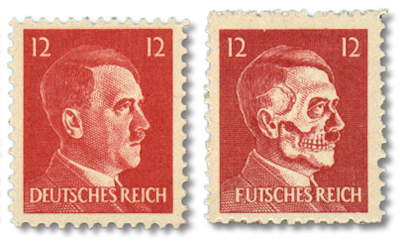
Genuine German 1941 Adolf Hitler 12pf stamp and American OSS skull parody stamp, "futsch" translates as "gone" or "broken" in English

In 2003 he published The Postage Stamps of the Principality of Trinidad, the first in his series titled History and Background Stories of Unusual Stamps, which had reached nine volumes by 2012. Baldus is known for his meticulous approach, in which he describes the background, production, and distribution of stamps produced by non-government entities, fraudsters, and fantasists, which are among the cinderella stamps of philately: often well known to collectors, but previously unresearched. The most recent book in the series is The Postage Stamps of the Principality of Atlantis (2012).

In 2005 he continued the subject of espionage forgeries and propaganda parody stamps that he had begun with Schwarze Post by publishing German Propaganda Parodies against Great Britain that covers the topic of forgeries and propaganda stamps produced by prisoners of the Nazi regime at Sachsenhausen concentration camp during the Second World War. Often the forged or parody stamps have been of so much interest to philatelists that they have themselves been forged to meet collector demand, and Baldus describes the different versions of the stamps, identifying the characteristics of the original forgeries or parodies and the later imitations.

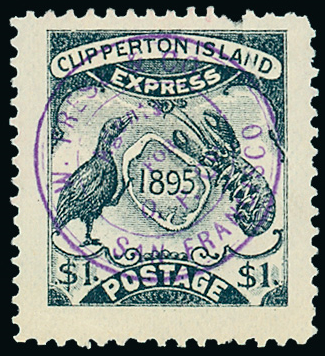
1895 $1 stamp of Clipperton Island

Also in 2005, he published OSS Hitler Stamps, A Philatelic Study on a Disputed Stamp Issue, a study of the stamps depicting Adolf Hitler that were produced by the United States Office of Strategic Services as part of Operation Cornflakes during the Second World War. This operation included the forging of genuine German stamps as well as the creation of parody stamps such as one based on a genuine German 12pf stamp of 1941 that was changed to superimpose a skull over Hitler's face and with the wording changed from Deutsches Reich (German Empire) to Futsches Reich (broken or lost empire); the Americans hoped to insert the stamps into the German mail system in order to undermine civilian morale.

In 2006, he published The Postage Stamps of Clipperton Island, a postal history of Clipperton Island in the Pacific, and a description of the local stamps issued in San Francisco in 1895 by the Oceanic Phosphate Company that had a guano business there from 1893 to 1897.

In 2006, Baldus was invited to sign the Maurice Williams Roll of Notable Cinderella Philatelists.

== Publications ==
The publications of Wolfgang Baldus, all published by the author in Munich unless otherwise noted, are:

=== History and Background Stories of Unusual Stamps series ===
- The Postage Stamps of the Principality of Trinidad (2003)
- The Postage Stamps of the Independent State of Acre (2003)
- The Postage Stamps of the Republic of Independent Guyana: Republic of Counani Amazonia Locals (2004)
- The Postage Stamps of the Kingdom of Sedang (2005)
- The Postage Stamps of Clipperton Island (2006)
- The Postage Stamps of the Pao Tzu Ku Bandit Post (2007)
- The Postage Stamps of Batèken (2009)
- The Classic Postage Stamps of Bokhara (2011)
- The Postage Stamps of the Principality of Atlantis (2012)

=== Others ===
- Schwarze Post. Two Volumes. (1998) (German language)
- Philatelic Witnesses: Stamps of Revolutions. Album Publishing. (2002) ISBN 9781885184092
- German Propaganda Parodies against Great Britain. Secret Stamp Production in the Sachsenhausen Concentration Camp. Great Britain & Commonwealth Philatelic Society, Berne. (2005) (2nd, 2006)
- OSS Hitler Stamps, A Philatelic Study on a Disputed Stamp Issue. (2005)
- British Propaganda Forgeries of World War I. (2008)
- Die Frank-Marke, Eine britische Propagandafälschung für das Generalgouvernement/The Frank Stamp, A British propaganda parody for the General Government. (2008) (With Michael Schweizer)
- Parole der Woche (2009)
- The President Who Lost His Face: A Philatelic Study on a Strange Postcard of Liberia. (2012)
- Die Himmlermarke/The Himmler Stamp. (2013)
- Postal Warfare: Espionage Forgeries and Propaganda Parodies of Postage Stamps, Postcards and Letters. (two volumes) (n.d.)
