= Spiegelberg criteria =

Diagnostic tool in gynocology

The Spiegelberg criteria are four criteria used to identify ovarian ectopic pregnancies named after Otto Spiegelberg.

== Description ==
Four criteria for differentiating ovarian from other ectopic pregnancies:

1. The gestational sac is located in the region of the ovary.
2. The ectopic pregnancy is attached to the uterus by the ovarian ligament.
3. Ovarian tissue in the wall of the gestational sac is proved histologically.
4. The tube on the involved side is intact.
