= Otto Spiegelberg =

German gynecologist (1830–1881)

Otto Spiegelberg (9 January 1830 – 9 August 1881) was a German gynecologist. He was born in Peine and died in Breslau.

He studied medicine at the University of Göttingen, afterwards furthering his education in Berlin, Prague and throughout the United Kingdom. In 1851 he earned his medical doctorate, and subsequently obtained his habilitation at Göttingen (1853). Later he was a professor of obstetrics at the Universities of Freiburg, Königsberg and Breslau.

Spiegelberg specialized in the fields of obstetrics and gynecological surgery, making contributions in diagnostics and surgical procedures involving ovariotomy. He is remembered for the eponymous "Spiegelberg criteria".

Spiegelberg published many medical treatises, including a popular textbook on obstetrics called "Lehrbuch der Geburtshülfe"; translated into English from its second edition as: Textbook of Midwifery (1887). In 1870, with Carl Siegmund Franz Credé (1819–1892), he founded the journal "Archiv für Gynäkologie".

== Spiegelberg's criteria ==
- Four criteria for differentiating ovarian from other ectopic pregnancies:
1. The gestational sac is located in the region of the ovary.
2. The ectopic pregnancy is attached to the uterus by the ovarian ligament.
3. Ovarian tissue in the wall of the gestational sac is proved histologically.
4. The tube on the involved side is intact.
